= William Turner =

William, Bill, or Billy Turner may refer to:

== Arts and entertainment ==
- William Turner (composer) (1651–1740), English baroque composer
- J. M. W. Turner (William Turner, 1775–1851), English Romantic landscape painter, watercolourist and printmaker
- William Turner (painter) (1789–1862), English watercolour painter
- William Greene Turner (1833–1917), American sculptor
- William H. Turner (actor) (1861–1942), Irish actor
- William Lakin Turner (1867–1936), English landscape artist
- William Ralph Turner (1920–2013), English painter
- William J. G. Turner (1952–1987), American composer and stage director

== Law and politics ==
- William Turner (London MP) (1615–1693), British member of parliament for City of London and lord mayor of London
- William Turner (Blackburn MP) (1777–1842), British member of parliament for Blackburn
- William F. Turner (1816–1899), judge in the Territory of Arizona
- William D. Turner (1836–1905), Wisconsin state assemblyman
- William Turner (Australian politician) (1837–1916), New South Wales politician
- William V. Turner (fl. 1871), American state representative in Alabama
- William George Turner (1872–1937), Irish Lord Mayor of Belfast
- William H. Turner (politician) (1931–2002), African-American school board member and state senator from Miami, Florida

== Religion ==
- William Turner (minister at Wakefield) (1714–1794), English dissenting divine
- William Turner (Unitarian minister) (1761–1859), English Unitarian minister
- William Turner (biographer) (1788–1853), English Unitarian minister
- William Turner (bishop of Salford) (1799–1872), English Roman Catholic bishop and vicar apostolic
- William Turner (bishop of Galloway) (1844–1914), Scottish Roman Catholic bishop
- William Turner (bishop of Buffalo) (1871–1936), Irish-American Roman Catholic bishop
- William Turner (priest) (1647–1685), English Anglican priest

== Science and medicine ==
- William Turner (naturalist) (c. 1508–1568), English ornithologist and botanist; dean of Wells Cathedral
- William Wadden Turner (1810–1859), British-born American linguist and librarian
- William Turner Thiselton-Dyer (1843–1928), British botanist
- William Aldren Turner (1864–1945), British neurologist
- W. E. S. Turner (William Ernest Stephen Turner, 1881–1963), English chemist and glass technologist

== Sports ==
=== Association football (soccer) ===
- Willie Turner (footballer) (c. 1866–?), Scottish international footballer
- William Turner (footballer, born 1867) (1867–?), Welsh international footballer
- Bill Turner (footballer, born 1894) (1894–1970), English footballer
- Bill Turner (English footballer, born 1901) (1901–1989), British footballer

=== Australian rules football ===
- Bill Turner (footballer, born 1870) (1870–1952), Australian rules footballer for St Kilda
- Bill Turner (Australian footballer, born 1901) (1901–1967), Australian rules footballer for Fitzroy
- Bill Turner (footballer, born 1912) (1912–1981), Australian rules footballer for Essendon

=== Other sports ===
- Aggie Turner (William Turner, 1893–1916), American baseball player
- Billy Turner (William H. Turner Jr., 1940–2021), American racehorse trainer
- Bill Turner (basketball) (1944–2023), American basketball player
- Willie Turner (sprinter) (born 1948), American sprinter
- Bill Turner (American football) (born 1960), American football player
- Billy Turner (American football) (born 1991), American football player

== Others ==
- William Turner (envoy) (1792–1867), British diplomat and author
- William Iredell Turner (1812–1881), Florida pioneer and soldier
- William Turner (anatomist) (1832–1916), Scottish academic
- William Thomas Turner (1856–1933), final captain of the RMS Lusitania
- Bill Turner (public servant) (1887–1959), Australian public servant; Comptroller-General of Customs
- William Irving Turner (1890–1950), American architect
- William B. Turner (1892–1918), U.S. Army officer and Medal of Honor recipient
- William Turner (1902/03–1921), 18-year-old lynching victim from Helena, Phillips County, Arkansas, see lynching of William Turner
- William Turner (British Army officer) (1907–1989)
- William W. Turner (1927–2015), American writer and former FBI agent

== In fiction ==
- Bootstrap Bill Turner, father of Will Turner in Disney's Pirates of the Caribbean films
- Will Turner, fictional character in Disney's Pirates of the Caribbean films
