= Samuel Bourn (disambiguation) =

Samuel Bourn (1714–1796) was an English Dissenter minister.

Samuel Bourn may also refer to:

- Samuel Bourn the Elder (1648–1719), English dissenting minister
- Samuel Bourn the Younger (1689–1754), English dissenting minister

== See also ==
- Samuel Bourne (1834–1912), British photographer
