= Thomas Dixon (nonconformist) =

English nonconformist minister and tutor

Thomas Dixon (1679/80 – 14 August 1729) was an English nonconformist minister and tutor.

== Early life and family ==
It was once thought that Thomas Dixon might have been the eponymous son of a nonconformist minister who was removed from the vicarage of Kelloe, County Durham in the Great Ejection of 1662. However, more recent studies consider this to be unlikely, although they do say that he was probably the son of an episcopalian. He was born at Ravenstonedale in the county of Westmorland around 1679/80.

He married Eleanor Stanger sometime after obtaining a bond to do so on 21 September 1708; she was the daughter of an elder of the Cockermouth Independent Church.

== Nonconformism ==
He studied at Manchester under John Chorlton and James Coningham, probably from 1700 to 1704, during which period he was for some time uncertain whether he should follow the path of nonconformism or that of the Church of England. He served briefly in the ministry at Colchester from 1704, but by October 1705 had succeeded Roger Anderton as minister of a dissenting congregation at Whitehaven that had been founded by Irish presbyterians.

Dixon was a disciple of Richard Baxter. During his time at Whitehaven, when he was considered the leading nonconformist of the then county of Cumberland, he established a dissenting academy that concentrated mainly on the education of future ministers. It was certainly in operation by 1710, the year after he and his probable advisor in the venture, Edmund Calamy, had travelled together to Scotland, where in April Dixon had been awarded an honorary MA degree. In 1712, the academy gained the services of his former tutor, Coningham, who had left the similar institution in Manchester, and thereafter it had the reputation of being the leading nonconformist academy in the north of England, although it is possible that there was a hiatus in its operations as a consequence of the 1714 Schism Act.

Dixon's status in the county enabled him to exert considerable influence in obtaining financial support for his students from the Presbyterian Fund Board. Among Dixon's academy pupils were John Taylor, George Benson the biblical critic, Caleb Rotheram of the Kendal Academy, and Henry Winder, author of the History of Knowledge.

In 1722 or 1723, Dixon moved to the presbyterian meeting house at Bank Street in Bolton, Lancashire. Some sources say that he did so as the successor to Samuel Bourn, but others note a two-year ministry of Peter Withington between those of Bourn and Dixon. He continued the operation of his academy, which moved with him to Bolton. He also practiced medicine in the town, having been awarded the medical degree of M.D. from King's College, Aberdeen in 1718.

Dixon died at his Bank Street manse on 14 August 1729, aged 50, and was buried in his meeting house. A memorial tablet placed there by one of his sons, Richard Dixon, described him as "facile medicorum et theologorum princeps" (easily chief among physicians and theologians).

== See also ==
- List of dissenting academies (1660–1800)
