= John Palmer (Unitarian, 1742–1786) =

English Unitarian minister

- Born: 1742; Norwich, England
- Died: 1786 (aged 43–44); Birmingham, England
- Occupation: Unitarian minister
- Children: 1

John Palmer (1742–1786) was an English Unitarian minister.

== Life ==
The son of John Palmer, wig-maker, he was born at Norwich. He was a protégé of John Taylor, who began his education, and, on becoming divinity tutor at Warrington Academy, placed Palmer (1756) at school in Congleton, Cheshire, under Edward Harwood. He entered Warrington Academy in 1759; Joseph Priestley was, from 1761, one of his tutors. In his last year he was constant supply (14 May 1763 to 15 August 1764) at Allostock, Cheshire.

In 1764 he became minister of King Edward Street Chapel, Macclesfield, and also kept a school there. There was an orthodox secession from his ministry; he consequently resigned in 1779, and moved to Birmingham without regular charge, being in independent circumstances. At Birmingham he renewed his acquaintance with Priestley, and was a member of a fortnightly clerical club which arranged the material for the Theological Repository. In 1782 Priestley recommended him, but without effect, as colleague to Joseph Bretland at Exeter.

Palmer died of paralysis at Birmingham on Tuesday, 26 December 1786, and was buried in the Old Meeting graveyard on 2 January 1787; Priestley preached (8 January) his funeral sermon. He married, first, at Macclesfield, Miss Heald; secondly, in 1777, the eldest daughter of Thomas White, dissenting minister at Derby, by whom he left one daughter.

== Works ==
He published:

- Free Remarks on a Sermon entitled "The Requisition of Subscription not inconsistent with Christian Liberty", 1772, anon.
- A Letter to Dr. Balguy. 1773, reply to the archidiaconal charge, 1772, by Thomas Balguy.
- A New System of Shorthand; being an Improvement upon … Byrom, 1774.
- An Examination of Thelyphthora, 1781. Against Martin Madan.

His contributions to the Theological Repository (1769–71) are signed "G.H."; contributions in later volumes (1784–6) are signed "Christophilos", "Symmachus", and "Erasmus". A letter from him is printed in Priestley's Harmony of the Evangelists (1780).
