= Franklin Baker (minister) =

British minister

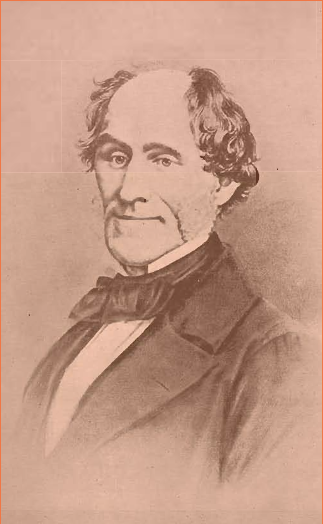
Franklin Baker (1800-1867)

Franklin Baker (27 August 1800 – 26 May 1867) was an English Unitarian minister.

He was born in Birmingham on 27 August 1800. He was the eldest son of Thomas Baker of that town. After the usual school education; and when unusually young for such a charge, he took the management of Baylis's school at Dudley. One of hie early friends and advisers was the Rev. John Kentish, of Birmingham; another was the Rev. James Hews Bransby, of Dudley, who directed his private studies by way of preparing him for the University of Glasgow, with the view of his ultimately becoming a Unitarian minister. By the aid of a grant from Dr. Daniel Williams's trustees he was enabled to go to Glasgow, where he spent three sessions and graduated M.A.

On the completion of his college course in 1823 he was invited to become minister of Bank Street Unitarian Chapel, Bolton, a charge which he accepted, though there had been dissensions there which made his work difficult. His connection with the chapel lasted for forty years, during which time the congregation became one of the most prosperous in the county, and the chapel was entirely rebuilt. In his earlier time, when the dissenters were battling for equal rights, he engaged in the political movements of the day, but his after-life was devoted to the work of his calling and the promotion of the charitable and educational institutions of the town. No one in that community was more heartily respected than Baker, and he received gratifying testimony of this in an offer from the Lord Lieutenant of the county to insert his name in the commission of the peace. He did not, however, consider it consistent with his position to accept it.

Besides occasional sermons and pamphlets on matters of passing interest, he was the author of various articles in the Penny Cyclopædia. He also published in 1854 a History of the Rise and Progress of Nonconformity in Bolton. This work is a valuable and accurate record, covering a period of 200 years. He resigned his ministerial position in 1864, and retired to Caton, on the banks of the River Lune, but at the end of three years he removed to Birmingham, where he could have the attention of a brother, who held a high medical position. He died on 26 May 1867.

== Family ==
Franklin Baker was the eldest son and third of ten children of Thomas Baker, headmaster of the Lancasterian School, Birmingham, and his wife, Charlotte Mould. Several of the children attained unusual distinction. In addition to Franklin Baker, they included Charles Baker, famous as an instructor of deaf people; Sir Thomas Baker (1810–1886), Unitarian minister at Sidmouth in 1833–4 and later a solicitor in Manchester where he was active in municipal affairs, mayor, and historian of the Unitarian congregation of Cross Street Chapel; Alfred Baker (1815–1893), an eminent Birmingham surgeon; and Harriet (1805–1850), who married Edward White Benson (1800–1843) and became mother of a second Edward White Benson (1829–1896), archbishop of Canterbury in 1882–96.

On 30 September 1835 Baker had married Mary Crook (1802–1879), daughter of Jeremiah Crook, a Liverpool merchant formerly of Bolton, another of whose daughters married Baker's brother Thomas; there were no children.
