= John Cameron (Reformed Presbyterian) =

John Cameron (1724–1799), born near Edinburgh, was a Scottish Presbyterian minister, active in Ulster.

== Life ==
Having served an apprenticeship to a bookseller in Edinburgh, he entered the university and took his M.A. degree. He belonged to the ‘reformed presbyterians’, or ‘covenanters’, and was admitted a probationer.

Going as a missionary to the north of Ireland around 1750, he travelled in various districts of Ulster as an outdoor preacher. His labours as a ‘mountain minister’ met with large acceptance. In 1754 there was a split in the Presbyterian congregation of Billy (otherwise Bushmills), County Antrim, some staying with their minister, John Logue, and some going off to form the new congregation of Dunluce. The Dunluce people offered to give a call to Cameron if he would leave the covenanters and join the regular Presbyterian body. He agreed, on 24 April 1755 the call was signed by 137 persons, and on 3 June Cameron was ordained by the presbytery of Route. An active pastor, he became noted as a writer of sermons, which were borrowed by his friends, episcopal and Presbyterian. Encountering John Taylor's Scripture Doctrine of Original Sin, he changed his theology. Going beyond Taylor, he adopted humanitarian views of the person of Christ.

Cameron also turned his attention to science. Being in want of a parish schoolmaster, he took into his house Robert Hamilton (1749–1830), the son of a neighbouring weaver, trained him, and introduced him to the study of anatomy. Hamilton afterwards became a physician and showed his gratitude to Cameron by dedicating to him The Duties of a Regimental Surgeon, 1794, 2 vols.

In 1768 Cameron was moderator of the Synod of Ulster. His year of office was marked by the renewed communication between the synod and the Antrim presbytery, excluded for non-subscription in 1726, and by the publication of Cameron's only acknowledged work, a prose epic.

In 1787–9 Cameron got a double portion of regium donum; his means were always very small. He died on 31 December 1799, and was buried in the parish churchyard of Dunluce, on the road between Portrush and the Giant's Causeway. An elegy on his grave was written by Rev. George Hill, formerly librarian of Queen's College, Belfast. Besides his son William, Cameron left a daughter, married to John Boyd of Dunluce.

== Works ==
He wrote anonymously several works (some in the form of dialogues) attacking from various points of view the principle of subscription to creeds. The authorship was no secret; but the extent of Cameron's doctrinal divergence from the standards of his church was not publicly revealed till nearly thirty years after his death. A paper rejecting the doctrine of the resurrection of the body was forwarded by Cameron to Archdeacon Francis Blackburne, in expectation of a reply. Blackburne sent the paper to Joseph Priestley, who published it in his Theological Repository, vol. ii. 1771, with the signature of "Philander" ("Philander", in later volumes, is one of the many signatures of Joseph Bretland). It led to a correspondence between Priestley and Cameron, and to the settlement of Cameron's son William, as a button-maker in Birmingham.

== Cameron's writings ==
- The Policy of Satan to destroy the Christian Religion, Glasgow 1774, anon.
- The Messiah; in nine books, Belfast, 1768; reprinted with memoir, Dublin, 1811.
- The Catholic Christian, Belfast, 1769, anon.
- The Catholic Christian defended, Belfast, 1771, (in reply to Benjamin McDowel, D.D., who attacked him by name. Cameron published his defence with the pseudonym of "Philalethes").
- Theophilus and Philander, Belfast, 1772, anonymous reply to McDowel's rejoinder.
- Forms of Devotion, Belfast, 1780.
- The Doctrines of Orthodoxy, Belfast, 1782, republished 1817 as The Skeleton covered with Flesh.
- The State of our First Parents.

Posthumous was

- The Doctrine of the Holy Scriptures, 1828 (edited by Arthur Nelson (d. 20 June 1831), presbyterian minister of Kilmore, County Cavan.
