= John Fransham =

John Fransham (1730–1810) was an English freethinker, eccentric, tutor and author.

== Early life ==
Fransham was the son of Thomas and Isidora Fransham, born early in 1730 (baptised 19 March) in the parish of St. George of Colegate, Norwich, where his father was sexton or parish clerk. A relative enabled him to begin to study for the church. After that he scraped a living; John Taylor gave him free instruction, and he took lessons from W. Hemingway, a land surveyor. He then wrote for Marshall, an attorney, but was never articled. one of Marshall's clerks, John Chambers, afterwards recorder of Norwich, took trouble over him. He made the acquaintance of Joseph Clover, the veterinary surgeon, who employed him to take horses to be shod, and taught him mathematics in return for Fransham's help in classics.

In 1748 he travelled north, but returned almost destitute. After this he worked with Daniel Wright, a freethinking journeyman weaver. The two sat facing each other, so that they could carry on discussions amid the rattle of their looms.

== Tutor ==
After Wright's death, around 1750, Fransham devoted himself to teaching. For two or three years he was tutor in the family of Leman, a farmer at Hellesdon, Norfolk. He next took pupils at Norwich in Latin, Greek, French, and mathematics. He only taught for two hours a day, and had time to act as amanuensis to Samuel Bourn (1714–1796). He became a member of a society for philosophical experiment, founded by Peter Bilby. His reputation grew as a successful preliminary tutor for the universities; he took on more pupils, and started to build a library.

In 1767 he spent nine months in London, carrying John Leedes, a former pupil, through his Latin examination at the College of Surgeons. In London he met Samuel Foote, who in his 'The Devil upon Two Sticks' (1768) caricatured teacher and pupil as Johnny Macpherson and Dr. Emanuel Last. On his return to Norwich, the Chute family, who had a country house at South Pickenham, allowed him (around 1771) to sleep at their Norwich house and to use the library. He taught (around 1772) in the family of Samuel Cooper, D.D., at Brooke Hall, Norfolk, on the terms of board and lodging from Saturday till Monday. This engagement he gave up, as the walk of over six miles out and in was too much for him.

The death of young Chute left Fransham living on potatoes. For nearly three years, from about 1780, he dined every Sunday with counsellor Cooper, a relative of the clergyman, who introduced him to Samuel Parr. From about 1784 to about 1794 he lodged with Thomas Robinson, schoolmaster at St. Peter's Hungate. He left Robinson to lodge with Jay, a baker in St. Clement's. In 1805 he was asked for assistance by a distant relative, Mrs. Smith; he took her as his housekeeper, hiring a room and a garret in St. George's Colegate. When she left him in 1806 he seems to have resided for about three years with his sister, who had become a widow; leaving her, he made his last move to a garret in Elm Hill.

In 1807 or 1808 he made the acquaintance of Michael Stark (d. 1831), a Norwich dyer, and became tutor to his sons, of whom the youngest was James Stark the artist. In January 1810 he took to his bed and was carefully nursed, but declined medical help. He died on 1 February 1810, and was buried on 4 February in the churchyard of St. George of Colegate.

== Works ==
Fransham was called a pagan and a polytheist chiefly on the strength of his hymns to the ancient gods. He annotated a copy of Thomas Chubb's posthumous works, apparently for republication as a vehicle of his own ideas. In his manuscript Metaphysicorum Elementa (begun 1748, and written with Spinoza as his model) he defines God as "ens non-dependens, quod etiam causa est omnium cæterorum existentium."

He published:

- "An Essay on the Oestrum or Enthusiasm of Orpheus", Norwich, 1760, (an anonymous tract on the happiness to be derived from a noble enthusiasm).
- "Two Anniversary Discourses: in the first of which the Old Man is exploded, in the second the New Man is recognised", London, 1768, (anonymous satires, reviewed in Monthly Review, 1769, xl. 83, and identified as Fransham's on the evidence of his manuscripts).
- "Robin Snap, British Patriotic Carrier", 1769–70, (a penny satirical print, published in Norwich; 26 numbers, the first on Saturday, 4 November 1769, then regularly on Tuesdays from 14 November 1769 to 30 January 1770, and again 13 February–24 April, also 15 May and 29 May 1770; all, with minor exceptions, written by Fransham; his own copy has a printed title-page,"'The Dispensation of Robin Snap", &c.; "snap" is the local term for the dragon carried about the streets of Norwich on the guild day.)

== Legacy ==
He left money to his sister; his books and manuscripts were left to Edward Rigby, and some of them passed into the possession of William Stark. William Saint, his pupil and biographer, obtained his mathematical books and manuscripts.

Fransham's manuscripts filled six quarto volumes. Five of these are described by Saint; they contain a few allegorical drawings. They bear the general title 'Memorabilia Classica: or a Philosophical Harvest of Ancient and Modern Institutions.' In the first volume is (No. 2) the original draft of his 'Oestrum,’ and (No. 5) 'The Code of Aristopia, or Scheme of a perfect Government,’ the best known of his writings. He advocates (p. 175) a decimal system of coinage and measures. The second volume, "A Synopsis of Classical Philosophy", embodies his 'Essay on the Fear of Death,’ expressing a hope of a future and more perfect state of being, a topic on which he had written in his nineteenth year. At the end of the third volume is his "Antiqua Religio", including his hymns to Jupiter, Minerva, Venus, Hercules, and others. The fourth volume includes the draft of his "Anniversary Discourses", and others in the same strain. The fifth volume contains thirty numbers of Robin Snap, some of which were worked up in the published periodical. A sixth volume, "Memorabilia Practica", contains a compendium of all the subjects which he taught.

Transcriptions of Fransham's hymns to pagan gods may be found online here. The hymns are believed to be the first explicitly neopagan text in English history.
