= Ralph Harrison =

Ralph Harrison (1748–1810) was an English nonconformist minister, composer and tutor.

== Life ==
The son of William Harrison, presbyterian minister of Chinley, Derbyshire, was born at Chinley on 10 September 1748. In 1763 he entered Warrington Academy, of which John Aikin was divinity tutor. In 1769 he was appointed assistant to Joseph Fownes (1715–1789) as minister of High Street Chapel, Shrewsbury.

On 29 December (elected 17 November) 1771 he succeeded Joseph Mottershead at Cross Street Chapel, Manchester. His theology was Arian. From 1774 he kept a school, and gained a reputation as a teacher, among his pupils being the sons of the Marquess of Waterford. From the institution of the Manchester Academy (22 February 1786) till 1789 Harrison was professor of classics and belles-lettres there. He died, after a long illness, on 10 November 1810.

== Works ==
Harrison published:

- ‘Institutes of English Grammar,’ &c., Manchester, 1777.
- ‘Sacred Harmony,’ &c. [1786], 4to, 2 vols. (contains psalm tunes of his composition).
- ‘A Sermon … at Manchester … on occasion of the Establishment of an Academy,’ &c., Warrington [1786].
- ‘Account of the Author,’ prefixed to John Seddon's posthumous ‘Discourses,’ Warrington, 1793.

Hymn tunes composed:

- Arlington
- Bankington
- Cambridge
- Peterborough
- Sterling
- Warrington

Posthumous was

- ‘Sermons,’ &c., 1813, (prefixed is ‘Biographical Memoir’ by his son William). Also some geographical manuals.

== Family ==
Soon after settling in Manchester, he married Ann, daughter of John Touchet. His son William (d. 30 Nov. 1859, aged 80) was minister at Blackley, Lancashire (1803–54); another son, John, (1786–1853), was a Manchester merchant and father of John Harrison, Ph.D. (d. 1866), minister at Chowbent, Lancashire (1838–47), Brixton, Surrey (1847–61), and Ipswich (1861–3).
