= John Seddon (disambiguation) =

John Seddon is a British psychologist.

John Seddon may also refer to:

- John Seddon (politician) (1934–2021), New Zealand politician and chief executive
- John Pollard Seddon (1827–1906), British architect
- John Seddon (Unitarian) (1719–1769), English Unitarian minister
- John Seddon of Warrington (1725–1770), English dissenting minister, rector of Warrington Academy
