= William Blackmore =

William Blackmore may refer to:

- William Blackmore (minister) (1616–1684), ejected minister
- William Henry Blackmore (1827–1878), English lawyer who gained a fortune by exploiting a large social network as an investment promoter
