= 1866 Manchester City Council election =

Local election in Manchester

- 1 November 1866

16 of 64 seats to Manchester City Council 33 seats needed for a majority

Elections to Manchester City Council were held on Thursday, 1 November 1866. One third of the councillors seats were up for election, with each successful candidate to serve a three-year term of office.

== Ward results ==
=== All Saints' ===
All Saints'
Party	Candidate	Votes	%	±%
Conservative	Thomas Clowes*	uncontested		
Conservative hold		Swing		

=== Ardwick ===
Ardwick
Party	Candidate	Votes	%	±%
Conservative	Richard Hope*	uncontested		
Conservative hold		Swing		

=== Cheetham ===
Cheetham
Party	Candidate	Votes	%	±%
Liberal	John James Harwood	659	55.5	N/A
	Samuel Broadbent Ingham*	528	44.5	N/A
Majority		131	11.0	N/A
Turnout		1,187		
Liberal gain from		Swing		

=== Collegiate Church ===
Collegiate Church
Party	Candidate	Votes	%	±%
Liberal	Thomas Worthington*	uncontested		
Liberal hold		Swing		

=== Exchange ===
Exchange
Party	Candidate	Votes	%	±%
Liberal	Thomas Warburton*	uncontested		
Liberal hold		Swing		

=== Medlock Street ===
Medlock Street
Party	Candidate	Votes	%	±%
Conservative	James Craven*	uncontested		
Conservative hold		Swing		

=== New Cross ===
New Cross
Party	Candidate	Votes	%	±%
Liberal	Edwin Butterworth*	uncontested		
Conservative	Adam Woodward*	uncontested		
Liberal hold		Swing		
Conservative hold		Swing		

=== Oxford ===
Oxford
Party	Candidate	Votes	%	±%
Liberal	Henry Patteson*	uncontested		
Liberal hold		Swing		

=== St. Ann's ===
St. Ann's
Party	Candidate	Votes	%	±%
Liberal	Thomas Baker*	uncontested		
Liberal hold		Swing		

=== St. Clement's ===
St. Clement's
Party	Candidate	Votes	%	±%
Liberal	Alfred Whitworth*	uncontested		
Liberal hold		Swing		

=== St. George's ===
St. George's
Party	Candidate	Votes	%	±%
Liberal	Thomas Schofield	uncontested		
Liberal hold		Swing		

=== St. James' ===
St. James'
Party	Candidate	Votes	%	±%
Conservative	John Waterhouse	194	77.3	N/A
	John Worthy Williams	57	22.7	N/A
Majority		137	54.6	N/A
Turnout		251		
Conservative gain from		Swing		

=== St. John's ===
St. John's
Party	Candidate	Votes	%	±%
Conservative	William Livesley*	uncontested		
Conservative hold		Swing		

=== St. Luke's ===
St. Luke's
Party	Candidate	Votes	%	±%
Conservative	William Birch*	uncontested		
Conservative hold		Swing		

=== St. Michael's ===
St. Michael's
Party	Candidate	Votes	%	±%
Conservative	Gregory Allcock*	281	52.8	N/A
Liberal	Hugh Warburton	251	47.2	N/A
Majority		30	5.6	N/A
Turnout		532		
Conservative hold		Swing		
