= Richard Goodwin =

Richard Goodwin may refer to:

- Richard Goodwin (artist) (born 1953), Australian artist, architect, and professor
- Richard Goodwin (minister) (died 1685), British minister
- Richard Goodwin (sportsman), Australian-Filipino cricketer, Rugby League player and Rugby Sevens player
- Richard Goodwin (producer) (born 1934), British film producer
- Richard Elton Goodwin (1908–1986), British general
- Richard H. Goodwin (1910–2007), American botanist and conservationist
- Richard M. Goodwin (1913–1996), American mathematician and economist
- Richard N. Goodwin (1931–2018), American writer and advisor to US Presidents Kennedy and Johnson

== See also ==
- Richard Godwin (1922–2005), American nuclear engineer and Reagan Administration under secretary
- Richard Godwyn (died 1601), English MP
