= 1863 Manchester City Council election =

Local election in Manchester

- 2 November 1863

16 of 64 seats to Manchester City Council 33 seats needed for a majority

Elections to Manchester City Council were held on Monday, 2 November 1863. One third of the councillors seats were up for election, with each successful candidate to serve a three-year term of office.

== Ward results ==
=== All Saints' ===
All Saints'
Party	Candidate	Votes	%	±%
Conservative	Thomas Clowes*	324	60.2	N/A
Liberal	John Begg McKerrow	214	39.8	N/A
Majority		110	20.4	N/A
Turnout		538		
Conservative hold		Swing		

=== Ardwick ===
Ardwick
Party	Candidate	Votes	%	±%
Liberal	Robert Rumney*	uncontested		
Liberal hold		Swing		

=== Cheetham ===
Cheetham
Party	Candidate	Votes	%	±%
	Samuel Broadbent Ingham*	uncontested		
		Swing		

=== Collegiate Church ===
Collegiate Church
Party	Candidate	Votes	%	±%
Liberal	Thomas Worthington	489	61.0	+19.1
Liberal	William Jones Williams	312	39.0	−2.9
Majority		177	22.0	+5.8
Turnout		801		
Liberal hold		Swing		

=== Exchange ===
Exchange
Party	Candidate	Votes	%	±%
Liberal	Thomas Warburton*	uncontested		
Liberal hold		Swing		

=== Medlock Street ===
Medlock Street
Party	Candidate	Votes	%	±%
Conservative	James Craven	1,211	52.2	−6.6
Liberal	John Heywood	1,107	47.8	+6.6
Majority		104	4.4	−13.2
Turnout		2,318		
Conservative gain from		Swing		

=== New Cross ===
New Cross
Party	Candidate	Votes	%	±%
Liberal	Edwin Butterworth*	uncontested		
Conservative	Adam Woodward*	uncontested		
Liberal hold		Swing		
Conservative hold		Swing		

=== Oxford ===
Oxford
Party	Candidate	Votes	%	±%
Liberal	Henry Patteson*	uncontested		
Liberal hold		Swing		

=== St. Ann's ===
St. Ann's
Party	Candidate	Votes	%	±%
Liberal	Thomas Baker*	uncontested		
Liberal hold		Swing		

=== St. Clement's ===
St. Clement's
Party	Candidate	Votes	%	±%
Liberal	Robert George Stracey*	uncontested		
Liberal hold		Swing		

=== St. George's ===
St. George's
Party	Candidate	Votes	%	±%
Liberal	Richard Aspden*	294	93.3	N/A
	John Whitehead	20	6.3	N/A
	John Heap	1	0.4	N/A
Majority		274	87.0	N/A
Turnout		315		
Liberal hold		Swing		

=== St. James' ===
St. James'
Party	Candidate	Votes	%	±%
	Charles Sever*	uncontested		
		Swing		

=== St. John's ===
St. John's
Party	Candidate	Votes	%	±%
	Joseph Marsden*	uncontested		
		Swing		

=== St. Luke's ===
St. Luke's
Party	Candidate	Votes	%	±%
Conservative	Thomas Lewis Williams	352	52.9	N/A
Liberal	Thomas Greenhalgh*	313	47.1	N/A
Majority		39	5.8	N/A
Turnout		665		
Conservative gain from Liberal		Swing		

=== St. Michael's ===
St. Michael's
Party	Candidate	Votes	%	±%
Conservative	Gregory Allcock*	uncontested		
	Joseph Richardson	no votes		
	Francis Twemlow	no votes		
Conservative hold		Swing		
