= Samuel Bourn =

English dissenting minister (1714–1796)

Samuel Bourn (1714–1796) was an English Dissenter minister.

Bourn was the third Samuel Bourn and a second son of Samuel Bourn the Younger, and his wife, Hannah Harrison, a widow, née Hannah Taylor of Kendal. His grandfather was Samuel Bourn the elder.

He was educated at Stand Grammar School, Lancashire, and the University of Glasgow. In 1742 he became dissenting minister of Rivington, Lancashire, where he enjoyed the friendship of Hugh Willoughby, 15th Baron Willoughby of Parham. In 1754 Bourn moved to Norwich to assist the Presbyterian minister John Taylor, who three years later left for Warrington Academy.

== Life ==
He was born at Crook near Kendal, and educated at Stand Grammar School and the University of Glasgow where he studied under Francis Hutcheson and John Simson. In 1742 he settled in the ministry at Rivington, Lancashire, where he enjoyed the friendship of Hugh, 15th Lord Willoughby of Parham, who lived at Shaw Place, near Rivington, and was the representative of the last of the Presbyterian noble families. He was a fundamental scripturalist, a Bible Protestant, who relied solely on the witness of the New Testament in matter of doctrine and ethics.

Bourn was not ordained till some years after his settlement. He then made a lengthy declaration (printed by Joshua Toulmin) dealing with the duties of the ministry and allowing no doctrine or duty except those taught in the New Testament. Bourn lived partly at Leicester Mills, a wooded vale near Rivington, and partly at Bolton. In 1752 the publication of his first sermon under the title The Rise, Progress, Corruption and Declension of the Christian Religion, led to overtures from the Presbyterian congregation at Norwich, and in 1754, apparently after the death of the senior minister, Peter Finch, Bourn became the colleague of John Taylor. The Norwich Presbyterians had laid the first stone of a new meeting-house on 25 February 1754. When Bourn came to them they were worshipping in St Mary the Less, Norwich, an ancient edifice, then held by trustees for the Walloon or Huguenot Protestants. On 12 May 1756 was opened the new building, the Octagon Chapel, Norwich. Not long after Bourn lost £1,000, which he had risked in his brother Daniel Bourn's cotton mill venture. Among those brought up under his ministry was Sir James Edward Smith, founder of the Linnean Society.

When in 1757 Taylor left Norwich to fill the divinity chair at Warrington Academy, Bourn obtained as colleagues first John Hoyle, and afterwards Robert Alderson, subsequently a lawyer, and father of Edward Hall Alderson. When Bourn became incapable of work, Alderson had to discharge the whole duty, and was accordingly ordained on 13 September 1775.

== Sermons and debates ==
During 1758, Bourn went from place to place searching for subscriptions to his two books of sermons. He entrusted his manuscripts to Samuel Chandler of Old Jewry. In 1758 Bourn travelled around to obtain subscriptions for two volumes of sermons. He placed the manuscript in the hands of Chandler. In one of these sermons Bourn had espoused the doctrine of the annihilation of the wicked, but in London in 1759 he heard Chandler characterise in a sermon the annihilation doctrine as "utterly inconsistent with the Christian scheme". Deeming this a personal attack, he tried to draw Chandler into a controversy by a published letter. Like his father, Bourn rested in the Christology of Samuel Clarke. He was no optimist; he devoted a powerful discourse to the theme that no great improvement in the moral state of mankind is practicable by any means whatsoever (vol. i. 1760, No. 14).

Unfortunately for Bourn he had found in Chandler an implacable deist who denounced Bourn's conviction in 'annihilation of the wicked' which was Chandler's interpretation of the Doctrine of Original Sin. Bourn took this attack personally. In 1759 he published a self-justificatory letter rejecting Chandler's abusive charge. John Mason joined the debate conducted by published sermons in a two volume work called Christian Morals. He also engaged in debate with John Mason (1706–1763) over the resurrection of the flesh. Bourn's opposite view is defended in an appendix to his sermons on the Parables.

Bourn published in 1764 a rejoinder encapsulated Presbyterian doctrine appended to an earlier work known as Discourses on the Parables of our Saviour. During his career Bourn moved to a more Arian christology in the philosophical mould of Samuel Clarke, rejecting the trinity doctrine and justification by faith, rationalising Christ's deification as the Son of Man. A traditionally heretical position, he was pessimistic about Man's essentially fallen nature. His sermons were often characterized as solemn, and morose, sombre. In 1760 he published A series of discourses on the principles and evidence of natural religion and the Christian revelation.

Bourn was a favourite with the local Anglican clergy; but he retired to Thorpe on a very modest income of £60. Samuel Parr, headmaster of Norwich grammar school took him to Cambridge, and spoke of him as a masterly writer, a profound thinker, and an intimate friend. When his health failed, and he was retiring on a property of £60 a year, Isaac Mann, Bishop of Cork, who was visiting Norwich offered him a sinecure preferment of £300 a year if he chose to conform; Bourn declined. He was unable to finish his monumental History of the Hebrews. His last collection of sermons published in 1777 were comprising Fifty Sermons on Various Subjects, Critical, Philosophical and Moral.

Bourn died at Norwich on 24 September 1796, and was buried on 27 September in the graveyard of the Octagon Chapel. Late in life he married, but left no family.
