= Theological Repository =

Periodical

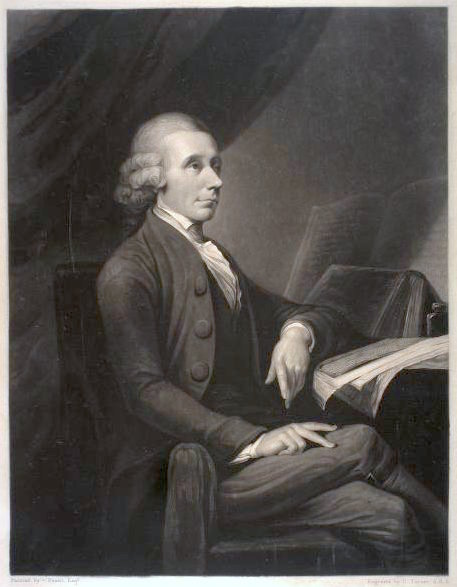
Engraving by Charles A. E. Turner (1836) of a Priestley portrait commissioned by Joseph Johnson from Henry Fuseli (c. 1783).

The Theological Repository was a periodical founded and edited from 1769 to 1771 by the eighteenth-century British polymath Joseph Priestley. Although ostensibly committed to the open and rational inquiry of theological questions, the journal became a mouthpiece for Dissenting, particularly Unitarian and Arian, doctrines.

Priestley promised to print all viewpoints, but only like-minded authors ever submitted articles. He was therefore forced to provide much of the journal's content himself. After only a few years, due to a lack of funds, he was forced to cease publishing the journal. About a decade later, in 1784, Priestley revived the Theological Repository, but he again became responsible for much of the journal's content and again the journal became insolvent after several issues (1784, 1786, 1788).

Joseph Johnson, Priestley's close friend and publisher, was responsible for issuing the journal. Dedicated to the Unitarian cause, he bore much of the financial burden of the enterprise.

== Contributors ==
Those contributing to the Repository included:

- Samuel Badcock
- Samuel Bourn the Younger (posthumous publication of correspondence with Philip Doddridge)
- John Brekell, writing as Verus
- Joseph Bretland, writing as Philander and under other names in the second series.
- John Cameron, writing as Philander in the first series.
- Paul Cardale
- James Duchal
- William Hazlitt, father of the essayist, writing as Philalethes and Rationalis
- Joseph Mottershead, writing as Theophilus
- John Palmer, who wrote in the first series as G.H., but in the second series as Christophilos, Symmachus, and Erasmus.
- Thomas Fyshe Palmer, writing as Anglo-Scotus
- William Turner, writing as Vigilius
- John Wiche, writing as Nazaraeus

== Bibliography ==
- Braithwaite, Helen. Romanticism, Publishing and Dissent: Joseph Johnson and the Cause of Liberty. Palgrave Macmillan, 2003. ISBN 0-333-98394-7.
- Holt, Anne. A Life of Joseph Priestley. London: Oxford University Press, 1931.
- Schofield, Robert E. The Enlightenment of Joseph Priestley: A Study of his Life and Work from 1733 to 1773. University Park: Pennsylvania State University Press, 1997. ISBN 0-271-01662-0.
- Schofield, Robert E. The Enlightened Joseph Priestley: A Study of His Life and Work from 1773 to 1804. University Park: Pennsylvania State University Press, 2004. ISBN 0-271-02459-3.
- Uglow, Jenny. The Lunar Men: Five Friends Whose Curiosity Changed the World. New York: Farrar, Straus and Giroux, 2002. ISBN 0-374-19440-8.
