= Charles Clement Coe =

English Unitarian minister and writer

- Born: 8 February 1830; King's Lynn
- Died: 1 April 1921 (aged 91); Bournemouth
- Occupation: Unitarian minister

Charles Clement Coe (8 February 1830 – 1 April 1921) was an English Unitarian minister and writer who advocated non-Darwinian evolution.

Coe was born in King's Lynn and was educated at Manchester College, Oxford. He was President of the Leicester Literary and Philosophical Society (1862-1863) and was Minister of the Unitarian Great Meeting chapel in Bond Street, Leicester. His was minister at Bank Street Unitarian Chapel in Bolton, Lancashire, from 1874 to 1895, when he moved to Bournemouth.

It was while at Bolton that Coe wrote a large volume, Nature Versus Natural Selection: An Essay on Organic Evolution (1895). He defended evolution but rejected natural selection. The biologist J. Arthur Thomson gave the book a positive review, commenting that it is a very interesting critique of natural selection written with much skill. It was also positively reviewed in The Lancet journal.

Coe was an early writer to use the term neo-Darwinism in 1889.

== Publications ==
- Outlines of a Christian Faith (1862)
- The Law of Parsimony and the Argument of Design (1882)
- General Gordon in a New Light: The Cause of War, and the Advocate of Peace (1885)
- Darwinism and Neo-Darwinism (1889)
- Nature Versus Natural Selection: An Essay on Organic Evolution (1895)
