= Philip Holland =

Philip Holland may refer to:

- Philip Holland (politician)
- Philip Holland (minister)
