= Roger Flexman =

English Presbyterian minister

Roger Flexman (1708–1795) was an English Non-Subscribing Presbyterian (Unitarian) minister, known also as a chronological and historical scholar, and published as an indexer and bibliographer.

== Life ==
He was born on 22 February 1708 at Great Torrington, Devon, where his father was a manufacturer. He showed early promise, and at the age of fifteen (1723) was admitted to the academy of John Moore, presbyterian minister at Tiverton, Devon, to study for the ministry. He declined an offer from Moore of the post of tutor in the academy, and applied to the Exeter assembly on 7 May 1728 to admit him to examination for license. His application was granted, in spite of his youth, after examination by the Calvinist John Ball. He was licensed at Tiverton in the course of the summer. According to the records of the Exeter assembly he began his ministry at Great Torrington. He was ordained at Modbury, Devon, on 15 July 1730. In 1731 he became minister at Bow, near Crediton, Devonshire, and appears to have assisted Josiah Eveleigh, the presbyterian minister at Crediton. In 1735 he moved to Chard, Somerset, and in 1739 to Bradford, Wiltshire.

He came to London in 1747, having accepted a call to the presbyterian congregation in Jamaica Row, Rotherhithe. In 1754 he was chosen one of the preachers of the Friday morning lecture, founded in 1726 at Little St. Helen's, Bishopsgate, by William Coward (died 1738). Flexman for some time a minister at Rotherhithe. In 1770 he received the degree of D.D. from Marischal College, Aberdeen.

Preferment was offered him in the established church. Owing partly to the failure of his health, partly, perhaps, to his adoption of Arian views, his congregation declined, and on his resignation in 1783 became extinct. He retained his lectureship into old age. Heterodox in theology, Flexman was conservative in his religious philosophy, and in later life opposed materialists and necessarians. He was a trustee of Dr. Daniel Williams's foundations from 1778 to 1786, and librarian from 1786 to 1792.

During his last years Flexman was in bad physical and mental health. He died on 14 June 1795, at the house of his daughter in Prescot Street, Goodman's Fields. His funeral sermon was preached by Abraham Rees of the Cyclopædia. He married (1747) a daughter of a member of his congregation at Bradford, named Yerbury.

== Works ==
Flexman was noted for a minute knowledge of the constitutional history of England. His reputation introduced him to some of the leading politicians of his day, and, having already shown skill as an index-maker, he was appointed (1770) one of the compilers of the general index to the journals of the House of Commons of Great Britain. His plan was adopted by a committee of the house, and the period 1660–97 was assigned to him. He completed his work in four folio volumes (viii–xi.) in 1780.

Samuel Johnson grumbled that in indexing The Rambler Flexman had included John Milton simply as "Milton, Mr. John." Flexman compiled a bibliography appended to his edition of Gilbert Burnet's Own Time, 1753–4, 4 vols.; a memoir and bibliography prefixed to the Twenty Sermons, 1755, of Samuel Bourn the younger; and bibliographies annexed to the funeral sermons for Samuel Chandler, 1766, and Thomas Amory, 1774.

In Psalms and Hymns for Divine Worship, 1760, edited by Michael Pope, presbyterian minister of Leather Lane, are four compositions, signed ‘F.,’ and contributed by Flexman. One of them appears, with improvements, in Andrew Kippis's Collection, 1795, and in later collections.

Besides the above he published:

- The Connexion and Harmony of Religion and Virtue, 1752, (charity sermon).
- Critical, Historical, and Political Miscellanies, 1752; 1762.
- The Plan of Divine Worship in the Churches of Protestant Dissenters, 1754, (against forms of prayer).
- The Nature and Advantage of a Religious Education, 1770, (sermon).

Also the funeral sermon for Thomas Amory, 1774.
