= Thomas Baker (Unitarian) =

English Unitarian minister (1810–1886)

Sir Thomas Baker (16 May 1810 – 17 April 1886) was a Unitarian minister and Mayor of Manchester, England.

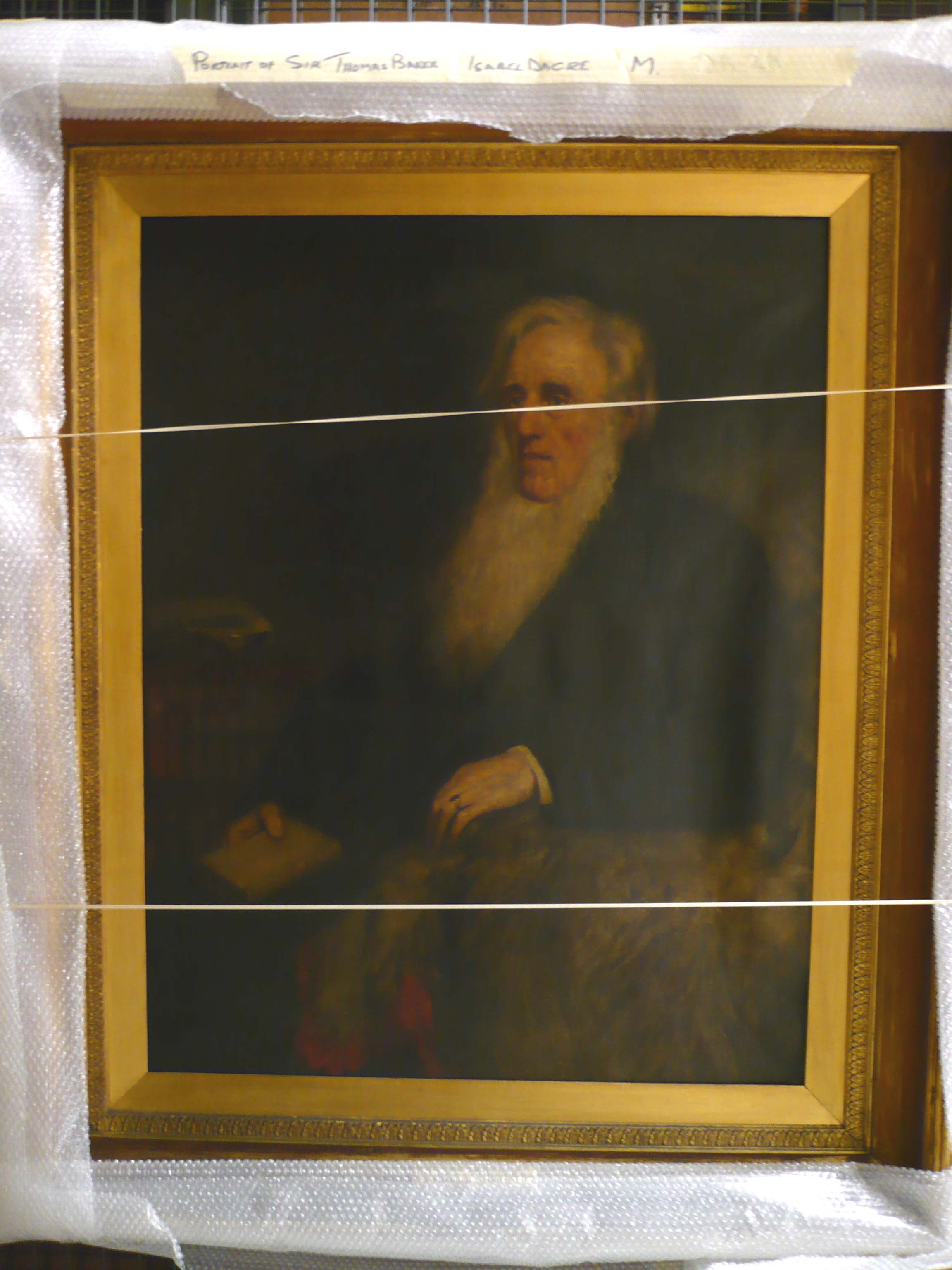
Painting of Baker

== Biography ==
Baker was born in Birmingham on 16 May 1810 and attended King Edward's School, Birmingham. He studied divinity at Manchester College, York between 1827–32.

During his career, he was a minister in Sidmouth, Devon, for a year and then moved to Manchester. He continued his ministry until 1840, when he became a solicitor.

In Manchester, Baker attended Cross Street Unitarian Chapel, of which he was a trustee for 20 years. He wrote a somewhat unreliable, eccentric book titled Memorials of a Dissenting Chapel (1884). The Unitarian and religious historian Alexander Gordon said that Baker was "an uncommonly good hater" and refused to be involved with the project but, according to Herbert McLachlan, the book has been widely used and contains "much of value" despite its deficiencies.

Baker, who lived at Skerton House in Old Trafford, was Mayor of Manchester between 1880–82. He was knighted in 1883 and died on 17 April 1886.

Baker's brother, Franklin, was for many years the minister at Bank Street Unitarian Chapel in Bolton. Another brother was Charles, who was a pioneer of education for the deaf and about whom Thomas published a memoir.
