= Henry Winder =

English chronologist

Henry Winder (15 May 1693 – 9 August 1752) was an English nonconformist minister and chronologist.

== Life ==
The son of Henry Winder (d. 1733), farmer, by a daughter of Adam Bird of Penruddock, he was born at Hutton John, parish of Greystoke, Cumberland, on 15 May 1693. His grandfather, Henry Winder, a farmer, who lived to be over a hundred (he was living in 1714), was falsely charged with murdering his first-born son. Henry Winder, the grandson, after passing through the Penruddock grammar school under John Atkinson, entered (1708) the Whitehaven Academy under Thomas Dixon, where Caleb Rotheram and John Taylor were among his fellow students. For two years (1712–14) he studied at Dublin under Joseph Boyse In Dublin he was licensed to preach.

In 1714 Winder succeeded Edward Rothwell as minister of the independent congregation at Tunley, Lancashire, and was ordained at St. Helen's on 11 September 1716, Christopher Bassnett preaching on the occasion. In 1718 (his first sacrament was 16 November) he was appointed minister of Castle Hey congregation, Liverpool. The first entry in the extant minutes of the Warrington classis (22 April 1719) records his admission to that body, ‘upon his making an acknowledgment of his breaking in upon the rules of it, in the way & manner of his coming to Liverpoole.’ A strong advocate of non-subscription in the controversy then active both in England and in Ireland, he brought round his congregation to that view. His ministry was successful; a new chapel was built for him in Benn's Garden, Red Cross Street, and opened in July 1727. From 1732 he corresponded with the London dissenters, with a view to the repeal of the Test and Corporation Acts.

Winder married the widow of William Shawe of Liverpool, and educated her son William Shawe, afterwards of Preston. On taking him in 1740 to study at Glasgow, he received the diploma of D.D.

In September 1746 Winder suffered a stroke of paralysis, and never again entered the pulpit, though he preached twice from the reading-desk in January 1747, and occasionally assisted at the sacrament in that year. John Henderson (d. 4 July 1779), who took Anglican orders in 1763, and was the first incumbent of St. Paul's, Liverpool, became his assistant and successor. Winder's faculties failed, and he died on Sunday 9 August 1752. He was buried on the south side of the churchyard of St. Peter's, Liverpool (now the cathedral); the memorial stone was earthed over when the churchyard was laid out as a garden. Henderson preached his funeral sermon. Winder outlived his wife, and left no issue.

His library (a remarkable one, with a valuable collection of tracts) and manuscripts were bequeathed to his congregation. The library was transferred to Renshaw Street Unitarian Chapel, to which the congregation moved in 1811. A letter (now lost) giving an account (6 August 1723) of the non-subscription debates in the Belfast sub-synod, which Winder had attended as a visitor, was printed in the Christian Moderator, October 1827 (p. 274), from a copy by John Scott Porter, then minister at Toxteth Park chapel, Liverpool.

== Works ==
For young Shawe's use, Winder drew up (about 1733), but did not publish, ‘a short general system of chronology’ on ‘the Newtonian plan.’ This was the germ of his bulky work, the result of twelve years' labour, A Critical and Chronological History of the Rise, Progress, Declension, and Revival of Knowledge, chiefly Religious. In two Periods. I. … Tradition, from Adam to Moses. II. … Letters, from Moses to Christ, 1745, 2 vols. (dedication to William Shawe). He prefers Moses to all secular historians, as earlier and more authentic. In vol. ii. chap. xxi. § 3, is a eulogy of British liberties, with evident reference to the events of 1745, during which Winder had helped to raise a regiment for the defence of Liverpool. The work did not sell, and was reissued as a second edition in 1756, with new title-page, and Memoirs of the author by George Benson.

=== Attributions ===
This article incorporates text from a publication now in the public domain: Lee, Sidney, ed. (1900). "Winder, Henry". Dictionary of National Biography. Vol. 62. London: Smith, Elder & Co.
