= James Duchal =

Irish Presbyterian divine

James Duchal, D.D. (1697–1761) was an Irish Presbyterian divine.

== Life ==
Duchal is said to have been born in 1697 at Antrim. The year is probably correct, but the place is mistaken; his baptism is not recorded in the presbyterian register of Antrim. In the Glasgow matriculation book, he describes himself as 'Scoto-Hibernus.' His early education was directed by an uncle, and in his studies, for the ministry, he was assisted by John Abernethy, the leader of the nonsubscribing section of the presbyterians of Ulster. Duchal went to Glasgow College, where he entered the moral philosophy class on 9 March 1710, and subsequently graduated M.A. Early in 1721, he became minister of a congregation in Cambridge meeting in Green Street, Cambridge, which had in part seceded in 1696 from Joseph Hussey's after it became congregationalist. The congregation, numbering three hundred people, was subsidized by a grant from the presbyterian board. Duchal had leisure for study, and lived much among books, with the habits of a valetudinarian. In later life, he referred to his Cambridge period as the 'most delightful' part of his career.

In 1730 Abernethy was called from Antrim to Dublin, and Duchal became his successor. An entry in the Antrim records states that on 'agwst the 14 1730 Mr. James Dwchhill came to Antrim and on the 16 of it which was owr commwnion sabath preached and served tw tabels which was his first work with ws.' He was installed on 6 September. On 7 September, William Holmes was ordained as the first minister of the subscribing section that had seceded from Abernethy 's congregation in 1726. Duchal began (anonymously) a controversy with Holmes, and the pamphlets which ensued formed the closing passage in a discussion which had agitated Ulster presbyterianism from 1720. Abernethy's death on 1 December 1740 was followed early in 1741 by the death of Richard Choppin, his senior colleague in the ministry at Wood Street, Dublin. The sole charge as their successor was offered to Thomas Drennan, father of William Drennan, M.D., who declined, and recommended Duchal. Duchal moved to Dublin in 1741. His delicate health and shy disposition kept him out of society; he approves the maxim that 'a man, if possible, should have no enemies, and very few friends' (Sermons, 1762, i. 469). His closest intimates were William Bruce (1702–1765) and Gabriel Cornwall (d. 1786), both his juniors. He was affable to young students, and gave medical advice among the poor.

Duchal was assisted at Wood Street in 1745 by Archibald Maclaine, D.D., the translator of Mosheim, but he had no regular colleague till 1747, when Samuel Bruce (1722–1767), father of William Bruce, D.D. (1757–1841), was appointed. In the opinion of his friends, the demands of his calling shortened Duchal's days. He died unmarried on 4 May 1761, having completed his sixty-fourth year.

== Works ==
In 1728 Duchal published a volume of sermons, which show the influence of Francis Hutcheson. Duchal's studies were classical and philosophical rather than biblical. Late in life, he returned to the study of Hebrew, to test the positions of the Hutchinsonian system, in which he found nothing congenial to his ideas. Duchal was an indefatigable writer of sermons: discourses in sets, like courses of lectures. A series devoted to 'presumptive arguments' for Christianity gained him when published (1753) the degree of D.D. from Glasgow. He composed aloud, while taking his daily walks, and committed the finished discourse to paper at great speed, in fine crowquill penmanship. He left seven hundred sermons as the fruit of his Dublin ministry.

From a robust Calvinistic orthodoxy, Duchal passed by degrees to an interpretation of Christianity from which every distinctive trace of orthodoxy had vanished. Francis Blackburne (according to Joseph Priestley) questioned 'his belief of the Christian revelation'. Although the Dictionary of National Biography states that 'for this suspicion there is no ground'. Clarke Irwin states that, in 'Presumptive Arguments for the ... Christian Religion,' he "strongly asserts the Deity of the Lord Jesus Christ". Andrew Kippis observed that William Leechman plagiarised (1768) the substance and treatment of three sermons by Duchal on the spirit of Christianity (1762).

Duchal is also known as a biographer of Irish non-subscribing clergy. The original draft of seven sketches, without names, was printed (Christian Moderator, April 1827, p. 431) from a copy by Thomas Drennan; the first three are Michael Bruce (1686–1735), Samuel Haliday, and Abernethy. They were worked up, with some softening of the criticism, in the funeral sermon for Abernethy, with appended biographies (1741). Thomas Witherow erroneously assigns these biographies to James Kirkpatrick, D.D.

He published:

- The Practice of Religion, 1728, three sermons; one of these is reprinted in The Protestant System, vol. i. 1758.
- A Letter from a Gentleman, Dublin, 1731, anon., answered by Holmes, Plain Reasons, Dublin, 1732).
- Remarks upon "Plain Reasons", Belfast, 1732, anon., answered by Holmes, Impartial Reflections, Belfast, 1732).
- A Sermon on occasion of the ... death of ... John Abernethy, Belfast, 1741, preached at Antrim 7 December 1740; appended are Duchal's Memoirs of the Revs. T. Shaw, W. Taylor, M. Bruce, and S. Haliday; the publication was edited by Kirkpatrick, who added a "conclusion".
- Memoir (anon.) of Abernethy, prefixed to his posthumous Sermons, 1748.
- Second Thoughts concerning the Sufferings and Death of Christ, 1748, anon.
- Presumptive Arguments for the Truth and Divine Authority of the Christian Religion, 1753, 11 sermons, with explanatory preface.
- Funeral sermons for: Mrs. Bristow, Belfast, 1736; Rev. Hugh Scot, Belfast, 1736; 10. J. Arbuckle, M.D., Dublin, 1747.
- Prefatory Letter to Gabriel Cornwall's Essay on the Character of the late Mr. William Bruce, 1755, dated 25 August.

Posthumous were:

- Sermons, vol. i., Dublin, 1762, vols. ii. iii., Dublin, 1764.
- On the Obligation of Truth, as concerned in Subscriptions to Articles, published in Theological Repository, 1770, ii. 191 sq.
- Letter to Dr. Taylor on the Doctrine of Atonement, Theol. Repos. 1770, ii. 328 sq.; reprinted in William Graham's The Doctrine of Atonement, 1772.

Other essays from Duchal's manuscripts sent to Priestley for publication were lost in the passage to Liverpool. Six small volumes, containing 47 autograph sermons by Duchal, 1721–40, which on 18 November 1783 were in possession of William Crawford, D.D., were presented by James Gibson, Q.C., to the library of Magee College, Derry.

Presbyterian Church titles
Preceded by Richard Choppin	Minister of Wood Street Presbyterian Church, Dublin; 1741–1761; With: Samuel Bruce,1747-1761	Succeeded by Samuel Bruce; John Mears
