= Paul Cardale =

English dissenting minister

Paul Cardale (1705 – 28 February 1775) was an English dissenting minister.

== Life ==
He was educated at the dissenting academy of Ebenezer Latham, M.D., at Findern, Derbyshire, from 1720. Early in life he became an assistant minister for the Presbyterians at Kidderminster, and preached there in 1726. At this time his views, in accordance with his education, were Calvinistic.

He was invited in 1733 by the Presbyterians of Evesham to succeed his fellow-student, Francis Blackmore, M.A., who had moved in 1730 to Coventry. The congregation was small, but after Cardale's settlement it afforded to build a small new meeting-house, in Oat Street (licensed 11 October 1737). Cardale's first series of sermons after the opening was circulated in manuscript, and ultimately published; he had now abandoned his Calvinism.

Cardale was well known only to a few literary divines. One of these was John Rawlins, M.A., an Anglican of Catholic sympathies, who among other preferments held the perpetual curacy of Badsey, two miles from Evesham. His closest friend, away from his own neighbourhood, was Caleb Fleming, who shared his opinions, and went down from London to visit him. Joseph Priestley, to whom Cardale sent two pieces for the Theological Repository, did not know him personally. Though not popular as a preacher, Cardale as a writer on Socinian theology proved influential, and the manuscript of his most important publication, ‘True Doctrine,’ was revised by Nathaniel Lardner. Latterly, his sedentary habits impaired his health, but his mind was keen.

On 28 February 1775 he put the finishing touch to a work, retired to rest, and died in his sleep before dawn on Wednesday, 1 March. He was buried in the north aisle of All Saints', Evesham, with an epitaph written by his friend Rawlins. Cardale married Sarah Suffield, a lady of some property, three years his senior, who died without issue about 1767. Robert Brook Aspland remarks that it was not till after her death that he began to publish those of his works which were considered heretical.

== Works ==
He published:

- The Gospel Sanctuary, 1740, (seven sermons from Ex. xx. 24).
- A New Office of Devotion, 1758 (anon.).
- The Distinctive Character and Honour of the Righteous Man, 1761, (funeral sermon from Matt. xiii. 43, for Rev. Francis Blackmore).
- The True Doctrine of the New Testament concerning Jesus Christ, 1767, 2nd ed. 1771 (anon.; has prefatory essay on private judgment, and appendix on Jo. i. The main argument is in the form of a letter, and signed "Phileleutherus Vigorniensis").
- A Comment upon … Christ's Prayer at the close of his Public Ministry, 1772, (anon.)
- A Treatise on the Application of certain Terms … to Jesus Christ, 1774, (anon.)

Posthumous was

- An Enquiry whether we have any Scripture-warrant for a direct Address … to the Son or to the Holy Ghost?, 1776, (edited by Caleb Fleming; prefixed is a short notice of Cardale, and appended is a letter (1762) from Lardner to Fleming on the personality of the Holy Ghost).

His contributions to the Theological Repository are "The Christian Creed" in vol. i. 1769, p. 136, and "A Critical Inquiry" into Phil. ii. 6, in vol. ii. 1771, pp. 141, 219. Cardale bequeathed his manuscripts to Fleming. Except the Enquiry, which was ready for press, they were mainly devotional.
