= Samuel Bourn the Younger =

English dissenting minister (1689–1754)

Samuel Bourn the Younger (1689 – 22 March 1754) was an English dissenting minister. He was a Presbyterian, preaching on protestant values learned from the New Testament. Through his published sermons, he entered the theological debate that flourished around the Arian controversy, and the doctrinal question as to Man's essential nature. He contested the Deism of the Norwich rationalists in the early enlightenment, and challenged the Trinitarian conventional wisdoms about the seat of humanity and its origins.

== Life ==
Samuel Bourn was the second son of Samuel Bourn the Elder, and was born at Calne, Wiltshire. He was taught classics at Bolton and trained for the ministry in the Manchester dissenting academy of John Chorlton and James Coningham. His first settlement was at Crook, near Kendal, in 1711. He carried with him his father's theology, but at his ordination, he declined subscription, not from particular scruples, but on general principles; as a result, many of the neighbouring ministers refused to concur in ordaining him. Joshua Toulmin says "the received standard of orthodoxy" which was proffered to him was the assembly's catechism.

In 1719, when the Salters' Hall conference had made the Trinitarian controversy a burning question among dissenters, Bourn, hitherto Athanasian, addressed himself to reading Samuel Clarke and Daniel Waterland, and accepted the Clarkean scheme. While at Crook, Bourn dedicated a child (probably of Baptist parentage) without baptism, according to a form given by Toulmin.

In 1720 Bourn succeeded Henry Winder at Tunley, near Wigan. He declined in 1725 a call to the neighbouring congregation of Park Lane, but accepted a call (dated 29 December 1727) to the new chapel at Chorley. On 7 May 1731 Bourn was chosen one of the Monday lecturers at Bolton, a post which he held along with his Chorley pastorate. On 19 April 1732 Bourn preached the opening sermon at the New Meeting, which replaced the Lower Meeting, Birmingham. On 21 and 23 April he was called to be colleague with Thomas Pickard in the joint charge of this congregation and a larger one at Coseley, where he was to settle. He began this ministry on 25 June. He preached at this church from 1732 until his death in 1754.

Bourn was harassed by John Ward of Sedgley Park, who sought to compel him to take and maintain a parish apprentice. Bourn twice appealed to the quarter sessions, and pleaded his own cause successfully. Subsequently, on 15 December 1738, Ward and another justice tried to remove him from Sedgley parish to his last legal settlement, on the pretext that he was likely to become chargeable. Toulmin prints his reply. After Pickard's death, his colleague was Samuel Blyth.

In 1739, Bourn published a revised and anti-Trinitarian version of James Strong's catechism; by the 1750s it had been reprinted several times and was largely responsible for a shift away from Calvinism in Presbyterian schools.

In 1751 Bourn declined a call to succeed John Buck (d. 8 July 1750) in his father's congregation at Bolton. He died at Coseley of paralysis on 22 March 1754.

== Controversy ==
Bourn had a hot temper, and was not averse to controversy, repelling a field-preacher, or attacking Quakers in their own meeting-house; and with difficulty was held back by his friend Job Orton from replying on the spot to the doctrinal confession of a young independent minister, who was being ordained at the New Meeting, lent for the occasion. He engaged in correspondence on the 'Logos' (1740–2) with Philip Doddridge (printed in Theological Repository vol. i.); on subscription (1743) with the Kidderminster dissenters; on dissent (1746) with Groome, vicar of Sedgley. In his catechetical instructions, founded on the assembly's catechism, he used that manual rather as a point of departure than as a model of doctrine. Although he had a great name for heterodoxy, his preaching was seldom polemical, but full of unction, as were his prayers.

== Works ==
Bourn's publications were:

- The Young Christian's Prayer Book; 1733; 2nd ed. Dublin, with preface by John Leland.; 3rd ed. enlarged, 1742; 4th and best edition, 1748.
- An Introduction to the History of the Inquisition (anon.), 1735.
- Popery a Craft, and Popish Priests the chief Craftsmen, 1735, (a Fifth of November sermon on Acts of Apostles, xix. 25, reprinted in A Cordial for Low Spirits, edited by Thomas Gordon, 2nd ed. 1763, edited by Rev. Richard Baron.
- An Address to Protestant Dissenters; or an Inquiry into the grounds of their attachment to the Assembly's Catechism . . . being a calm examination of the sixth answer ... by a Prot. Dissenter (anon.), 1736.
- A Dialogue betw. a Baptist and a Churchman; occasioned by the Baptists opening a new Meeting-House for reviving old Calvinistical doctrines and spreading Antinomian and other errors, at Birmingham, &c. Part I. by "a consistent Protestant" (anon.), 1737; Part II. by "a consistent Christian" (anon.), 1739.
- The Christian Family Prayer Book, with a recommendation by Isaac Watts, 1738 (frequently reprinted with additions. A prefixed Address to Heads of Families on Family Religion was reprinted by John Kentish, 1803).
- Address to the Congregation of Prot. Dissenters ... at the Castle Gate in Nottingham, &c., by a Prot. Dissenter (anon.), 1738 (in vindication of No. 4, which had been attacked by James Sloss of Nottingham).
- Lectures to Children and Young People … consisting of Three Catechisms. … with a preface, 1738 (prefixed is a recommendation by John Mottershead, Josiah Rogerson, Henry Grove, Thomas Amory, Samuel Chandler, and George Benson, whom Bourn describes as his close friend; appended is the revision of the assembly's catechism, by James Strong, minister at Ilminster; 2nd ed. 1739; 3rd ed. 1748 (with title, Religious Education, &c.); the third catechism of the set was re-edited by Job Orton as A Summary of Doctrinal and Practical Religion.
- The True Christian Way of Striving for the Faith of the Gospel, 1738 (sermon, on Philippians. i. 27, 28, at the Dudley double lecture, 23 May).
- Remarks on a pretended Answer to the last piece (anon.), 1739.
- The Christian Catechism, (anon.), 1744 (intended as a preservative against deism).
- Address in services at ordination of Job Orton on 18 Sept. 1745 at Shrewsbury (a charge, from 1 Thessalonians. ii. 10).
- The Protestant Catechism, (anon.), 1746.
- The Protestant Dissenters' Catechism ... by a lover of truth and liberty (anon.), 1747.
- A Vindication of the Principles and Practice of Protestant Dissenters, 1748.
- An Answer to the Remarks of an unknown Clergyman on the foregoing (anon.), 1748 (annexed is a letter from a London dissenter on kneeling at the Lord's Supper).
- A new Call to the Unconverted (anon.) 1754 (four sermons on Ezekiel, xxxiii. 2).
- (posthumous) Twenty Sermons on the most serious and practical subjects of the Christian Religion, 1755; 2nd ed. 1757. This contained a bibliography by Roger Flexman.
- Toulmin prints selections from his catechetical lectures on scripture history, and describes the manuscript of a projected work on The Scriptures of the O. T. digested under proper heads … according to the method of Dr. Gastrell, bishop of Chester.

== Family ==
Bourn married while at Crook (about 1712) Hannah Harrison (d. 1768), of a good family near Kendal. They had nine children:

1. Joseph, born 1713; educated at Glasgow; minister first at Congleton, then at Hindley (1746); married (1748) Miss Farnworth (d. 1785); died 17 Feb. 1765; his eldest daughter Margaret married Samuel Jones (d. 17 March 1819), the Manchester banker, uncle of Samuel Jones-Loyd, 1st Baron Overstone.
2. Samuel (1714-1796) who was also a preacher in the north of England.
3. Abraham, surgeon at Market Harborough, Leicester, and Liverpool; author of pamphlets ('Free and Candid Considerations,' &c., 1755, and 'A Review of the Argument,' &c., 1756) in reply to Peter Whitfield, a learned Liverpool printer and sugar-refiner, who left the dissenters and vigorously attacked their orthodoxy.
4. Benjamin, a London bookseller, author of 'A Sure Guide to Hell' (anon.), 1750, and supplement; he published some of his father's pieces.
5. Daniel, who built at Leominster what is said to have been the first cotton mill erected in England, an enterprise wrecked by a fire.
6. Miles, a mercer at Dudley.
7. John; died under age.

Two other children died young.
