= Richard Aslatt Pearce =

Victorian clergyman

Reverend Richard Aslatt Pearce
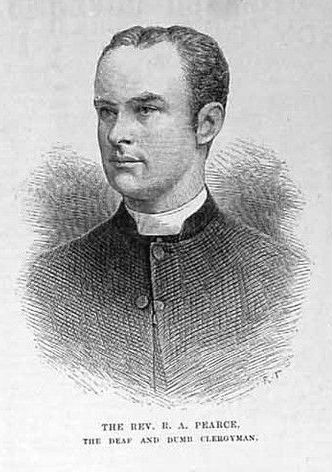
- Lithograph from photo by Hills & Saunders of Oxford

Personal life
- Born: 9 January 1855 Portswood
- Died: 21 July 1928 (aged 73) Winchester
- Home town: Winchester
- Spouse: Frances Mary Monck
- Parent: Richard S. Pearce
- Education: Christ Church Lodge, Winchester

Religious life
- Religion: Christianity
- Denomination: Anglicanism
- Institute: Winchester Diocesan Mission to the Deaf and Dumb
- Church: Mission Church, Oak Road, Southampton (demolished)
- Ordination: Deacon 1885; Chaplain to the Deaf and Dumb

Richard Aslatt Pearce (9 January 1855 – 21 July 1928) was the first deaf person to be ordained as an Anglican clergyman. He was educated via the sign language of his era, he became Chaplain to the Deaf and Dumb, (Note: This is an historical article about nineteenth- and early twentieth-century England, where the only meaning of the word "dumb" was "non-speaking", where it was not a pejorative term, and where the modern American usage of the word was unknown.) and he fulfilled this duty in the Southampton area for the rest of his life. In 1885 he was introduced to Queen Victoria, who then ordered the Royal Commission on the Blind, the Deaf and Dumb and Others of the United Kingdom, 1889.

== Background ==
=== Family ===
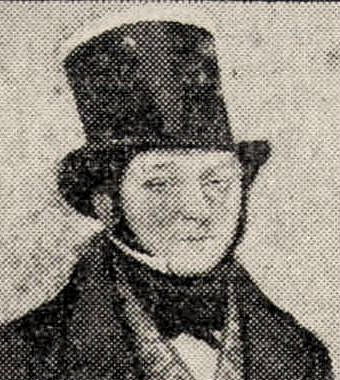
John Aslatt, grandfather of Rev. Pearce

Pearce came from a Southampton family. His paternal grandfather was Chatham-born officer of the Royal Navy Robert Pearce, (Note: Robert Pearce (1781–1851).) and Sarah née Seward, both of Southampton. (Note: Sarah née Seward (c.1788–1854). Marriage record: Robert Pearce and Sarah Seward 27 August 1810 Petersfield, Hampshire. GRO index: Deaths Jun 1854 Pearce Sarah Southampton 2c 10. Note: Sarah Pearce does not appear on the census after 1851.)

Their son, and the father of Richard Aslatt Pearce, was Richard Seward Pearce, (Note: Richard Seward Pearce (1820 – 28 December 1893). GRO index: Deaths Dec 1893 Pearce Richard Seward 73 South Stoneham 2c 46a) a solicitor and town clerk of Southampton, who married Frances Aslatt in 1854 at South Stoneham. (Note: Frances Aslatt (1830-1899). Baptised 20 Jan 1830 at All Saints' Church, Southampton to John Aslatt (later High Sheriff of Southampton) and Hester Martha Colson. GRO index: Marriages Jun 1854 Pearce Richard Seward and Aslatt Frances, S Stoneham vol2c p87 and Marriages Mar 1854 Pearce Richard Seward and Aslott Frances, S Stoneham vol2c p77. (this marriage was registered twice). Deaths Mar 1899 Pearce Frances 63 South Stoneham vol2c p69) Frances Aslatt was the daughter of John Aslatt, (Note: John Aslatt (1796 – 8 December 1859). GRO index: Deaths Dec 1859 Aslatt John S. Stoneham 2c 33.) liveried coach manufacturer of Above Bar, later high sheriff of Southampton 1845–1846, and his wife Hester Martha Colson. (Note: Hester Martha Colson (1793-1861). GRO index: Deaths Dec 1861 Aslatt Hester Martha S Stoneham 2c 29.)

Pearce was born in Portswood on 9 January 1855, (Note: Richard Aslatt Pearce (9 January 1855 – 21 July 1928). GRO index: Births Mar 1855 Pearce Richard Aslatt S Stoneham 2c 44. Deaths Sep 1928 Pearce Richard Aslatt 73 Winchester 2c 119.) one of four siblings of whom three were deaf. Two of his siblings were artist Walter Seward Pearce, (Note: Walter Seward (1862-1941). GRO index: Births Mar 1862 Pearce Walter Seward S Stoneham vol2c p58. Deaths Sep 1941 Pearce Walter S. 79 Winchester vol2c p206) and Fanny Pearce, (Note: Fanny Pearce (1863-1892). GRO index: Births Dec 1863 Pearce Fanny South Stoneham vol2c p51) all three described as "deaf and dumb from birth" in the 1881 Census. His single hearing sibling was solicitor Arthur William Pearce, who was mayor of Southampton 1917–1918. (Note: Arthur William Pearce (1858-1928). GRO index: Births Jun 1858 Pearce Arthur William S Stoneham 2c 48. Deaths Jun 1928 Pearce Arthur W. 70 Battle vol2b p83)

There are two indications that Pearce did not speak. One is that in his own handwriting on the 1911 Census form he differentiated himself, as "deaf and dumb", from his wife whom he described as "deaf." The second is the Hampshire Advertiser's description of his sermon at Golden Common in 1887, as "silent eloquence."

=== Education ===
Pearce's father paid £50 (equivalent to £5,256.36 in 2025) per year from 1860 to 1872, for him to attend the Brighton Institution for Deaf and Dumb Children at 127–132 Eastern Road, Kemptown, Brighton, where he received private tuition using only the manual system. His headmaster, who gave him personal tuition via the manual and sign system of that era, was William Sleight. The 1861 Census shows him at six years old, already at the Institution, when it had 82 inmates and two teachers besides the headmaster. In 1871 when Pearce was 16 years old, the Institution had 93 inmates, plus several former female inmates employed as servants and as an assistant teacher. Besides the headmaster who taught, the only other teachers besides the deaf former pupil, were an assistant master and a pupil teacher; however, all the inmates were described as "scholars". In that year, 40 of the inmates were of unknown origin, and 31 were of vague origin, where only the county or country were known. (Note: This raises the question of whether these were foundlings, orphans, or whether their parents had given up responsibility for them)

=== Marriage ===
Pearce met his wife Frances Mary Monck at St Saviour's, Oxford Street, in 1887, and they married on 26 April 1888. (Note: Frances Mary Monck (1845 or 1846 – 1930). GRO index: Deaths Dec 1930 Pearce Frances M. 85 Winchester vol2c p155. Marriages Jun 1888 Pearce Richard Aslatt, and Monck Frances Mary St. Geo. H. Sq. vol1a p773) She was born in Dublin, the daughter of Charles Monck, 4th Viscount Monck, who until 1869 had been Governor General of Canada. Her 1911 Census record, completed in her husband's handwriting, says that she was deaf "from illness". Her father did not want them to marry, believing that because they were both deaf, they would be poor, but they moved to Southampton where Pearce was to remain in employment, serving the deaf community for the rest of his life.

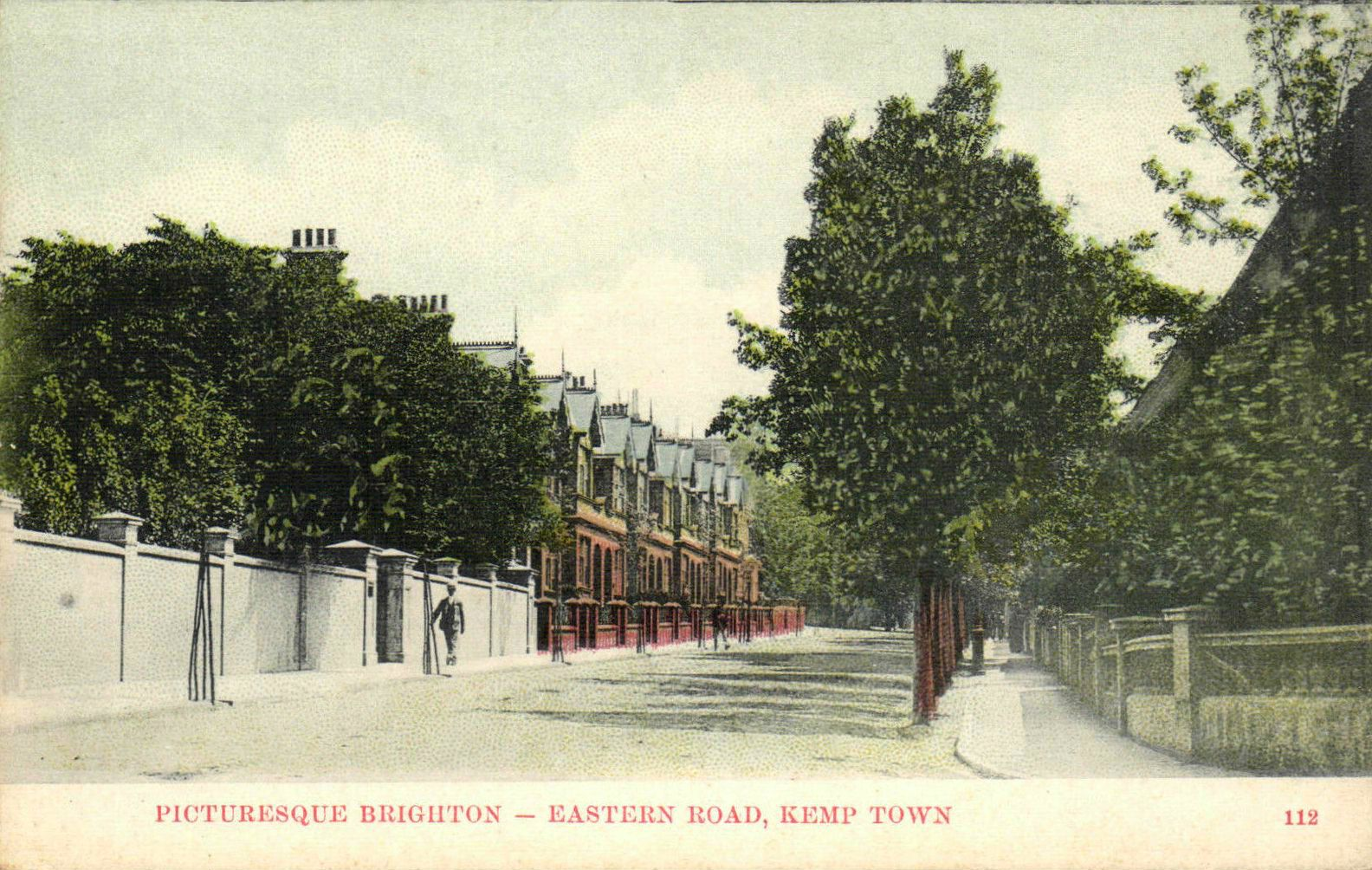
Eastern Road Brighton: location of the institution where Pearce was placed for 12 years from the age of five

Pearce and his wife had no children. It is not known whether Pearce's childlessness had any connection with recommendations of castration of the congenitally deaf by early 19th century eugenicists who held those views which were later developed by Francis Galton. In 1901 he and his wife were living at 2 Christ Church Road, Winchester, with two servants. The 1911 Census finds them living at Christ Church Lodge, Winchester, where he describes himself as "chaplain to the deaf and dumb in the Diocese of Winchester." It is not known why the same record, completed in R.A. Pearce's own hand, states that he and Frances were deaf "from illness," when according to his 1881 Census record, his father informed the enumerator that he was "deaf and dumb from birth." Similarly, the 1861 and 1871 Census, in which the enumerator was informed by the Brighton Institution, state that the inmate Pearce was "deaf and dumb from birth." However, by 1911 a congenital condition such as profound deafness could potentially have made him a target for eugenics. On 21 July 1928 he died in Winchester at his home, (Note: GRO index: Deaths Sep 1928 Pearce Richard A. 73 Winchester vol2c p11) two years before the death on 30 October 1930 of his wife Frances.

== Work ==
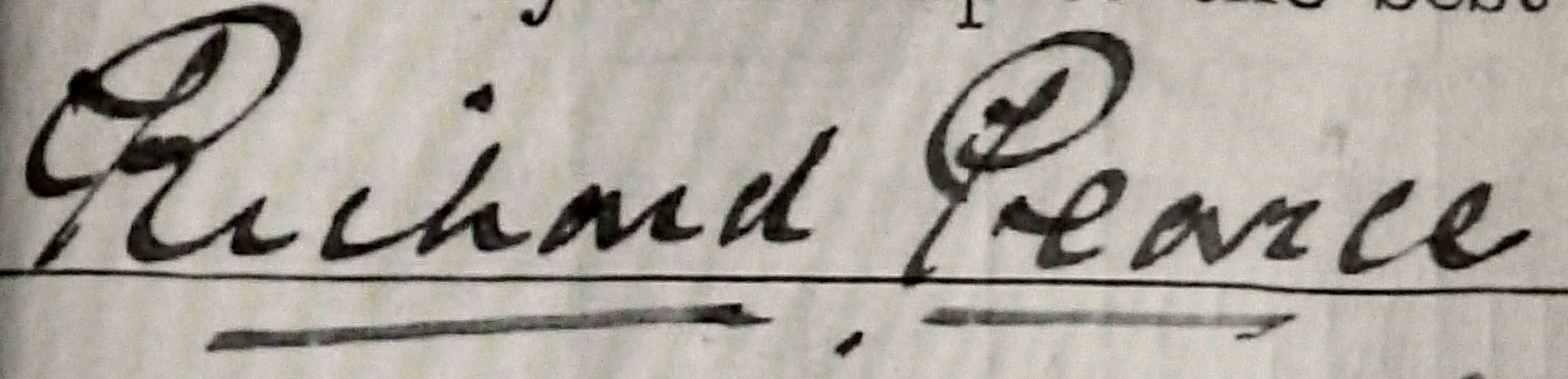
Signature of Rev. R.A. Pearce, from 1911 Census

Pearce left the Institution in 1872 to work in his father's office as a secretary, but in his free time he sought out other deaf people, assisted and educated them, and organised groups for Sunday worship. His group grew in size, so that his time was needed for more mission work with the deaf in Hampshire. By 1881 he was still living with his parents and siblings, describing himself as "lay reader to deaf and dumb," He was ordained deacon on Sunday 21 May 1885 by the Bishop of Winchester, after being mentored via sign language by Reverend Charles Mansfield Owen who was at that time vicar of St George's Church, Edgbaston and was later to become Dean of Ripon. Thus Pearce became, "the first deaf ... clergyman to be ordained in the Church of England." In the same year he became Chaplain to the Deaf and Dumb, employed by the Winchester Diocesan Mission to the Deaf and Dumb, which itself had been established by the efforts of Owen. This organisation founded the Mission Church in Oak Road, Southampton (now demolished), for the continuation of their work in 1891. It was completed in 1895 with the financial assistance of Sir Arthur Henderson Fairbairn (1852–1915) who was deaf, and other supporters. The Portsmouth Evening News said this:

"It is gratifying to recall the fact that the Winchester diocese is the first, and, probably the only one, to devote special attention to the deaf and dumb. For many years the Rev. F. Pearce [sic], himself afflicted in this way, has laboured among them with rare devotion and success, and now, thanks to the munificence of Sir A. Fairbairn, Bart., of Brambridge House, a church for the deaf and dumb has been opened at Northam, the dedication sermon of the Bishop being interpreted to the congregation by the finger and sign language by Canon Owen."

Because he was the first deaf person to be ordained as an Anglican clergyman, Pearce was invited to meet Queen Victoria who "knew deaf people on the Isle of Wight":

"Her Majesty the Queen, who, as is so well known, is always interested in the deaf and dumb, having heard much of the good work done by both Mr. Pearce and Mr. Owen, expressed her wish to see both gentlemen, and accordingly they had the honour of being presented to the Queen and Her Royal Highness the Princess Beatrice, at Osborne House, on the 16th of January 1886.

After meeting Pearce, the Queen requested a Royal Commission on the Blind, the Deaf and Dumb and Others of the United Kingdom, which completed its report in 1889. It included the comment: "The missionary under the bishop of the diocese [of Winchester] (the Rev. R.A. Pearce, who is the only ordained deaf and dumb clergyman in the Church of England) devotes the whole of his time to the work, visiting the deaf and dumb at their homes, or at places of business and workshops." In 1886 Pearce also visited the Institute for the Deaf and Dumb at Derby.

In November 1887, Pearce preached a sermon at St Saviour's in London. "It was a grand service, and was most highly appreciated." On 20 November 1887, he took a communion service and preached a sermon for deaf and hearing people at Holy Trinity, Colden Common, near Winchester, Hampshire. "The deepest attention was paid by the congregations throughout the whole of the services, who perfectly understood them, and expressed hope that the sermon would be long remembered. The parishioners of Golden Common were evidently deeply impressed by the reverential manner and silent eloquence of the preacher." On 26 April 1888 he became Reverend of Christ Church Lodge at Winchester. In Brighton in 1912, Pearce served as interpreter at the funeral of William Sleight, who had provided his school education. He retired in 1924, having served in the diocese for 43 years.

== Historical context ==
To put Pearce into the context of his time, although he was the first deaf Anglican preacher whose service was formally ratified by ordination and benefice, he was not the first or only person to preach to the deaf by sign language in England. For example, in 1846, before Pearce was born, the Leeds Intelligencer cites two instances which drew praise in Yorkshire:

"There has been for some time past a chapel in Red-Lion Square [in Leeds], (Note: Possibly near the site of the Red Lion in Hunslet, near Tetley's brewery and a Congregational church) in which public worship is performed twice every Sunday for the sole benefit of the deaf ... The service is that of the Church of England – singing and the music of the organ being as a matter of course omitted. The experiment of communicating to those ... deprived of hearing ... a knowledge of the great Truths ... by means of those "signs" which constitute a language in themselves, has been eminently successful. In the morning the chapel in Red-Lion Square is attended by from 20 to 30 deaf ... persons. After the usual prayers had been gone through, the teacher commented at considerable length, by means of gestures, on the 11th Chapter of the 1st of Samuel, his audience seeming to comprehend every idea which he sought to convey ... At the same time, we may state, that at Dalton, near Huddersfield, resides Mr. Henry Roxby, a young man, a native of Hull, wholly deaf ... He preaches to [the deaf] almost every Sunday, chiefly at Cliff End, but occasionally at Mirfield and Halifax and some other places. We are informed that he purposes to visit London. He is in a humble sphere of life, but is the main support of his aged mother, a widow. His preaching to the deaf ... is really worthy of being witnessed if for nothing else than to see his expressive and emphatic manner, and the strict attention which is paid to him by the [deaf] ... The facility with which he communicated knowledge ... is remarkable."

== See also ==
- Charles Baker (instructor)
