= John Henry Reynolds (educator) =

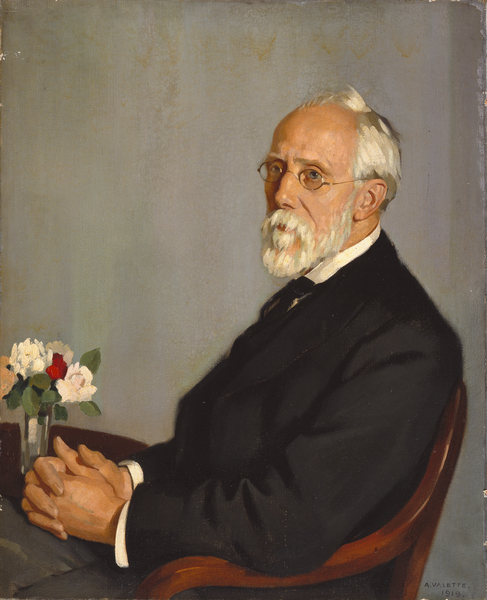
- Portrait of Reynolds by Pierre Adolphe Valette, 1919
- Born: 8 February 1842
- Died: 17 July 1927 (aged 85)

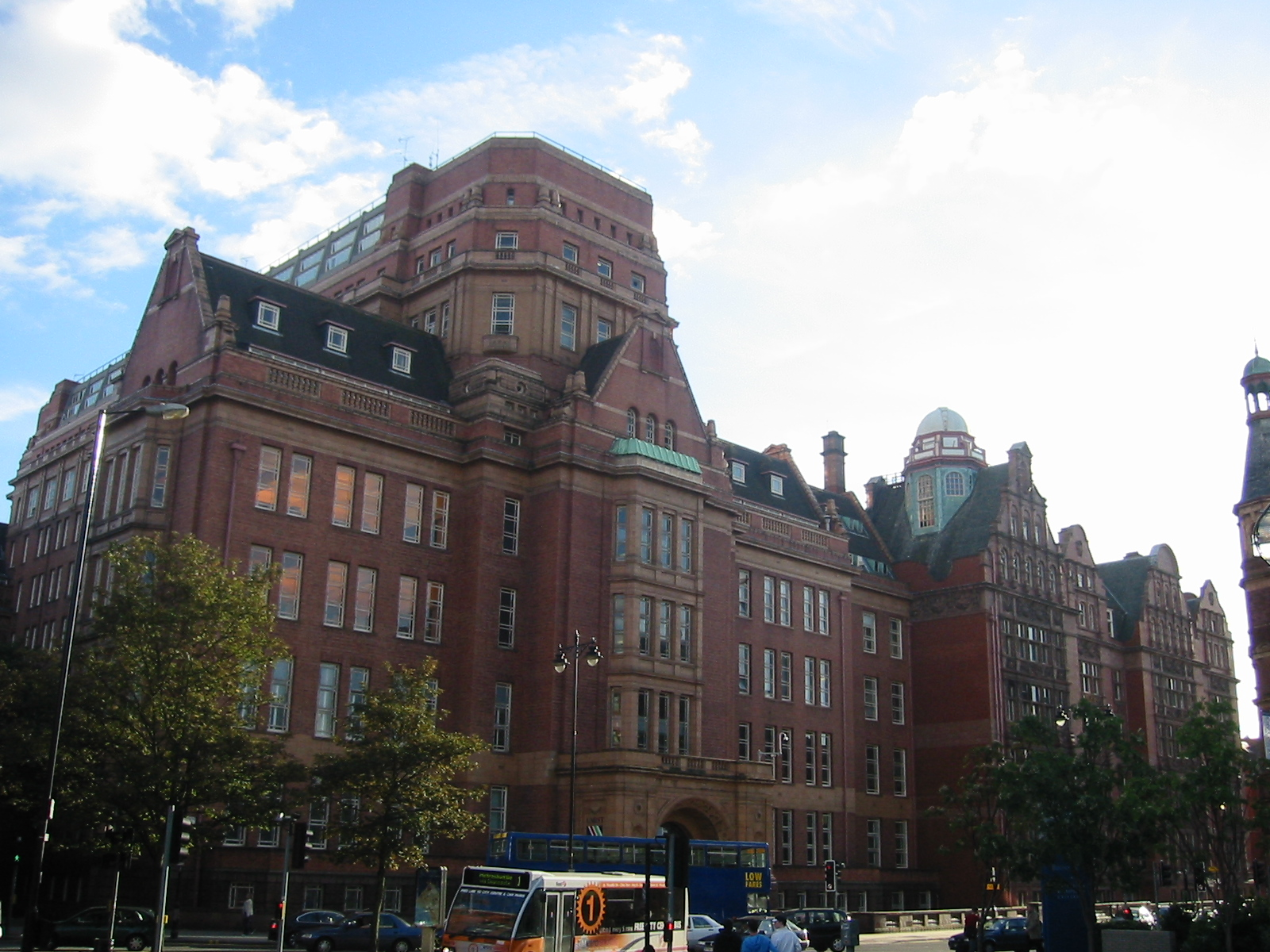
UMIST Main Building

John Henry Reynolds (8 February 1842 – 17 July 1927) was a British educationist and administrator, particularly associated with the development of the Manchester educational institution that was to go on to become UMIST.

== Life ==
Born in Salford, Lancashire, the eldest of eleven children of a bootmaker, he attended the day school of the Cross Street Unitarian Chapel before a year at the Manchester Grammar School prepared him for apprenticeship to his father at age twelve. He also assisted at the Sunday School at Cross Street where he met William Fairbairn and William Gaskell. In 1868, he married Ellen Ferguson at the chapel and they went on to have three children.

By the 1870s, the Manchester Mechanics' Institute was in decline. Despite its original ambitious mission to bring technical expertise to working men, its core activities had shrunk to the provision of elementary education where it faced increasing competition from the state-funded schools established by the Elementary Education Act 1870 (33 & 34 Vict. c. 75). In 1879, Reynolds was appointed Secretary to the Institute and immediately set about its rejuvenation. An able and active administrator, and an enthusiastic and persuasive advocate, Reynolds grasped the city's appetite for more effective vocational education and planned and led the relaunch of the institution as the Manchester Technical School in 1882.

Reynolds still did not rest. He reorganised the school using the schemes and examinations of the City and Guilds of London Institute and, following legislation in 1889 and 1890, negotiated the school's transfer to Manchester City Council as the Municipal Technical School. Reynolds took a role in the city authority as director of technical instruction and set out to survey the superior establishments in Germany and Switzerland and the thriving schools of the United States and Canada.

He was elected to membership of the Manchester Literary and Philosophical Society on 15 October 1901

A grant from the Whitworth Institute enabled him to realise his ambitions for a state-of-the-art institution with the construction of the existing buildings on Sackville Street, opened in 1902 by Arthur Balfour. The institution was renamed as the Municipal School of Technology and Reynolds became its principal and director for higher education of Manchester.

In 1904, the newly-autonomous Victoria University of Manchester recognised the status of many of the courses that Reynolds had developed by establishing a faculty of technology at the Institute. Reynolds became dean of the faculty, enjoying an ex officio seat on the university's senate. The Institute's newly appointed professors were recognised by the university. However, consistent with Reynolds' radical sympathies, the bulk of the Institute's work was still devoted to vocational, rather than academic, education.

Reynolds lived most of his later life in Cheadle Hulme. He died while on holiday with his family in Anglesey.

== Honours ==
- Honorary M.Sc. Victoria University, (1902)

== Bibliography ==
- Cardwell, D. S. L. (ed.) (1974) Artisan to Graduate: Essays to Commemorate the Foundation in 1824 of the Manchester Mechanics' Institution, Manchester: Manchester University Press, ISBN 0-7190-1272-4
- — (2004) "Reynolds, John Henry (1842-1927)", Oxford Dictionary of National Biography, Oxford University Press, accessed 18 June 2005 (subscription, Wikipedia Library access or UK public library membership required)
- Marshall, J.D. (1964) "John Henry Reynolds, pioneer of technical education in Manchester", Vocational Aspect 16/35, 176–96
