= John Seddon (Unitarian) =

English Unitarian minister

John Seddon (1719–1769) was an English Unitarian minister.

== Life ==
The son of Peter Seddon (1689–1731), dissenting minister at Penrith, Cumberland (1717–19), and Cockey Moor in the parish of Middleton, Lancashire (1719–31), he was born in 1719 at Lomax Fold, Little Lever, in the parish of Bolton, Lancashire. On his father's death, Seddon's education was undertaken by the congregation of Cross Street, Manchester. He was at Stand Grammar School under William Walker; then at the Kendal Academy (entered 1733) under Caleb Rotheram; and at Glasgow University from 1739, where he was a pupil of Francis Hutcheson. He is said to have graduated M.A., but of this there is no record.

On leaving Glasgow, he became assistant at Cross Street to Joseph Mottershead, and was ordained on 22 October 1742. He was a preacher of facility and power, and pursued an independent line in theology. Joseph Priestley, when at Warrington (1761–8), speaks of Seddon as "the only Socinian in the neighbourhood".

Seddon advocated the doctrine of the simple humanity of Christ. He embodied his views in a series of six sermons, of which the first was preached on 27 May 1761. A contemporary account describes the excitement produced by his utterances; his outspokenness won for him increased respect, though he made few converts. The sermons were not published till 1793. They anticipated the historical argument of Priestley.

Seddon lived on good terms with neighbouring clergy, especially with John Clayton, the Jacobite.

After a long illness, Seddon died on 22 November 1769, and was buried in Cross Street Chapel. His library was sold on 26 February 1770.

== Family ==
He married, in 1743, Mottershead's eldest daughter, Elizabeth (died 1765), and left a son, Mottershead Seddon.

The preacher John Seddon of Warrington (1725–1770), with whom he is often confused, is said to have been a second cousin.

== Works ==
He edited, with preface, The Sovereignty of the Divine Administration, &c., 1766, by Thomas Dixon (1721–1754). His Discourses on the Person of Christ, Warrington, 1793, were edited with An Account of the Author, by Ralph Harrison, at the suggestion of Joshua Toulmin.
