= Joseph Mottershead =

English minister (1688–1771)

Joseph Mottershead (1688–1771) was an English dissenting minister.

== Life ==
The son of Joseph Mottershead, yeoman, he was born near Stockport, Cheshire, on 17 August 1688. He was educated at Attercliffe Academy under Timothy Jollie, and afterwards studied for a year under Matthew Henry at Chester.

After licence he preached (1710–12) at Kingsley, in the parish of Frodsham, Cheshire. On 5 August 1712 he was ordained at Knutsford as successor to Samuel Lawrence at Nantwich. Matthew Henry visited him in 1713, and died at his house in 1714. In 1717 Mottershead became minister of Cross Street Chapel, Manchester, and held this post till his death; his colleagues were Joshua Jones, John Seddon, and Robert Gore (1748–1779).

When the Young Pretender entered Manchester in November 1745, Mottershead was selected as hostage for a monetary fine; but he had a warning in good time and made his escape. During his long ministry at Manchester, Mottershead, whom Robert Halley calls ‘a very quiet peaceable man,’ passed from Calvinism to a type of Arianism. About 1756 there was a secession from the congregation owing to the Socinian tenets of Seddon, his colleague and son-in-law.

Mottershead died on 4 November 1771, and was buried near the pulpit in his meeting-house. His portrait, by Henry Pickering, was engraved by William Pether.

== Works ==
Mottershead published, besides two sermons (1719–1745), ‘Religious Discourses,’ &c., Glasgow, 1759. Under the signature ‘Theophilus’ he contributed essays to Joseph Priestley's Theological Repository, 1769, i. 173, sq., 225 sq., and 1771, iii. 112 sq. He also published a revised edition of Matthew Henry's ‘Plain Catechism’ (no date).

== Family ==
He married, first, at Kingsley, the eldest daughter of Bennett of Hapsford, Cheshire; she died in October 1718, leaving four children:

- his only son was educated at Edinburgh as a physician, but took Anglican orders, acted as curate in Manchester, and was lost at sea as chaplain of a man-of-war;
- his eldest daughter Elizabeth married (February 1743) John Seddon, his colleague; they had a son, named Mottershead Seddon.
- his second daughter, Sarah, married John Jones, founder of the banking house of Jones, Loyd, & Co., whose grandson was Samuel Jones Loyd, 1st Baron Overstone.

He married, secondly, in January 1721, Margaret (d. 31 Jan. 1740), widow of Nathaniel Glaskell of Manchester; he was her third husband.

He married, thirdly, in June 1742, Abigail (d. 28 Dec. 1753), daughter of Chewning Blackmore, and granddaughter of William Blackmore (minister).

== Notes ==
Attribution

This article incorporates text from a publication now in the public domain: "Mottershead, Joseph". Dictionary of National Biography. London: Smith, Elder & Co. 1885–1900.
