= William Turner (Unitarian minister) =

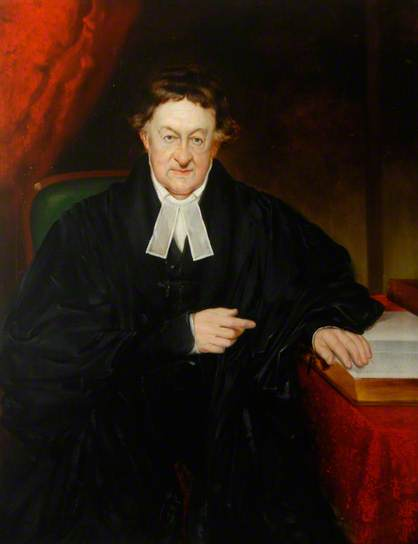
William Turner

William Turner (1761–1859) was a Unitarian minister and educator who advanced the anti-slavery movement in Northern England, contributed to the development of intellectual institutions in Newcastle upon Tyne, and published sermons on a variety of topics.

== Life ==
His father was William Turner (and another William Turner was his son). He was born at Wakefield on 20 September 1761. He was educated at Warrington Academy (1777–81) and Glasgow University (1781–2).

On 25 September 1782 he was ordained pastor of the Hanover Square congregation, Newcastle upon Tyne. He ministered at Newcastle for fifty-nine years, retiring on 20 September 1841. He was a main founder (1793) of the Literary and Philosophical Society at Newcastle, and acted as secretary till 1833; a founder of the Natural Historical Society (1824); and a member of the Portico Library. He was a chief projector of the Newcastle branch of the Bible Society, and one of its secretaries till 1831.

From 1808 till his death he was visitor of Manchester College (then at York) and until 1840 he delivered the visitor's annual address. Among the subscribers to a volume of his sermons published in 1838 appeared the names of two bishops, who by their action incurred some censure (see Edward Maltby).

He died at Lloyd Street, Greenheys, Manchester, on 24 April 1859, and was buried on 28 April in the graveyard of Upper Brook Street chapel. His portrait, by Morton, and his bust, by Bailey, were placed in the rooms of the Literary and Philosophical Society of Newcastle.

== Works ==
A list of his publications is in the Christian Reformer, 1859, p. 459. This does not include his contributions to periodicals, usually signed V. F. [i.e. Vigilii Filius]; with this signature he contributed to the Monthly Repository, 1810 and 1811, a series of articles relating to Warrington Academy.

== Family ==
He married, first, in 1784, Mary (d. 16 Jan. 1797), daughter of Thomas Holland of Manchester; secondly, on 8 June 1799, Jane (d. 1855), eldest daughter of William Willets, minister at Newcastle-under-Lyme. He survived all but one of his children.

== See also ==
- Henry Atkinson (scientist)
- Newcastle Literary and Philosophical Society
