= Henry Finch (priest) =

English ejected minister

Henry Finch (1633–1704) was an English ejected minister.

== Biography ==
Finch was born at Standish, Lancashire, and baptised on 8 September 1633. He was educated at the grammar schools of Standish and Wigan. Calamy does not say at what university he graduated. After preaching in the Fylde country (between the Lune and the Ribble) he was presented in 1656 to the vicarage of Walton-on-the-Hill, Lancashire, a parish which then included the town of Liverpool. He was a member of the fifth presbyterian classis of Lancashire.

In July 1659 he took an active part in the plans for the rising of the 'new royalists' under Sir George Booth. His property was seized by the parliamentary sequestrators, and not restored. Unable then to accept the terms of the Uniformity Act 1662, he was ejected. He retired to Warrington, where he lived for some years in dependence on his wife's relatives. The Five Mile Act (1665) compelled him to leave, and he settled in Manchester (not then a corporate town), where he supported himself by keeping a school.

Both at Warrington and Manchester he attended the ordinary services of the Church of England, preaching only occasionally on Sunday evenings in his own dwelling to such restricted gatherings as the law allowed. On the indulgence of 1672 he took out a licence as a 'general presbyterian minister,' and officiated in the licensed 'private oratory' (Birch Chapel), which was in the hands of Thomas Birch of Birch Hall, Rusholme, Lancashire, though the legal owners were the warden and fellows of the collegiate church of Manchester. On 29 October 1672 he took part in the first ordination conducted by the ejected nonconformists, in the house of Robert Eaton at Deansgate, Manchester.

On the outbreak of the Monmouth Rebellion (1685) Finch was imprisoned at Chester; but later was allowed to resume his ministry. The Toleration Act (1689) called attention to the insecurity of his position: Birch Chapel, being a consecrated place, could not be licensed as a dissenting meeting-house. Finch, however, stayed on until the death of Thomas Birch the younger in 1697, when the chapel was ceded by his son, George Birch, to the legal owners. Finch then preached at licensed houses in Platt and Birch, till his friends built a meeting-house at Platt (1700), Finch himself contributing towards the erection. The opening discourse was preached by Finch's son-in-law, James Grimshaw of Lancaster, author of 'Rest from Rebels,' 1716.

Finch was a member of the provincial meeting of united ministers (presbyterian and congregational) formed in Lancashire in 1693 on the basis of the London 'agreement' of 1691, involving a doctrinal subscription. He preached before this meeting on two occasions, 4 August 1696, and 13 August 1700, both at Manchester. Edmund Calamy acknowledged Finch's corrections to his account of the silenced ministers. A strong supporter of the Glorious Revolution of 1688, Finch was also a charitable contributor to nonjurors.

Finch died on 13 November 1704, and was succeeded by Robert Hesketh, early in whose ministry the chapel was conveyed (25–26 October 1706) in trust for the maintenance of an 'orthodox' ministry.

== Family ==
Peter Finch (1661–1754), presbyterian minister, son of Henry Finch, was born on 6 October 1661. On 3 May 1678 he entered the non-conformist academy of Richard Frankland at Natland, Westmoreland. He soon moved on to the university of Edinburgh, where he graduated M.A. on 16 July 1680. His first employment was as chaplain in the family of William Ashhurst. In 1691 he was invited to become colleague at Norwich to Josiah Chorley; his first entry in the presbyterian register of baptisms is dated 1 June 1692. He remained at his post for over sixty-two years, and survived Edward Crane and Thomas Dixon the younger, both of whom had been designated as his successor. Himself a strict Calvinist, he contributed much, by his love of peace, to preserve concord when doctrinal differences threatened to divide his flock. From 1733 John Taylor was his colleague. He died on his ninety-third birthday, 6 October 1754, and was buried in the church of St. Peter Mancroft, Norwich. A small portrait of him hung in the vestry of the Octagon Chapel. His great-grandson, Peter, was mayor of Norwich in 1827.
