= James Coningham =

English presbyterian divine and tutor

James Coningham (1670–1716) was an English presbyterian divine and tutor.

== Life ==
Coningham was born in 1670 in England and educated at Edinburgh, where he graduated M.A. on 27 February 1694. The same year he became minister of the presbyterian congregation at Penrith. Here he employed himself in educating students for the ministry, probably with the concurrence of the "provincial meeting" of Cumberland and Westmorland. In 1700 he was chosen as colleague to John Chorlton at Cross Street Chapel, Manchester. He shared with Chorlton the tutorial work of the Manchester academy, and on Chorlton's death (1705) carried it on for seven years without assistance. His most distinguished pupils were Samuel Bourn the younger and John Turner of Preston, famous for his exertions against the rebel army in the 1715 Jacobite uprising.

During the reign of Queen Anne, Coningham was several times prosecuted for keeping an academy; and though a man who combined orthodoxy with a broad spirit, he was not strong enough to cope with the divergences of theological opinion in his flock. He left Manchester for London in 1712, being called to succeed Richard Stretton, M.A. (died 3 July 1712, aged 80), at Haberdashers' Hall. His health was broken, and he died on 1 September 1716.

== Works ==
Coningham published three sermons, 1705, 1714, and 1715, and wrote a preface to the second edition of Henry Pendlebury's ‘Invisible Realities,’ originally published 1696.
