= William Turner (minister at Wakefield) =

William Turner (1714–1794) was an English dissenting minister. He became liberal in theology, a supporter of rational dissent, and with his congregation in favour of social and political reform. He was a contributor to Theological Repository.

== Life ==
William Turner was born at Preston, Lancashire, on 5 December 1714. His father, John Turner (1689–1737), was a restless man, who was minister for short periods at Preston, Rivington, Northwich, Wirksworth, and Knutsford, distinguished himself on the Hanoverian side in the Jacobite Rebellion of 1715. His mother was Hannah Chorley (d. 20 February 1747), daughter of William Chorley of Preston.

From 1732 until 1736, Turner was educated at Findern Academy under Ebenezer Latham. He then attended Glasgow University from 1736-1737. He was dissenting minister at Allostock, Cheshire (1737–46). He was ordained on 7 August 1739. Ill-health caused him to retire from the ministry for eight years, during which he kept a school.

In 1754 he became minister at Congleton, Cheshire.

In 1758, Turner married Mary Holland, eldest daughter of John Holland of Mobberley, Cheshire. He had two sons, the elder being William Turner (1761–1859) the abolitionist.

In April 1761 he moved to Wakefield, where he continued to minister till July 1792. His Wakefield ministry brought him into close connection with Thomas Amory, the creator of John Buncle; with Joseph Priestley, then at Leeds, whose opinions he espoused; and with Theophilus Lindsey, then vicar of Catterick, of whose policy of inviting a Unitarian secession from the Church of England he disapproved.

Turner died on 28 August 1794.

== Works ==
Turner published sermons. His manuscript criticisms suggested to Priestley the project of his Theological Repository, to which Turner contributed (1768–71) as Vigilius (Wakefield). His notes in Priestley's Harmony of the Evangelists, 1780, are signed "T."
