= Bank Street Unitarian Chapel =

Church in Greater Manchester, England

Coordinates: 53.58026°N 2.42697°W

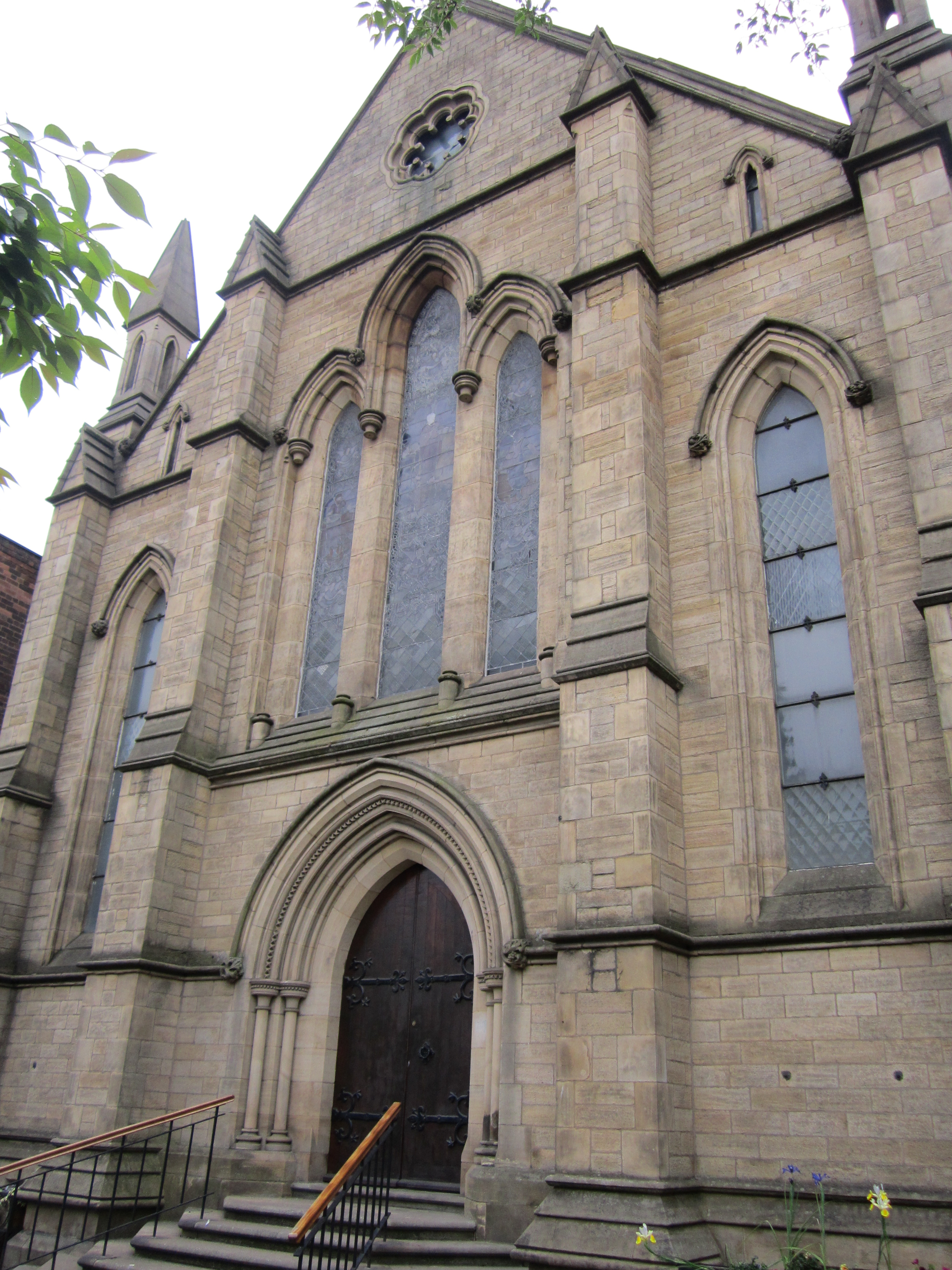
Bank Street Unitarian Chapel, Bolton

Bank Street Unitarian Chapel is a former Unitarian place of worship in Bolton, Greater Manchester, England.

== History ==
Bank Street Chapel has its origins in a congregation established by the ejected Presbyterian minister Richard Goodwin at Great Bolton, Lancashire, in 1672. He began preaching there after taking advantage of the Royal Declaration of Indulgence which relaxed the stipulations of the Five Mile Act 1665. Bolton had gained a reputation as a bastion of Puritanism during the English Civil War, when the attacking Cavalier forces called it the Geneva of the North, supposedly because of its similarities to the Calvinist stronghold of Geneva, although historian Malcolm Hardman notes that the sobriquet was "more out of irritation than accuracy". On his death in 1685, Goodwin was succeeded as minister by John Lever, who had also suffered ejection. Throughout this time, the congregation was based at a meeting house on the corner of Deansgate and Mealhouse Lane, which later became the Woolpack Inn.

Information varies regarding Lever's successor, Robert Seddon, who came from Prestolee and had attended the University of Cambridge. He had been ordained in 1854 and was a minister at Gorton before at some point moving to either Langley or Kirk Langley, both in Derbyshire. It was from there that he was ejected in 1662. Edward Baines says that he began preaching in Bolton in 1688, although his role as minister is agreed by other sources to have begun in 1692. He bought a house at Windy Bank, which later became known as Bank Street. He donated that to the congregation but died according to one account just before it opened as a chapel in 1696. Franklin Baker, who later became a minister at Bank Street, says Seddon ceased being minister in 1695. However, Baines says he lived to see the opening of the chapel and was the first minister there but died in 1696, and Herbert McLachlan, a Principal at the Manchester Unitarian College, says he donated the building in either 1695 or 1696 and died in 1699. He was succeeded by his nephew, Samuel Bourn.

The congregation, which by the 1720s amounted to over 1,000 people, initially followed the precepts of Presbyterianism but moved to Unitarianism around the time of the short ministry of Thomas Dixon junior, prior to Philip Holland taking charge. Hardman notes that the Bank Street ministers had "long been wrestling with problems of human morality in relation to divine grace" up to that time and that Dixon's changes caused a break-up among the congregation that "since 1672 [had been] the spiritual home of many of the old mercantile families of the neighbourhood". Some members left to join a congregation at Duke's Alley because of these changes.

In 1789, the incumbent minister, John Holland, the brother of Philip, established both a Sunday school and a library at the chapel. The congregation split in 1821 due to disagreements concerning appointment of a minister. While some people stayed at Bank Street, others moved to an alternate place of worship until in 1843 the two sides united once more. As at Renshaw Street Unitarian Chapel in Liverpool and at Cross Street Unitarian Chapel in Manchester, the congregation was predominantly liberal in politics and socially elite. They were also tight-knit: the alliances formed by marriage, mutual business interests and friendships were numerous and notable. One minister - Franklin Baker - married into the Crook family, who were members of the congregation.

The congregation held their last church service in May 2022.

== Building ==
The original Bank Street building, from Seddon's gift in the 1600s, was T-shaped but was replaced in 1856 by a George Woodhouse-designed structure, incorporating three pew doors from the original.

The building today carries a plaque commemorating its association with Eagle Street College, a group of local people who admired Walt Whitman and counted the chapel and its school among their meeting venues.

== Ministers ==
According to the book published on the occasion of the chapel's bicentennial in 1896, the early ministers of the congregation were:

- 1672–1685: Richard Goodwin, died in office
- 1685–1689: unrecorded, probably irregular ministry
- 1689–1692: John Lever, died in office
- 1692–1696: Robert Seddon, died in office
- 1696–1720: Samuel Bourn, died in office (nephew of Robert Seddon)
- 1720–1722: Peter Withington, died in office
- 1723–1729: Thomas Dixon senior, died in office
- 1729–1750: John Buck, died in office
- Not recorded by Baker and the bicentennial book
- 1752–1754: Thomas Dixon junior, died in office
- 1755–1789: Philip Holland, died in office
- 1789–1820: John Holland, retired, nephew of Philip
- 1821–1822: Noah Jones, resigned due to ill health (Note: The health of Noah Jones, who was born in 1801, recovered sufficiently for him to live until 1861. After Bolton, he was at some time a minister in Northampton and Derby and at Gateacre in Liverpool from 1848. He had been forced to leave the dissenting academy at Wymondley due to alleged doctrinal misconduct in 1820, just prior to his appointment at Bank Street.)
- 1823–1864: Franklin Baker, retired
- 1864–1873: Jeffery Worthington, moved to London
- 1874–1895: Charles Clement Coe, moved to Bournemouth
- 1896–: Christoper J. Street
