= Richard Goodwin (minister) =

Richard Goodwin (died 12 December 1685) was a minister of religion who instigated nonconformist worship in Bolton, Lancashire, in 1672, creating a congregation that later became known as Bank Street Unitarian Chapel.

Goodwin was born in Sussex around 1613. He was awarded an MA degree in 1639, having first entered Emmanuel College, Cambridge seven years earlier. He became a curate at Cockey Moor, near Ainsworth in Lancashire, in 1640 and in 1641 married Sarah, a daughter of Richard Crompton from Breightmet; she died in 1651. In 1644, he moved to Hull and then London before settling for some time at Hargrave in Northamptonshire. He was appointed as assistant minister in the parish of Bolton le Moors in 1647 and became sole minister a decade later. As a Presbyterian, he had to resign his ministry in the Great Ejection of 1662.

Prior to the arrival of Goodwin in what was then Great Bolton, the town had been a bastion of Puritanism and had been referred to by attacking forces during the English Civil War as the Geneva of the North, although the historian Malcolm Hardman notes that this comparison with the strict Calvinism found in Geneva was one made "more out of irritation than accuracy".

After his ejection, Goodwin lived a secluded life near Manchester until 1672, when the stipulations of the Five Mile Act 1665 were relaxed sufficiently by the Royal Declaration of Indulgence for him to obtain a license to preach from a meeting house built for that purpose with friends and situated at the corner of Deansgate and Mealhouse Lane in Bolton. Aside from the parish church, this was the only place of religion then in the town, and according to Hardman became "the spiritual home of many of the old mercantile families of the neighbourhood". Goodwin himself had close connections by marriage with many of the significant people of the town.

Goodwin died on 12 December 1685, aged 72, and was buried in the parish church. The congregation that he had founded went on to become that of Bank Street Unitarian Chapel.
