= William Blackmore (minister) =

William Blackmore (24 June 1616 – 1684) was an English ejected minister.

== Life ==
Blackmore was born on 24 June 1616, the second son of William Blackmore of London, a member of the Fishmongers' Company. His older brother, Sir John Blackmore, knight, was in the confidence of Oliver Cromwell, and became governor of St Helena after the Restoration. William was educated at Merchant Taylors' School and Lincoln College, Oxford. He graduated with his BA in 1638 and his MA in 1641, although he is not mentioned by Anthony Wood.

Having been ordained deacon he was appointed in December 1645 to the rectory of Pentlow, Essex, sequestered from Edward Alston. On 1 September 1646 his resignation of Pentloe was accepted by the Committee for Plundered Ministers, and he moved to London, and became curate to Thomas Coleman ('Rabbi' Coleman, who died March 1647) at St Peter's, Cornhill. He was ordained presbyter by the Fourth London Classis on 20 April 1647, but did not take the covenant, and was duly presented to the rectory of St Peter's by the corporation of London on 13 May 1656, after the death in 1655 of William Fairfax, D.D., sequestered in August 1643.

On 1 December 1646 the London presbyterians published a defence of their system, Jus Divinum Regiminis Ecclesiastici; or the Divine Right of Church Government of which Blackmore wrote the part relating to ordination. William Maxwell Hetherington (History of the Westminster Assembly p. 288) describes the book as 'the most complete and able defence of presbyterian church government that has yet appeared.' In 1648 Blackmore was one of the scribes to the London provincial assembly. He signed (probably on 20 January 1649) the presbyterian remonstrance to Oliver Cromwell on the meditated death of the king. He was one of the thirteen clergy arrested on a charge of complicity in Christopher Love's plot in 1651; having been freed through the influence of his brother Sir John, he rendered assistance to Love during his trial.

In 1662 Blackmore seceded with the nonconformists, and retired to Essex, where he lived on his ample means and gathered a small congregation. In April 1672 he was licensed as "a presbyterian teacher in his own house" in Hornchurch, near Romford. He died at Hare Street, a hamlet within a mile of Romford, in 1684, and was buried at Romford on 18 July.

== Family ==
He married (1) on 1 May 1660 Mary Chewning, from Leeds, Kent, who died in November 1678, and (2) before 1681, Sarah Luttrell, who survived him. His only son, Chewning Blackmore, born on 1 January 1663, was educated for the ministry at the Rev. John Woodhouse's academy, Sheriff Hales, near Shifnal, Shropshire, settled at Worcester in 1688 as assistant to Thomas Badland (ejected in 1663 from Willenhall, Staffordshire, and died 1689), and remained there till his death on 2 August 1737.

He married in 1694 Abigail (died in April 1734), daughter of Edward Higgins, and left two sons: (1) Francis, presbyterian minister at Evesham (1728–30), Coventry (1730–42), and Worcester (1743–61), and (2) Edward Chewning, presbyterian minister at Stoke, near Malvern.

His granddaughter Abigail Blackmore married Joseph Mottershead.
