= William V. Turner =

Alabama politician

William V. Turner was a state representative in Alabama during the Reconstruction era. He testified about intimidation and balloting issues in 1871. He represented Elmore County. He campaigned for U.S. Senator George E. Spencer and was accused of receiving patronage positions in exchange. He was a school teacher in Wetumpka and an organizer in the Union League.

He served as editor of the Elmore Republican.

== See also ==
- List of African-American officeholders during Reconstruction
