= Joseph Bretland =

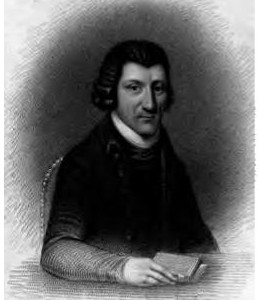
Joseph Bretland

Joseph Bretland (May 22, 1742 – July 8, 1819), was an English dissenting minister.

== Life ==
He was the son of Joseph Bretland, an Exeter tradesman, was born at Exeter 22 May 1742. He was for several years a day scholar at the Exeter grammar school, and was placed in business in 1757, but shortly after left it for the ministry. For this work he received a special education, his course of study being finished in 1766. From 1770 to 1772 he was minister of the Mint Chapel, and from the latter year until 1790 kept a classical school at Exeter. He resumed his duties at the Mint Chapel in 1789, and continued there until 1793. For three years, 1794-7, he acted as minister at the George's meeting-house in Exeter.

On the establishment in 1799 of an academy in the West of England for educating ministers among the Protestant dissenters, he was appointed one of its tutors in Mathematics. This position he retained down to its dissolution in 1805, and he then retired into private life.

In 1795 Bretland married Miss Sarah Moffatt.

He died at Exeter 8 July 1819. He is described as a believer in the unity of the Deity and in the simple humanity of Jesus Christ, and he is styled a scholar of 'extensive and solid learning.'

== Works ==
Many of his theological papers are in Joseph Priestley's Theological Repository and in the Monthly Repository. He composed sermons and prayers for the use of Unitarians, including a Liturgy for the Use of the Mint Meeting in Exeter, 1792. After his death there were printed at Exeter two volumes of Sermons by the late Rev. Joseph Bretland, to which are prefixed Memoirs of his Life, by Wm. Benjamin Kennaway, 1820. He was attached to Priestley, and edited a new edition of his The Rudiments of English Grammar; many of his letters are printed in J. T. Rutt's memoirs of Priestley.

His papers are held at Oxford University.
