= Cross Street Chapel =

Unitarian church in Manchester, England

Coordinates: 53.4817°N 2.2444°W

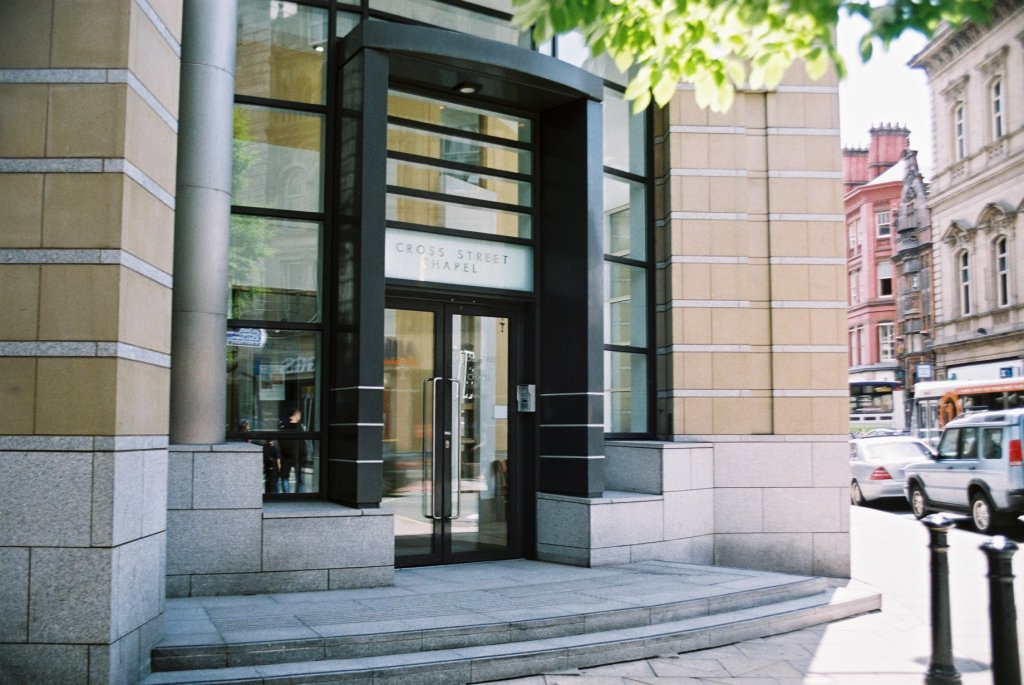
The modern Cross Street Chapel

Cross Street Chapel is a Unitarian church in central Manchester, England. It is a member of the General Assembly of Unitarian and Free Christian Churches, the umbrella organisation for British Unitarians.

== History ==
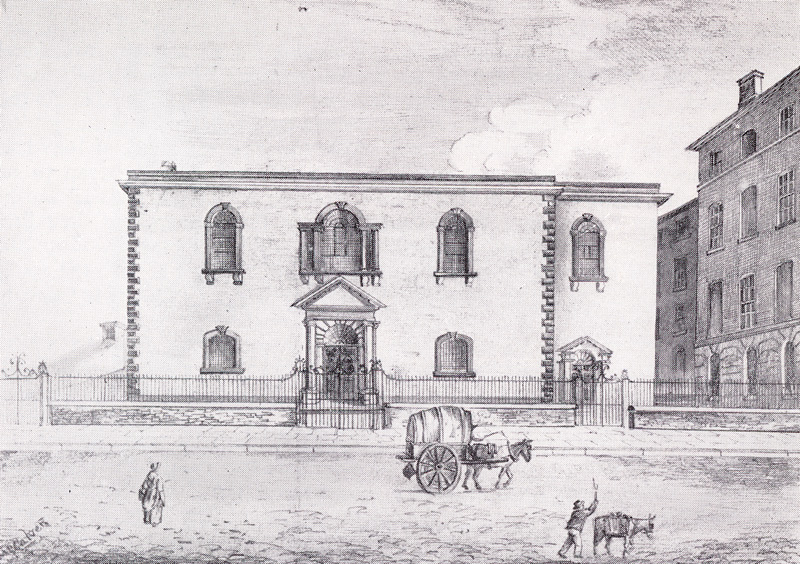
Cross Street Chapel c. 1835

The Act of Uniformity 1662 imposed state control on religion by regulating the style of worship in the Church of England. However, many clergy rejected the restrictions, and of the 2000 ministers who were ejected from the established church, Henry Newcome established his own congregation that same year.

In April 1693 a new meeting-house was proposed. Ground was bought on 20 June at Plungen's Meadow (now Cross Street); the building was begun on 18 July, a gallery was added as a private speculation by agreement dated 12 February 1694, and the meeting-house was opened by Newcome on 24 June 1694. The "Dissenters' Meeting House" holds a special place in the growth of nonconformism within the city.

It was wrecked by a Jacobite mob during the 1715 England riots on 10 June but it was rebuilt and enlarged. The building was renamed the Cross Street Chapel and became a Unitarian meeting-house c. 1761. It was destroyed during the Second World War Manchester Blitz in December 1940. A new building was constructed in 1959 and again in 1997.

In 2012, the chapel became the first place of worship to be granted a civil partnership licence when the law changed in England.

During the construction of Manchester Metrolink's second city crossing in the City Zone, 270 bodies from what used to be the chapel's graveyard had to be exhumed and reburied in Chorlton’s Southern Cemetery. The work took place from 2014 to 2017.

== The chapel ==
The present structure dates from 1997. The Gaskell Room of the new building houses a collection of memorabilia of novelist Elizabeth Gaskell.

== Notable ministry and congregation ==
Urban historian Harold L. Platt notes that in the Victorian period "The importance of membership in this Unitarian congregation cannot be overstated: as the fountainhead of Manchester Liberalism it exerted tremendous influence on the city and the nation for a generation."

Cross Street Chapel interior

- Sir Thomas Baker
- William Fairbairn
- Elizabeth Gaskell
- William Gaskell
- James Heywood
- Eaton Hodgkinson
- James Kay-Shuttleworth, 1st Baronet
- Henry Newcome
- Thomas Potter
- John Henry Reynolds
- Thomas Worthington

== List of ministers ==
- Henry Newcome 1662–1695
- John Chorlton 1687–1707
- James Coningham 1700–1712
- Eliezer Birch 1710–1717
- Joseph Mottershead 1717–1771
- Joshua Jones 1725–1740
- John Seddon 1741–1769
- Robert Gore 1770–1779
- Ralph Harrison 1771–1810
- Thomas Barnes 1780–1810
- John Grundy 1811–1824
- John Gooch Robberds 1811–1854
- John Hugh Worthington 1825–1827
- William Gaskell 1828–1884
- James Panton Ham 1855–1859
- James Drummond 1860–1869
- Samuel Alfred Steinthall 1870–1893
- Edwin Pinder Barrow 1893–1911
- Emanuel L.H. Thomas 1912–1917
- H. Harrold Johnson 1919–1928
- Charles W. Townsend 1929–1942
- F.H. Amphlett Micklewright 1943–1949
- Fred Kenworthy 1950–1955
- Reginald W. Wilde 1955–1959
- Charles H. Bartlett 1960–1967
- Kenneth B. Ridgway 1969–1971
- E.J. Raymond Cook 1972–1987
- Denise Boyd 1988–1996
- John A. Midgley 1997–2008
- Jane Barraclough 2008–2014
- Cody Coyne 2014–present
