= William Turner (biographer) =

English biographer and Unitarian minister (1788–1853)

William Turner (13 January 1788 – 30 December 1853) was an English Unitarian minister, known as a biographer.

== Life ==
Turner was born on 13 January 1788 in Newcastle, the son of Mary (1759–1797) and William Turner. He was educated at the University of Glasgow where he graduated with an MA in 1806, at Manchester College (then based in York), and at the University of Edinburgh (1808). From 1809 to 1827 he was tutor at Manchester College in mathematics and philosophy.

In February 1829 he became minister of Northgate End chapel, Halifax, where he was a promoter of educational and scientific culture. He died on 30 December 1853. He married (11 September 1817) Mercy Benton, niece of Newcome Cappe. No children.

== Works ==
He published sermons and tracts, including Remarks on the commonly received Doctrine of Atonement and Sacrifice (1830). His contributions to periodicals are sometimes signed V. N. [i.e. Vigilii Nepos]. His major work is Lives of Eminent Unitarians, 1840–43, 2 vols.
