= Charles Baker (instructor) =

British instructor for the deaf (1803–1874)

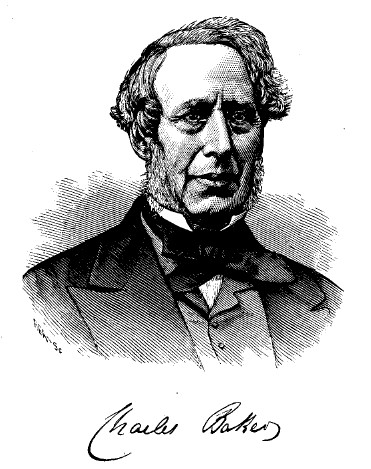
Charles Baker, educator of the deaf

Charles Baker (1803–1874), was an English instructor of the deaf notable for writing some of the earliest school text books suited to deaf children.

== Biography ==
Baker was the second son of Thomas Baker, of Birmingham, and was born 31 July 1803. His sister Harriet (1805–1850) was the mother of Edward White Benson, archbishop of Canterbury. While a youth he was for a short time an assistant at the Deaf and Dumb Institution at Edgbaston, near Birmingham. He then tried other employment, but his services were again sought by the committee of the institution, when in a difficulty on the failure of their Swiss-born master to control the pupils. Charles Baker had never contemplated teaching as a profession, but without much thought for the future he entered upon his work. He at once obtained the affections of the children, and, to their delight, he remained at the institution. Three years afterwards he was invited to aid in the establishment at Doncaster of a Deaf and Dumb Institution for the county of York. The plan had originated with the Rev. William Fenton, in company with whom he visited all the large towns of the county, and obtained such support as justified the carrying out of the scheme.

The deficiency of class-books was an evil which Baker soon found to be pressing. Although the deaf and dumb had been gathered together in various institutions for forty years, no attempt had been made to provide such a course as they required. This want he set himself to supply. He wrote the Circle of Knowledge in its various gradations, consecutive lessons, picture lessons, teachers' lessons, the Book of the Bible in its several gradations, and many other works which had special relation to the teaching of the deaf and dumb. The Circle of Knowledge obtained great popularity. It was used in the education of the royal children, and of the grandchildren of Louis-Philippe. It was largely used throughout the British Empire and in Russia, and the first gradation has been translated into Chinese, and is used in the schools of China and Japan. Many years ago the publisher reported that 400,000 copies had been sold. Baker also wrote for the Penny Cyclopædia various topographical articles, and those on the Instruction of the Blind, Dactylology, Deaf and Dumb, George Dalgamo, and the Abbé Sicard. He contributed to the Journal of Education, to the Polytechnic Journal, and the publications of the Central Society of Education, and translated Ammann's Dissertation on Speech (1873).

He was an active worker in connection with the local institutions of Doncaster, and was a member of the committee for the establishment of a public free library for the town. He was held in high regard by teachers of the deaf and dumb in England and in America, and in June 1870 the Columbian Institution of the Deaf and Dumb conferred on him the degree of doctor of philosophy, an honour which he appreciated, but he never assumed the title. He died at Doncaster 27 May 1874, and his old pupils erected a mural tablet to his memory in the institution where he had laboured so long.

== Published works ==
- British Butterflies, Birmingham, 1828.
- Articles in the Penny Cyclopaedia:

Barnsby, Bawtry, Beverley, Bonet, Boroughbridge, Boston, Bradford, Bridlington, Braidwood, Bulwer, Hull, Dactylology, Deaf and Dumb, Dalgarno, Dewsbury, Doncaster, Halifax, Huddersfield, Leeds, Pontefract, Richmond, Ripon, Sicard

- In the Central Society of Education:
- On the Education of the Senses, (first publication,) 1837.
- Mechanics’ Institutions and Libraries, 1837.
- Infant Schools, (third publication,) 1838.
- In the Journal of Education:
- Account of the Yorkshire Institution for the Deaf and Dumb.
- On Teaching Reading.
- On the Elements of Arithmetic.
- In the Polytechnic Journal :
- On the Art of Printing for the Blind.
- In Knight's Gallery of Portraits:
- The Abee de l'Epee
- Contributions to publications of the Society for the Diffusion of Useful Knowledge and the Central Society of Education :
- Account of the Yorkshire Institution for the Deaf and Dumb.
- On the Education of the Blind.
- On the Education of the Deaf and Dumb.
- On the Art of Printing for the Blind.
- On Dactylology.
- On Attempted Cures of Deafness.
- On Teaching Reading.
- On the Elements of Arithmetic.
- On the Education of the Senses.
- On Infant Schools.
- On Mechanics' Institutions and Libraries.
- The Abbe de l'Epee.
- The Abbe Sicard.
- John Paul Bonet.
- John Bulwer.
- George Dalgarno.
- Thomas Braidwood.
- School Text Books:
- Picture Lessons for Boys and Girls.
- Circle of Knowledge, Gradation I.
- Circle of Knowledge, Gradation II.
- Circle of Knowledge, Gradation III.
- Manual to Circle of Knowledge, Gradation I
- Manual to Circle of Knowledge, Gradation II
- Teacher's Handbook to Circle of Knowledge, Gradation III
- Teacher's Handbook to Circle of Knowledge, Gradation III, with footnotes.
- Consecutive Lessons, I - Man, his frame and wants.
- Consecutive Lessons II - Animals, their nature and uses.
- Consecutive Lessons III - Plants, the earth and minerals.
- Consecutive Lessons IV - Cosmography, National and Social Life
- Teachers' Lessons :
- 1. Primary Lessons.
- 2. A Teacher's First Lessons on Natural Religion.
- 3. A Teacher's Lessons on Dr. Watts's first set of Catechisms.
- 4. A Teacher's Lessons on Revealed Religion.
- 5. A Teacher's Lessons on Creation.
- 6. A Teacher's Lessons on Scripture Characters.
- Religious Text Books:
- The Book of Bible History, Gradation I.
- The Book of Bible History, Gradation II.
- The Book of Bible History, Gradation III.
- Manual of the Book of Bible History, Gradation I.
- Manual of the Book of Bible History, Gradation II.
- Manual of the Book of Bible History, Gradation III.
- Catechetical Exercises on Bible History.
- The Book of Bible Geography.
- The Bible Class-book.
- The Book of Bible Events of the Old and New Testaments.
- The Book of Bible Characters of the Old and New Testaments.
- A Chart of Bible Chronology.
- Fifty-six Tablet Lessons, in sheets.
- Question-Book to the Tablet Lessons.
- The Child's Preparatory Lessons on Scripture History.
- The Child's Book of Scripture History.
- A Tabular View of the Old Testament.
- The " Tabular View " for Students and Families.
- Exercises on Tabular View for Students and Families.
- Class Lessons on Tabular View for Students and Families.
- A Tabular Chart of the Gospels and the Acts.
- Reading Without Spelling.
- Reading and Catechising :
- 1. Natural and Revealed Religion.
- 2. The Creation.
- 3. Scripture Characters.
- Other Writings:
- Common Things. A letter to Lord Ashburton. 1854.
- Articulation for the Deaf and Dumb. 1872
- A Translation of "A Dissertation on Speech, by John Conrad Amman, M. D." 1873.

== Works online ==
- Animals, Their Nature and Uses Vol II of the Series of Consecutive Lessons (text)
- Plants, The Earth and Minerals Vol III of the Series of Consecutive Lessons (text)
- Plants, The Earth and Minerals Google Books (PDF)

== See also ==
- Richard Aslatt Pearce
