= Samuel Bourn the Elder =

English dissenting minister

Samuel Bourn the Elder (1648–1719) was an English dissenting minister, based mainly in Bolton.

His maternal uncle was Reverend Robert Seddon, who received Presbyterian ordination on 14 June 1654 and became minister at Gorton, Lancashire and Langley, Derbyshire. Seddon was silenced after the Act of Uniformity 1662. Seddon sent Bourn to Emmanuel College, Cambridge, which he left in 1672. His tutor was Samuel Richardson, who taught that there is no distinction between grace and moral righteousness and salvation is dependent upon the moral state. It does not appear that Bourn accepted this view; his theology was always Calvinistic and, although he regretted deflectors from that system, he was no hunter of heretics.

== Life ==
Bourn was born at Derby, where his father and grandfather (who were clothiers) had provided the town with a water supply. Leaving Cambridge without a degree, he taught in a school at Derby and then became chaplain to Lady Hatton. Living with a paternal aunt in London, he was ordained there. In 1679 Samuel Annesley's influence gained him the pastoral charge of the Presbyterian congregation at Calne, Wiltshire (which he held for 16 years, declining overtures from Bath, Durham and Lincoln. On his deathbed in 1695, Seddon (who had preached at Bolton, Lancashire since 1688) recommended Bourn as his successor there.

Bourn went to Bolton in 1695; although at first he was not well received by the congregation at Bank Street Unitarian Chapel, he declined the offer by his Calne congregation and gradually won the affection of his Bolton flock. For him, a new meeting-house (licensed on 30 September 1696) was built on ground donated by his uncle. He originated (and ultimately supported) a charity school for 20 poor children. His stipend was very meagre although, when pleading for donations for others, he was known as "the best beggar in Bolton". In his will he left £20 as an endowment to the Monday lecture.

His health declined some time before his death on 4 March 1719. On his deathbed, in answer to his friend Jeremiah Aldred (d. 1729, minister of Manton) he emphatically expressed his satisfaction with the nonconformist position he had adopted. His funeral sermon was preached (from 2 Kings 3) by his son Samuel.

== Family ==
Bourn married the daughter of George Scortwreth (who was ejected from St. Peter's in Lincoln), and had seven children. His eldest son, Joseph, died on 17 June 1701 at age 20; his youngest sons, Daniel and Abraham, died in infancy in April 1701. His widow survived him by several years.

His second son Samuel was also a dissenting minister, based mainly in Wigan and Birmingham.

== Works ==
Although Bourn himself was unpublished, his son Samuel published his sermons. These were entitled Several Sermons preached by the late Rev. Mr. Samuel Bourn of Bolton, Lancashire, (1722) (two sets of sermons from 1 John 3:2–3:3 on "The transforming vision of Christ in the future state"), adding the funeral sermon and a brief memoir by William Tong and dedicating the volume to a relative (Madam Hacker of Duffield). He speaks of his father as a great preacher, a good pastor, a good scholar, and an honest, upright man. A portrait prefixed to the volume shows a strong countenance; Bourn wears gown and bands, and his flowing hair is confined by a skullcap.
