= John Taylor (dissenting preacher) =

English preacher and theologian

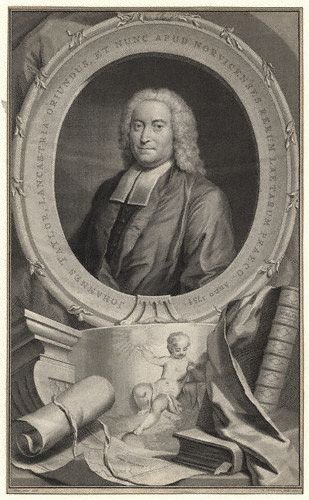
John Taylor, 1745 engraving by John Theodore Heins

John Taylor (1694–1761) was an English dissenting preacher, Hebrew scholar, and theologian.

== Early life ==
The son of a timber merchant at Lancaster, he was born at Scotforth, Lancashire. His father, John was an Anglican, his mother, Susannah a dissenter. Taylor began his education for the dissenting ministry in 1709 under Thomas Dixon at Whitehaven, where he drew up for himself a Hebrew grammar (1712). From Whitehaven he went to study under the tutor Thomas Hill, son of the ejected minister Thomas Hill, near Derby. Leaving Hill on 25 March 1715, he took charge on 7 April of an extra-parochial chapel at Kirkstead, Lincolnshire, then used for nonconformist worship by the Disney family. He was ordained (11 April 1716) by dissenting ministers in Derbyshire. In 1726 he declined a call to Pudsey, Yorkshire.

== In Norwich ==
In 1733 he moved to Norwich, as colleague to Peter Finch, son of Henry Finch.

So far Taylor had not deviated from dissenting orthodoxy, though hesitating about subscription. According to a family tradition, given by William Turner, on settling at Norwich he went through Samuel Clarke's Scripture Doctrine of the Trinity (1712) with his congregation, adopted its view, and came forward (1737) in defence of a dissenting layman excommunicated for heterodoxy on this topic by James Sloss (1698–1772) of Nottingham, a pupil of John Simson. On 25 February 1754 Taylor laid the first stone of the Octagon Chapel, Norwich, opened 12 May 1756, and described by John Wesley (23 December 1757) as 'perhaps the most elegant one in all Europe,' and too fine for 'the old coarse gospel.' In his opening sermon, Taylor, who had received (6 April) the diploma (dated 20 January) of D.D. from the University of Glasgow, disowned all names such as Presbyterian and the like, claiming that of Christian only; a claim attacked by a local critic, probably Grantham Killingworth, writing as a Quaker, under the name of 'M. Adamson'.

== Warrington Academy tutor ==
Around the end of 1757 Taylor returned to Lancashire as divinity tutor (including moral philosophy) in Warrington Academy, opened 20 October 1757. The appointment was a tribute to his reputation, but at the age of sixty-three the change turned out unhappily for him. He had troubles in class teaching, on doctrinal matters with John Seddon, and was convinced that he was denied due deference. Rheumatism settled in his knees, and he could not walk without crutches. Rousing his powers, he wrote, but did not live to publish, a fervent tract on prayer.

== Death ==
Taylor died in his sleep on 5 March 1761, and was buried in the chapel-yard at Chowbent, Lancashire. His funeral sermon was preached by Edward Harwood. A tablet to his memory is in Chowbent Chapel; another in the Octagon Chapel, Norwich, bearing a Latin inscription by Samuel Parr.

== Works and views ==
=== Scholar ===
His classical knowledge, according to Edward Harwood, was 'almost unrivalled', but Samuel Parr found fault with his latinity. His Hebrew Concordance of 1754–57 was both a concordance (based on earlier works) and a lexicon of Hebrew, and was his unaided work. In 1751 he issued proposals for its publication, after more than thirteen years' work. The subscription list to the first volume (1754) contains the names of twenty-two English and fifteen Irish bishops, and the work is dedicated to the hierarchy. Based on Johann Buxtorf the Elder and Noldius (Christian Nolde), the concordance is arranged to serve the purposes of a Hebrew-English and English-Hebrew lexicon, and also attempt to fix the primitive meaning of Hebrew roots.

=== Theologian ===
In 1757 Wesley described Taylor's views as 'old deism in a new dress'. Job Orton remarked (1778) said 'he had to the last a great deal of the puritan in him.' Orton's earlier guess (1771), adopted by Walter Wilson, that Taylor had become a Socinian, is dismissed as groundless by Alexander Gordon in the Dictionary of National Biography.

Gordon in his Dictionary of National Biography article also wrote that the ethical core interested Taylor more than speculative theology. His work on original sin (Scripture Doctrine of Original Sin, 1740, written 1735) was against the Calvinistic view of human nature, and was influential: witnessed in Scotland by Robert Burns (Epistle to John Goudie), and in New England, according to Jonathan Edwards. It was answered first by David Jennings in A Vindication of the Scripture Doctrine of Original Sin (anonymous, 1740). Isaac Watts replied to Taylor in The Ruin and Recovery of Man (1740). James Hervey's Theron and Aspasio is partly aimed at Taylor, if not explicitly. John Wesley's Doctrine of Original Sin (1757) is a detailed answer to Taylor, drawing on Jennings, Hervey and Watts. Scripture Doctrine of Original Sin laid a basis for the later Unitarian movement and the American Congregationalists.

His study of Pauline theology, partly on the lines of John Locke, produced (1745) a 'Key' to the apostolic writings with an application of this 'Key' to the interpretation of the Epistle to the Romans. Here, rather than in his treatise on the topic (1751), his view of atonement is clearly defined.

== Works ==
Taylor published, besides single sermons and tracts:

- A Narrative of Mr. Joseph Rawson's Case ... with a Prefatory Discourse in Defence of the Common Rights of Christians, 1737, anon.; the Narrative is by Rawson; Sloss replied in A True Narrative, 1737); 2nd edit. with author's name, 1742.
- A Further Defence of the Common Rights, 1738; 2nd edit. 1742; reprinted, 1829.
- The Scripture Doctrine of Original Sin, 1740 (three parts); 2nd edit. 1741. A Supplement, 1741, (reply to David Jennings)
- Remarks on such additions to the second Edition of the Ruin and Recovery of the Arguments Advanced in the Supplement to the Scripture Doctrine of Original Sin,' London: printed and sold by M. Fenner at Turk's Head, Gracechurch Street, 1742, (reply to Isaac Watts) [copy in Dr William's Library], all included in 3rd edit. Belfast, 1746; 4th edit. 1767, (with reply to Wesley).
- A Paraphrase with Notes on the Epistle to the Romans ... Prefix'd, A Key to the Apostolic Writings, 1745; Dublin, 1746.
- A Scripture Catechism, 1745.
- A Collection of Tunes in Various Airs, 1750.
- The Scripture Doctrine of Atonement, 1751.
- The Hebrew Concordance adapted to the English Bible ... after ... Buxtorf, 1754–7, 2 vols.
- The Lord's Supper Explained, 1754, 1756.
- The Covenant of Grace and Baptism the token of it, explained upon scripture principles, John Taylor, D.D. of Norwich 1755; Printed for J Waugh, at the Turk's Head, in Lombard Street, and M Fenner, at the Angel and Bible in Paternoster Row. [1757 copy in Dr Williams Library].
- An Examination of the Scheme of Morality advanced by Dr. Hutcheson, 1759.
- A Sketch of Moral Philosophy, 1760.

Posthumous works were:

- The Scripture Account of Prayer,’ 1761; the 2nd edit. 1762, has appended Remarks on the liturgy edited by Seddon.
- A Scheme of Scripture Divinity, 1763; part was printed (1760?) for class use; reprinted, with the Key, in Bishop Watson's Collection of Theological Tracts, 1785, vols. i. and iii.

He left in manuscript a paraphrase on Ephesians, and four volumes of an unfinished abridgment (1721–22) of Matthew Henry's Exposition of the Old Testament, of which specimens are given in the Universal Theological Magazine, December 1804, pp. 314 sq. A selection from his works was published with title, The Principles and Pursuits of an English Presbyterian, 1843.

== Family ==
He married (13 August 1717) Elizabeth Jenkinson (died 2 June 1761), a widow, of Boston, Lincolnshire. His surviving children were:

- Richard (died 1762), married Margaret Meadows; his eldest son, Philip Taylor (1747–1831), was presbyterian minister at Kay Street, Liverpool (1767), and at Eustace Street, Dublin (1771), and grandfather of Meadows Taylor. Richard's second son, John Taylor, was a hymn-writer.
- Sarah (died 1773), married to John Rigby of Chowbent, was mother of Edward Rigby.
