= Bache =

== Places ==
- Bache, Cheshire
- Bache Peninsula, on Ellesmere Island, Canada

== People ==
- Richard Bache (1737–1811), an American Postmaster General
- Sarah Franklin Bache (1743–1808), his wife and Benjamin Franklin's daughter
  - Benjamin Franklin Bache (journalist) (1769–1798), an American journalist, Richard and Sarah's son
    - Franklin Bache (1792-1864), American physician, chemist, professor and writer
  - Benjamin Franklin Bache (surgeon) (1801–1881), U.S. Navy surgeon, Richard Bache's grandson
  - Alexander Dallas Bache (1806–1867), an American physicist, Richard Bache's grandson
  - George M. Bache (1840–1896), an American naval officer, Richard Bache's grandson
- Samuel Bache (1804–1876), an English Unitarian Minister
  - Francis Edward Bache (1833–1858), an English composer, Samuel Bache's son
  - Walter Bache (1842–1888), an English pianist and conductor, champion of Franz Liszt, Samuel Bache's son
  - Constance Bache (1846–1903), an English pianist and author, biographer of her brothers, Samuel Bache's daughter
- Jules Bache (1861–1944), an American banker and philanthropist who built the company Bache & Co.
  - Kathryn Bache Miller (1896–1979), an American art collector and philanthropist, his daughter
- Harold Bache (1889–1916), an English footballer (West Bromwich Albion) and cricketer
- Joseph Bache (1880–1960), an English footballer (Aston Villa and England national football team)
  - David Bache (1925–1994), an English car designer, Joseph Bache's son
- Alice K. Bache (1903–1977), an American philanthropist and art collector
- Emma Bache (born 1963), English graphologist
- Ida Wolden Bache (born 1973), Norwegian economist

== Other ==
- Bache & Co., a division of Prudential Financial
- USS Bache, an American warship
- Share taxi, or bâché, in Francophone West Africa
- Bach (New Zealand), a variant spelling of a local name for a holiday cottage
- Che language and people, also known as Rukuba. (Nigeria)

== See also ==
- Bach (surname)
