= Constance Bache =

English musician, translator, and biographer

Constance Bache (/ˈbeɪtʃ/; 11 March 1846 – 28/30 June 1903) was an English composer, pianist, teacher, translator, and biographer.

== Early life and education ==
Constance Bache was born at Fairview House, Hagley Road, Edgbaston, 11 March 1846. She was the daughter of Samuel Bache (1804–1876), a Unitarian minister at the Church of the Messiah, Birmingham. She was the sister of Francis Edward Bache and Walter Bache; an uncle on her mother's side was James Martineau. In addition to studying under her brother Walter, and with James Stimpson, of Birmingham, she studied at the Munich Conservatorium and subsequently under Karl Klindworth and Frits Hartvigson.

== Career ==
After an injury to her right hand, Bache gave up public performance excepting occasional Birmingham concerts. In 1883, she moved to London, where she took up teaching and literary musical work. Bache was very successful as a translator from German into English. Among her achievements, mention is made of the librettos of Franz Liszt's 'St. Elizabeth,' Wolfgang Amadeus Mozart's 'Bastian and Bastienne,' Engelbert Humperdinck's ' Hansel und Gretel,' Robert Schumann's 'The Rose's Pilgrimage,' and Scenes from Johann Wolfgang von Goethe's ' Faust', as well as Liszt's 'Letters'; Heintz's analyses of Richard Wagner's works; Johann Christian Lobe's' Catechism of Music'; Hans von Bülow's annotations of Cramer, Frédéric Chopin. She wrote a biography of her two brothers, Brother Musicians: Reminiscences of Edward and Walter Bache, which was published in 1901.

She lectured on "Modern Russian composers", and one of the last acts of her busy life was to write an "appreciation" of her old friend, Alfred James Hipkins, in the columns of the July issue of the Monthly Musical Record. After being ill for five days, she died at Montreux, on 28 June 1903, (Note: Who Was Who 1897-1916 gives Bache's date of death as June 30; the Musical Times obituary gives June 28.) age 57.
