= Frits Hartvigson =

Danish pianist (1841-1919)

Frits Hartvigson (sometimes Fritz) (31 May 1841 – 8 March 1919) was a Danish pianist and teacher, who spent many years in England and gave a number of important English concerto premieres.

== Career ==
Frits Seligmann Hartvigson was born in Grenå, Jutland in 1841. His first lessons were with his mother. He later studied under Niels Gade, Gebauer and Anton Rée in Copenhagen. He made his debut at age 14, and by 17 he was touring throughout Norway. He had further study in Berlin under Hans von Bülow in 1859–62. Bülow recommended he study under his then father-in-law Franz Liszt, but this did not occur. He did, however, meet Liszt, and it was apparently to Hartvigson that Liszt remarked that Charles-Valentin Alkan "possessed the finest technique he had ever known, but preferred the life of a recluse".

Among Hartvigson's concert successes at that time were Anton Rubinstein's Piano Concerto No. 3 in G in Leipzig in 1861, and Robert Schumann's Piano Concerto in A minor in Copenhagen under Gade's baton in 1863.

He settled in England in 1864. He was a frequent performer at the Crystal Palace Saturday concerts, at the Hans Richter and George Henschel orchestral concerts, and at the Royal Philharmonic Society concerts. At the Crystal Palace on 6 October 1866 he played for the first time in England Liszt's arrangement for piano and orchestra of Schubert's Wanderer Fantasy. On 23 May 1867, he and Walter Bache gave the first performance in England of Liszt's symphonic poem Die Ideale, in an arrangement for two pianos.

In 1867-68 he was a member of the ironically named "Working Men's Society" (none of them were from the working class), a private group promoting progressive repertoire in London. It was confined to six members; four pianists with Lisztian or Wagnerian credentials: Karl Klindworth, Walter Bache, Edward Dannreuther and Frits Hartvigson; and two lay members, the painter Wilhelm Kümpel and the writer and authority on old musical instruments Alfred J. Hipkins (1826-1903). They met in each other's homes up to 30 times a year, the pianist members always playing in the above order.

On 10 June 1872 he played Liszt's Piano Concerto No. 1 in E-flat for the first time in England. On 16 November he introduced Rubinstein's 4th Concerto in D minor.

From 1873 to 1875 he lived in Saint Petersburg, Russia. He also appeared in Moscow, Finland, Munich and Copenhagen once more. On return to England he became pianist to Alexandra, Princess of Wales (the future Queen Alexandra). He taught for many years at the Royal Normal College for the Blind at Upper Norwood.

He was the soloist in the English premiere of Hans von Bronsart's Piano Concerto in F-sharp minor on 30 September 1876. On 17 March 1877 under the baton of Sir August Manns he performed Tchaikovsky's Piano Concerto No. 1 in B-flat minor at St James's Hall in London, for the first time in its revised version. Tchaikovsky held Hartvigsen in high esteem, later writing to him:

- I have always been a great admirer of yours; I love immeasurably your playing, which is full of strength, brilliance, energy, and at the same time poetry. O, how I regret that I was unable to attend the concert at the St James' Hall! With what immense pleasure I would have listened to my composition played by you and accompanied by such an excellent orchestra as that of Manns!

However, on at least one occasion Tchaikovsky confused Hartvigson with Edward Dannreuther.

On 19 November 1878 Hartvigson was the soloist in the first English performance of Liszt's Totentanz. The conductor was Hans von Bülow and the orchestra included many advanced students of the Royal Normal College for the Blind and their professors.

In 1879 he injured his left hand, which prevented his public appearances for some years.

In 1888 he was appointed Professor at the Royal Academy of Music in London, becoming an Honorary Member in 1894. In 1895 the Danish King appointed him a Knight of the Order of the Dannebrog. From 1905 to 1911 he taught at the Royal College of Music. On retirement he returned to Denmark, and died in Copenhagen in 1919.

His prominent pupils included William Murdoch, Alfred Hollins, Constance Bache and Pauline Ellice and George Thalben-Ball.

His brother Anton Hartvigson (1845-1911) was also a prominent pianist and teacher, also at the Normal College for the Blind for some time, but was based mainly in Copenhagen.
