= John Jones (Unitarian) =

Welsh Unitarian minister, critic, tutor and lexicographer

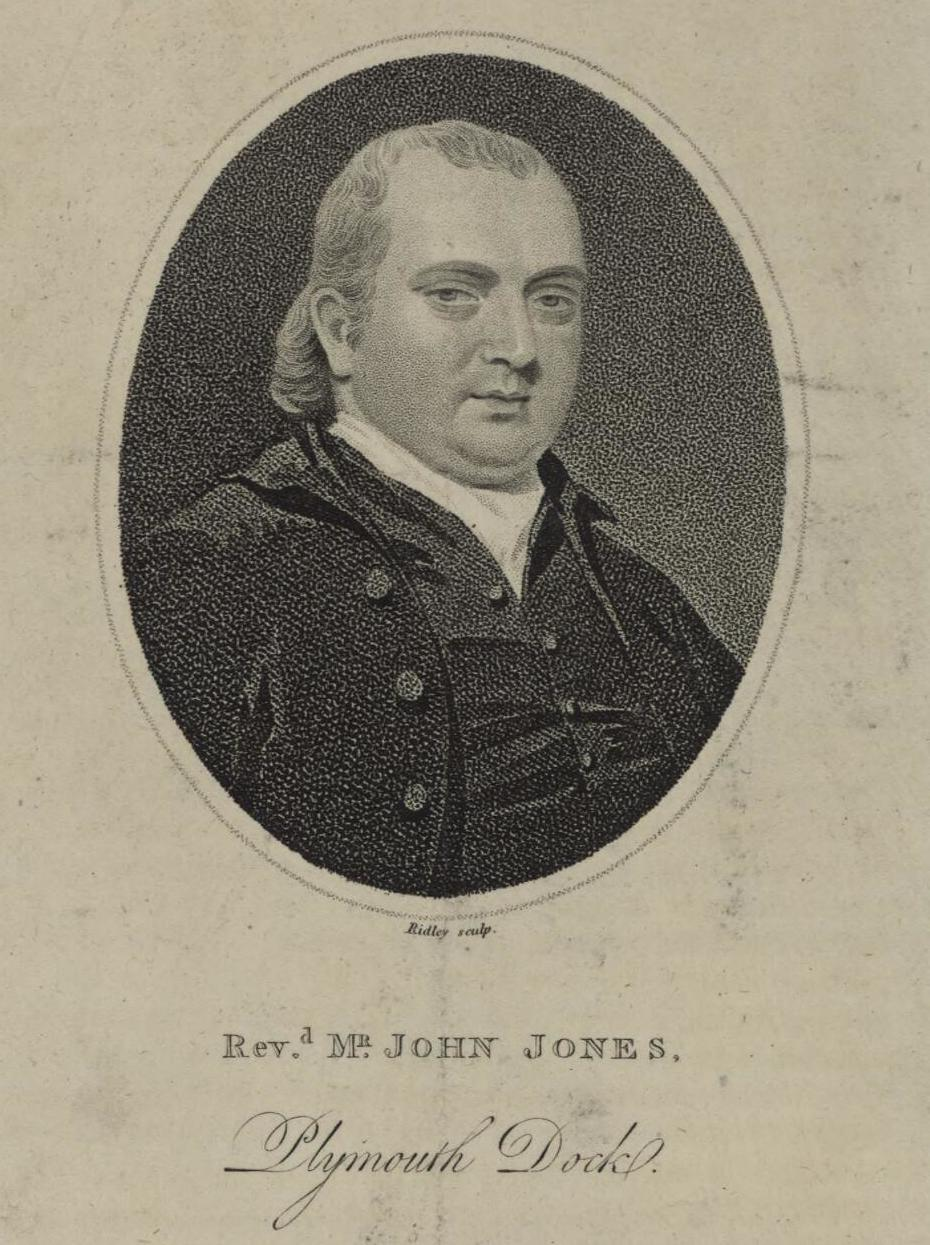
Portrait of Mr. John Jones from a 1799 engraving

John Jones LL.D. (1766? – 10 January 1827) was a Welsh Unitarian minister, critic, tutor and lexicographer.

== Life ==
He was born about 1766 near Llandovery, in the parish of Llandingat, Carmarthenshire. His father was a farmer. In 1780, at age 14 or 15, he started study at the ‘college of the church of Christ,’ Brecon, under William Griffiths, and remained there till 1783, when his father's death called him home. Soon after the establishment in 1786 of the New College, Hackney near London, he was admitted as a divinity student on the recommendation of his relative, David Jones, who was already a student there. He was a favourite pupil of Gilbert Wakefield, classical tutor.

In 1792, he succeeded David Peter as assistant-tutor in the Welsh presbyterian college, then in Swansea, Glamorganshire. With William Howell, the principal tutor, an old-fashioned Arian, Jones, who was of the Priestley and combative, had serious differences. In 1795 the presbyterian board removed both tutors, and transferred the college to Carmarthen. Jones then in 1795 succeeded John Kentish as minister of the presbyterian congregation at Plymouth, Devon, where he remained till 1798. He then established a school at Halifax, Yorkshire. From 29 March 1802 to 1804 he was minister of Northgate End Chapel, Halifax, carrying on a school at the same time.

In 1804 he settled in London as a tutor in classics, where his pupils included the sons of Sir Samuel Romilly. He after a time abandoned preaching altogether. He was a member (before 1814) of the Philological Society of Manchester; received (1818) the degree of LL.D. from Aberdeen University; was elected (1821) a trustee of Dr. Daniel Williams's foundations, and (about 1825) a member of the Royal Society of Literature.

He died at Great Coram Street on 10 January 1827, and was interred in the burying-ground of St. George's, Bloomsbury, where his gravestone bore a Latin inscription.

== Works ==
As a Greek-English lexicographer Jones did work which earned the commendation of Samuel Parr. He discarded accents. Instances of alleged theological bias in his interpretations were sharply commented on in the second number of the Westminster Review (April 1824) by John Walker the separatist; Jones fiercely defended himself. He defended the integrity of the passages in Josephus referring to Christ, and maintained that both Josephus and Philo were Christians. The initial chapters of St. Matthew and St. Luke he rejected as interpolations, but he held the Comma Johanneum to be authentic, and to have been excised at an early date because it taught Unitarian doctrine.

He published:

- A Development of … Events, calculated to restore the Christian Religion to its … Purity, &c., Leeds, 1800, 2 vols.
- The Epistle … to the Romans analysed, &c., Halifax, 1801.
- Illustrations of the Four Gospels, &c., 1808.
- A Grammar of the Greek Tongue, &c., 1808; 4th edit., with title, ‘Etymologia Græca,’ 1826.
- A Grammar of the Latin Tongue. &c., 1810; reprinted 1813, 1816.
- A Latin and English Vocabulary, 1812; enlarged, with title, Analogiæ Latinæ, 1825.
- Ecclesiastical Researches, or Philo and Josephus proved to be … Apologists of Christ, &c., 1812. And its ‘Sequel’, 1813.
- A New Version of the first three Chapters of Genesis, &c., 1819, (under the pseudonym of Essenus).
- A Series of … Facts, demonstrating the Truth of the Christian Religion, &c., 1820. And An Answer to a Pseudocriticism of this work, 1824.
- A Greek and English Lexicon, &c., 1823.
- A Reply to … “A New Trial of the Witnesses,” &c., and … “Not Paul but Jesus,” &c., 1824, (under the pseudonym of Ben David).
- The Principles of Lexicography, &c., 1824.
- Three Letters, in which is demonstrated the Genuineness of … 1 John v. 7, &c., 1825, (under the pseudonym of Ben David).
- The Tyro's Greek and English Lexicon, &c.; 2nd edit. 1825.
- An Exposure of the Hamiltonian System of Teaching, &c., 1826. Against the Hamiltonian language teaching system.
- An Explanation of the Greek Article, &c., 1827. (against Middleton).

Posthumous was: The Book of the Prophet Isaiah translated, &c., 1830. He edited an edition of John Entick's Latin Dictionary, 1824, and contributed largely to periodicals, especially the Monthly Repository.

== Family ==
He married first, soon after 1804, the only daughter of Abraham Rees, who had been his tutor at Hackney. His first wife died without issue in 1815, and Jones married secondly, in 1817, Anna, only daughter of George Dyer of Sawbridgeworth, Hertfordshire, who, with two children, survived him. His literary executor was his nephew, James Chervet of Croydon.
