= Broad Street Presbyterian Church =

Broad Street Presbyterian Church may refer to:

- Broad Street Presbyterian Church, Birmingham in England
- East Broad Street Presbyterian Church in Columbus, Ohio, United States
- Old Broad Street Presbyterian Church and Cemetery in Bridgeton, New Jersey, United States
