= William Morgan (actuary) =

British scientist and actuary (1750–1833)

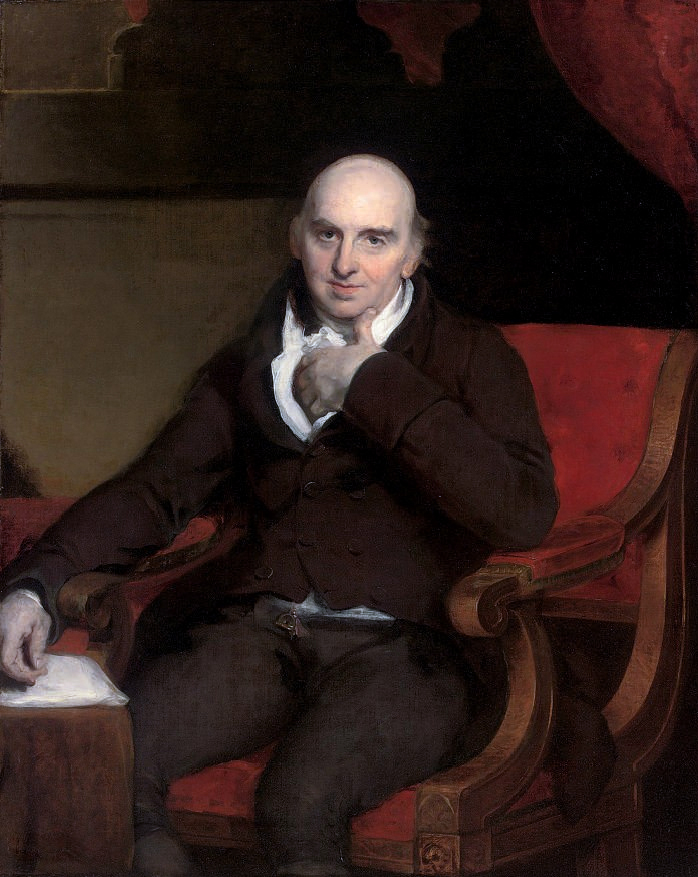
Portrait of Morgan by Sir Thomas Lawrence

William Morgan, FRS (26 May (O.S.) 1750 – 4 May 1833) was a British physician, physicist and statistician, who is considered the father of modern actuarial science. He is also credited with being the first to record the "invisible light" produced when a current is passed through a partly evacuated glass tube: "the first x-ray tube".

== Life ==
He was born in Bridgend, Glamorgan, Wales, son to physician William Morgan and Sarah (sister of Richard Price). William's brother was George Cadogan Morgan. At eighteen he received medical training at Guy's Hospital, London, working also as an apothecary to pay his way. He did not complete his training, but after one year returned to Bridgend to join his father's practice. He was not popular with his father's patients: they thought him inexperienced and they resented receiving treatment from someone with a deformity—Morgan suffered from a club foot. After his father's death he left medicine and in 1774, on the recommendation of his mother's brother, the renowned Richard Price, he was appointed Assistant Actuary of the Equitable Life Assurance Society. In February 1775, after the death of John Pocock, he was elected Actuary. By the time he retired on 2 December 1830, 56 years later at the age of 80, he had laid the foundations of the actuarial profession —in fact the term "actuarial" became attached to the profession because of his title.

He won the Copley Medal in 1789, for his two papers on the values of Reversions and Survivorships, printed in the last two volumes of the Philosophical Transactions of the Royal Society, in the field of actuarial science:

- "On the Probabilities of Survivorships Between Two Persons of Any Given Ages, and the Method of Determining the Values of Reversions Depending on those Survivorships", 1788–1794
- "On the Method of Determining, from the Real Probabilities of Life, the Value of a Contingent Reversion in Which Three Lives are Involved in the Survivorship". Philosophical Transactions of the Royal Society of London, vol. 79 (1789) pp. 40–54

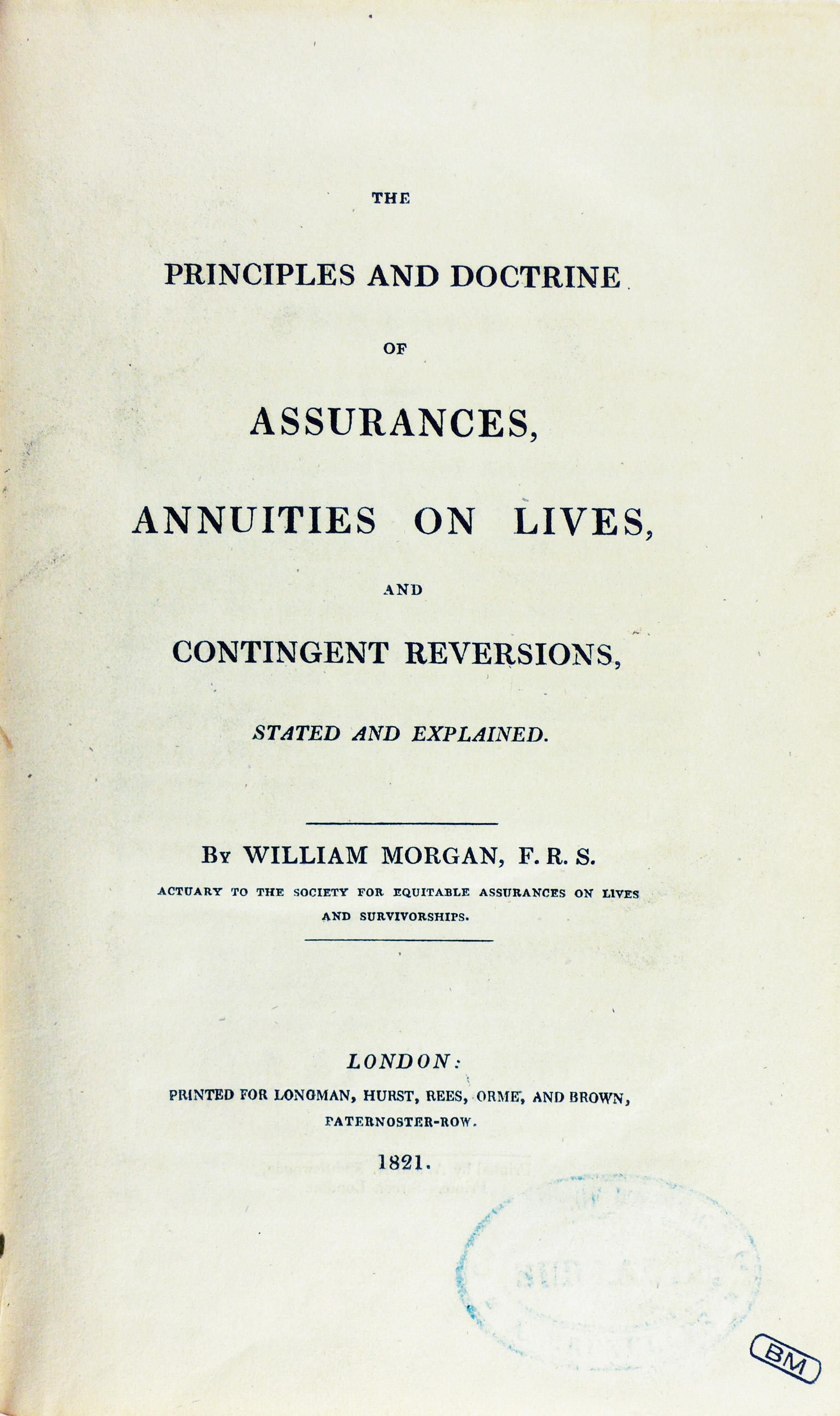
The principles and doctrine of assurance, 1821

He was elected a Fellow of the Society, in May of the following year.

Advised by Joseph Priestley, a family friend, he developed an interest in scientific experimentation and is credited with being the first to record the "invisible light" produced when a current is passed through a partly evacuated glass tube: "the first x-ray tube".

Later in life, through his uncle, Richard Price, he became friends with noted radicals, including Tom Paine and Francis Burdett. He escaped with only a warning when in 1794, the authorities rounded up members of the movement and charged them with treason.

He died at Stamford Hill on 4 May 1833, and was buried at Hornsey.

Other publications:

- The Doctrine of Annuities and Assurances on Lives and Survivorships, 1779
- Examination of Dr. Crawford's theory of Heat and Combustion. London. 1781. OCLC 759116654. (Discusses the work of Adair Crawford)
  - Esame della teoria del sig. dottore Crawford intorno al calore ed alla combustione. Translated by Antonio Ria Vassalli. Turin: Giammichele Briolo. 1788. OCLC 1203443606. – translation into Italian
- Computation of Premiums for Life Assurance on the Basis of the Northampton Table of Mortality, manuscript
- Valuation (Individually) of the Assurance Contracts in Force in 1786, manuscript
- Yearly Computation of Expected Deaths and Accounts Showing the State of the Equitable Life Assurance Society According to the Plan Suggested by Richard Price, manuscript
- Nine Addresses to the General Court of the Equitable Society Covering the Years 1793 to 1830, 1833
