= The Crown Inn, Birmingham =

Pub in Birmingham, England

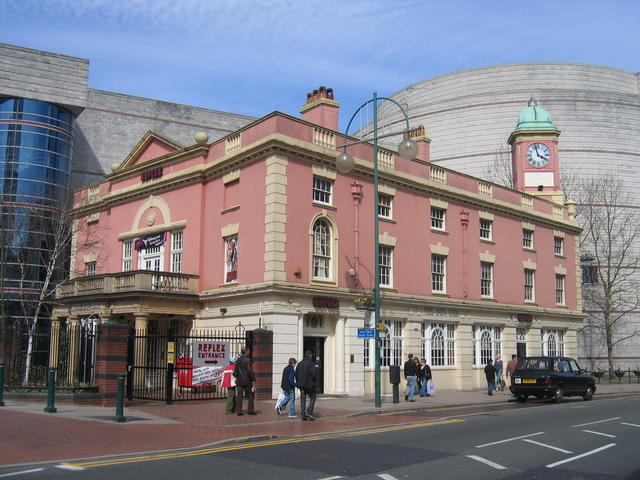
- The building in 2007
- Alternative names: The Crown; Reflex

General information
- Type: Public house
- Address: Broad Street
- Town or city: Birmingham
- Country: England
- Coordinates: 52.4782216°N 1.9106478°W
- Completed: 1781
- Designations

Listed Building – Grade II
- Official name: 36–37, Broad Street
- Designated: 7 July 1952
- Reference no.: 1220278

The Crown Inn is a public house in Broad Street, Birmingham, England. Built in 1781, it was rebuilt in 1883, 1930 and 1991. It is Grade II listed.

It was the brewery tap for William Butler's brewery, a Victorian building that survived at the rear of The Crown until 1987.

It sits alongside a Birmingham Canal Navigations canal and is nestled within the outline of the International Convention Centre.

The sash windows on the first and second floors are from the 1781 building. The architect for the 1883 work was William Jenkins, for the 1930 work, E F Reynolds, and in 1991 Alan Goodwin & Associates, who added a west façade described by the architectural critic Andy Foster as "cheap".

Since the early 2000s, it has operated as part of a chain of 1980s themed nightclubs under the name "Reflex".
