= Francis Edward Bache =

English composer

Francis Edward Bache (/ˈbeɪtʃ/; 14 September 1833 – 24 August 1858) was an English organist and composer.

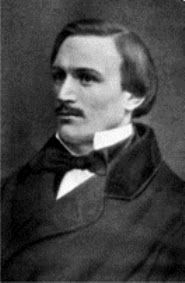
Francis Edward Bache

Born at Birmingham as the eldest of seven children of Samuel Bache, a well-known Unitarian minister, he studied with James Stimpson, Birmingham City Organist, and with violinist Alfred Mellon while being educated at his father's school. He played the violin in the 1846 Birmingham festival, and in 1849 went to London as a private composition student for three years under William Sterndale Bennett

In October 1850 Bache became organist of All Saints, Gordon Square. While continuing his studies with Sterndale Bennett, Bache composed concertos, overtures, two operettas, a string quartet and a piano trio along with many piano pieces. He made his debut as a concert performer at Keighley, Yorkshire on 21 January 1851. When he played the Allegro of an unpublished piano concerto of his own in June 1852, Henry Chorley remarked, "We have met with no Englishman for whom we have so long been waiting than Mr. Bache." In November 1851 Bache went to live with Mellon, who was then living in London, and in 1852 was given a contract by Addison, Hollier and Lucas to write light piano pieces; he turned out these works in considerable numbers. Of one of these he wrote, "I must say that I would sooner have written my Galop di Bravura than a Sonata which is only printed to lie on the shelf like a dead weight on account deficiency of anything like idea."

In 1853, on Sterndale Bennett's recommendation, Bache continued his musical education at Leipzig. He studied there with Moritz Hauptmann, acquiring the then-conventional prejudices against the music of Berlioz, Liszt and Wagner. (This would be in sharp contrast to his brother Walter, who would become a staunch champion of Liszt and Wagner's music.) After visiting Dresden, he returned to London by way of Paris in February 1855. He attended the 1855 Birmingham Festival and reviewed it for some of the local newspapers. Afterwards, he suffered a severe attack of the tuberculosis that had plagued him for several years.

On medical advice, Bache went to Algiers early in 1856. There he gave a concert on 28 March. He travelled by way of Paris to Leipzig, arriving there in June, then through Dresden and Vienna to Rome by December of that year. His health again deteriorated, so he returned home in June 1857. He spent the following winter in Torquay, where he succeeded in giving a concert in February 1858. After his return to Birmingham, his illness continued to progress. He died less than three weeks after a farewell concert of his music on 5 August, at the age of 24.

According to an evaluation in the Encyclopædia Britannica Eleventh Edition,

Considering the early age at which he died, his compositions are fairly numerous, and the best, a trio for piano and strings, was long held in high esteem. Two operettas, a piano concerto and a number of published pianoforte pieces and songs do little more than show how great was his promise.

His younger brother, Walter Bache (1842–1888), was a successful pianist and conductor.

A memoir of the two brothers, by their sister Constance Bache, appeared in 1901 under the title Brother Musicians.

== Selected works ==
- Andante and Allegro in D major, for organ
- 5 Charakterstücke for piano, op. 15 (pub. 1855)
- Duo brillante for violin and piano
- Flute Concerto (1852)
- 3 Impromptus for piano, op. 1
- 4 Mazurkas de Salon, op. 13 (pub. 1855)
- 6 Melodies, songs for voice and piano, op. 16 (1850)
- Piano Concerto in E major, op. 18 (1856)
- Piano Trio in D minor, op. 25 (c. 1852, pub. 1865)
- Polonaise for piano and orchestra, op. 9 (1854)
- 2 Romances for violin and piano (or cello and piano), op. 21 (pub. 1859)
- Rubezahl, opera (1852)
- Souvenirs d'Italie for piano, op. 19
- Souvenirs de Torquay for piano, op. 26 (pub. 1859)
- String Quartet in F major, (1851)
- Which is Which, opera

== Bibliography ==
- Bache, Constance, Brother Musicians: Reminiscences of Edward and Walter Bache (London: Methuen & Co., 1901). ISBN 1-120-26866-4
- Grove, George, ed. (1900). "Bache, Francis" . A Dictionary of Music and Musicians. Vol. 1.4. London: Macmillan and Company. p. 120.
- Temperley, Nicholas, "Bache. English family of musicians. (1) Francis Edward Bache," The New Grove Dictionary of Music and Musicians, First Edition (London: Macmillan, 1980), 20 vols. ISBN 0-333-23111-2
