= New College at Hackney =

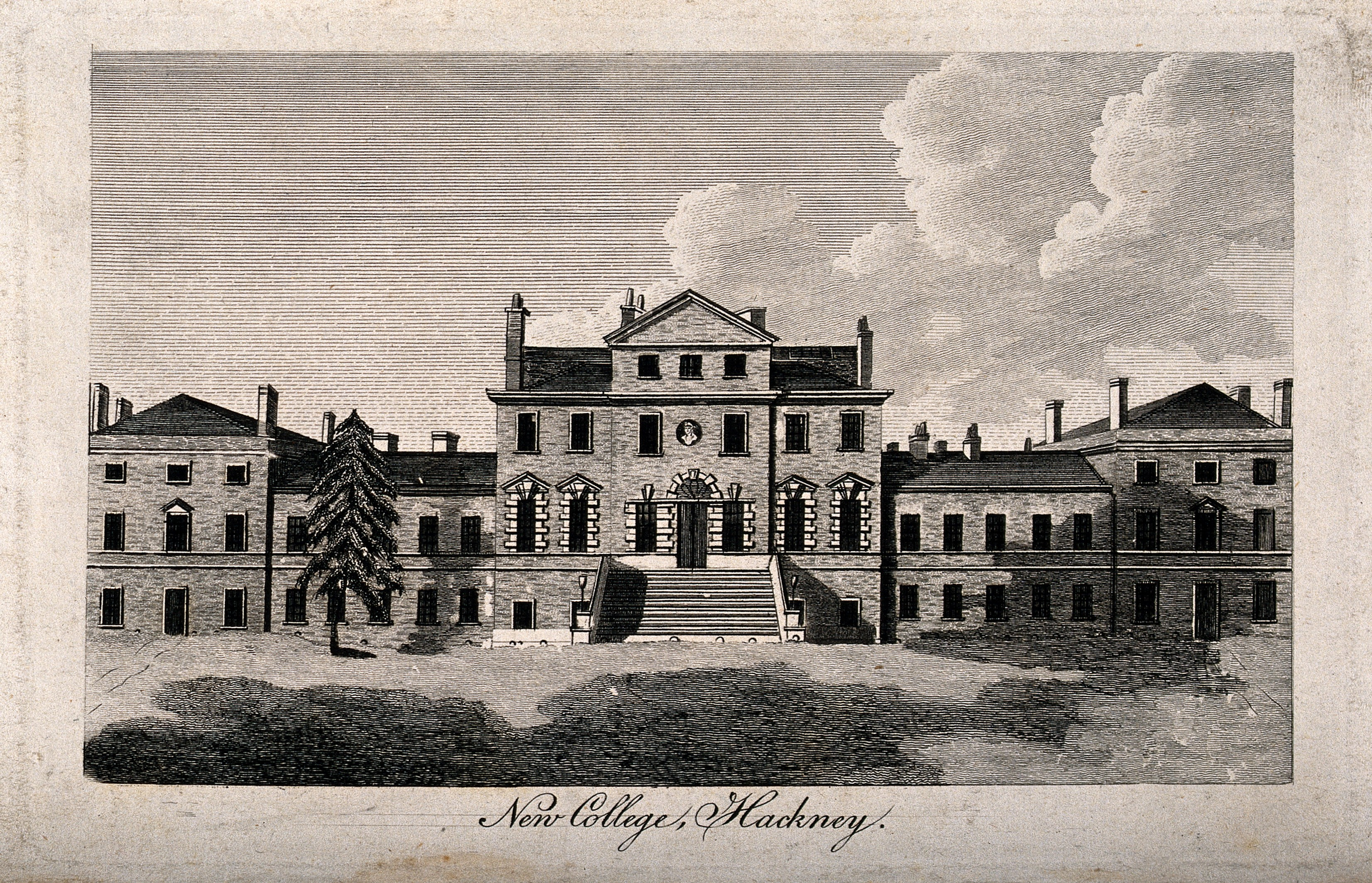
New College, Hackney. Engraving from 1786.

The New College at Hackney (more ambiguously known as Hackney College) was a dissenting academy set up in Hackney in April 1786 by the social and political reformer Richard Price and others; Hackney at that time was a village on the outskirts of London, by Unitarians. It was in existence from 1786 to 1796. The writer William Hazlitt was among its pupils, sent aged 15 to prepare for the Unitarian ministry, and some of the best-known Dissenting intellectuals spent time on its staff.

== History ==
The year 1786 marked the dissolution of Warrington Academy, which had been inactive since 1756 as a teaching institution. Almost simultaneously the Hoxton Academy of the Coward Trust, under Samuel Morton Savage, closed its doors in the summer of 1785. Some of the funding that had backed Warrington was available for a new dissenting academy for the London area, as well as for a northern successor in Manchester. The London building plans were ambitious, but proved the undoing of the New College, which was soon strained financially.

The successors in the movement as a whole were Manchester New College, and a new Exeter College under Joseph Bretland, which existed from 1799 to 1805.

== Staff ==
Its staff included:

- Thomas Belsham who left Daventry Academy in 1789 on becoming a Unitarian, as professor of divinity and resident tutor
- Andrew Kippis
- George Cadogan Morgan from 1787 to 1891, who lectured there on electricity
- Richard Price
- Joseph Priestley, resident in Hackney from 1791 to 1794, as lecturer on history and natural philosophy, principally chemistry
- Abraham Rees, who was tutor in Hebrew and mathematics
- Gilbert Wakefield from 1790

== Students ==
Among the students were:

- Arthur Aikin
- Francis Baily
- John Bostock attended Priestley's lectures
- William Hazlitt
- Mary Hays
- Thomas Dix Hincks
- David Jones, previously at Homerton College, moved to Hackney on becoming a Unitarian, then a tutor in experimental philosophy, moving away in 1792 to fill Priestley's ministry in Birmingham
- John Jones, related to David Jones
- Jeremiah Joyce
- John Kentish, who left Daventry Academy with other students, including William Shepherd, in 1788, for religious reasons
- Harry Priestley, Dr Priestley's youngest son
- Thomas Starling Norgate
- William Shepherd
- James Smith (1775–1839)
- Joseph Lomas Towers
- Charles Wellbeloved

== Institutions with related names ==
Another Hackney College, properly Hackney Itineracy, also known as Hackney Academy and Hackney Theological College, was set up in 1802 by George Collison. It is this one that became part of New College London, and in the end part of the University of London. Homerton College was at this time in the parish of Hackney, and had been in some form from 1730, as a less ambitious academy; when the New College folded, its future became part of Homerton College's, which since 1894 has been in Cambridge. Robert Aspland set up a successor Unitarian college at Hackney, in 1813.

== See also ==
- List of dissenting academies (1660–1800)
