= Abraham Rees =

Welsh nonconformist minister

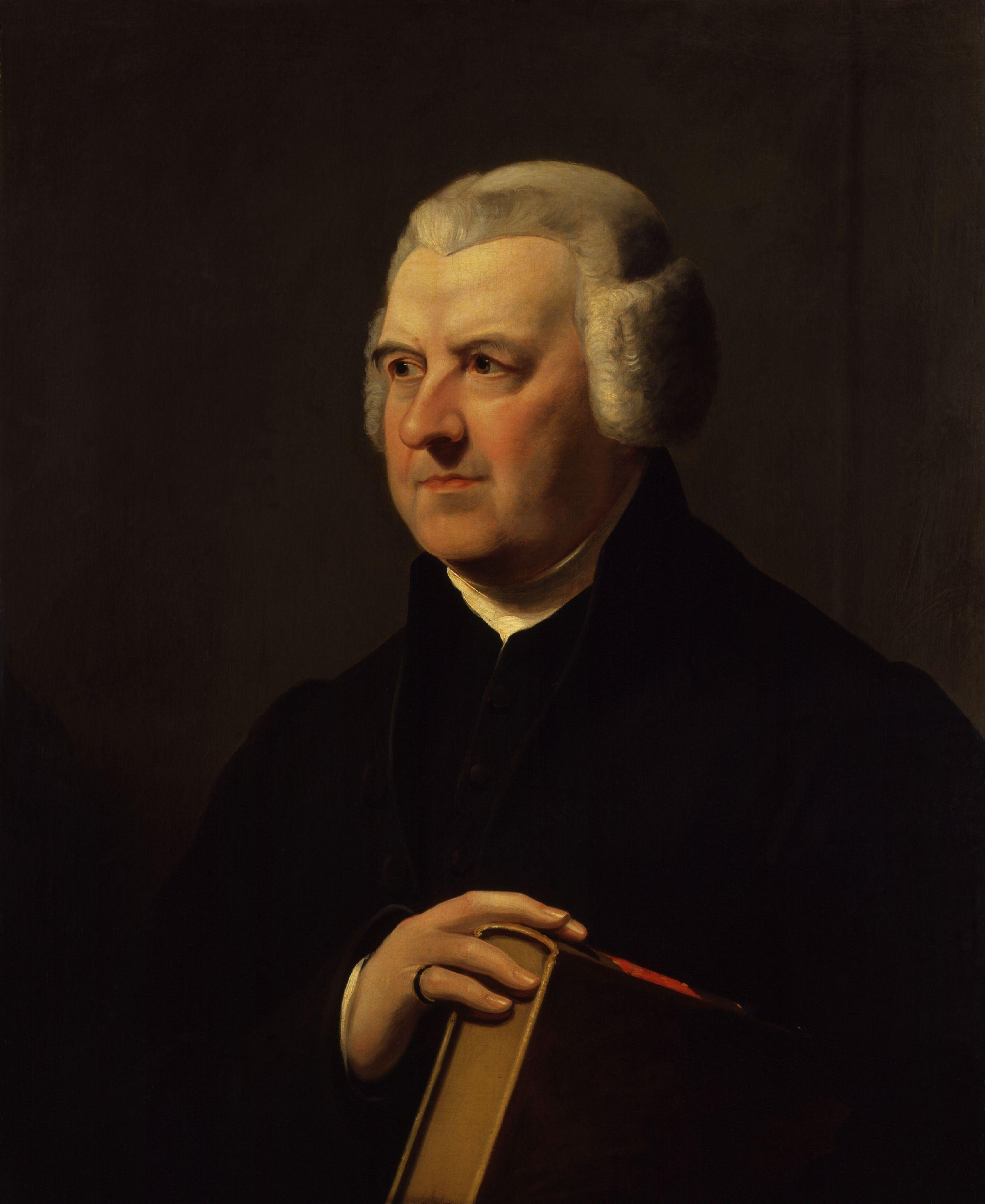
Abraham Rees, c. 1802.

Abraham Rees (1743 – 9 June 1825) was a Welsh nonconformist minister, and compiler of Rees's Cyclopædia (in 45 volumes).

== Life ==
He was the second son of Esther, daughter of Abraham Penry, and her husband Lewis Rees, and was born in Llanbrynmair, Montgomeryshire. Lewis Rees (1710-1800) was independent minister at Llanbrynmair (1734–1759) and Mynyddbach, Glamorganshire (1759–1800). Rees was educated for the ministry at Coward's academy in Wellclose Square, near London, under David Jennings, entering in 1759. In 1762 he was appointed assistant tutor in mathematics and natural philosophy; on the move of the academy to Hoxton after Jennings's death in 1762 he became resident tutor, a position which he held till 1785, his colleagues being Andrew Kippis and Samuel Morton Savage; subsequently he was tutor in Hebrew and mathematics in the New College at Hackney (1786–96).

His first ministerial engagement was in the independent congregation at Clapham, where he preached once a fortnight, as assistant to Philip Furneaux. In 1768 he became assistant to Henry Read (1686–1774) in the presbyterian congregation at St Thomas's, Southwark, and succeeded him as pastor in 1774. He moved to the pastorate of the Old Jewry congregation in 1783, and retained this charge till his death, being both morning and afternoon preacher (unusual then, among London presbyterians); he shared also (from 1773) a Sunday-evening lecture at Salters' Hall, and was one of the Tuesday-morning lecturers at Salters' Hall till 1795. A new meeting-house, of octagon form, was erected for him in Jewin Street and opened 10 December 1809. He was elected trustee of Dr Daniel Williams's foundations in 1774, and secretary of the presbyterian board in 1778, and held both offices till his death. On 31 January 1775 he received the degree of DD from the University of Edinburgh. He made a triennial visit to Wales as examiner of Carmarthen Academy. In 1806 he was appointed distributor of the English regium donum. He was elected a Foreign Honorary Member of the American Academy of Arts and Sciences in 1813.

When he presented the address of the body of ministers of the 'three denominations' (Presbyterians, Independents and Baptists) in 1820 on the accession of George IV, it was noted that, as a student, he had attended the similar deputation to George III sixty years before. According to Alexander Gordon (Unitarian) in the Dictionary of National Biography, his theology was of a mediating and transitional character; his doctrines had an evangelical flavour, though essentially of an Arian type, and inclining to those of Richard Price, and he held the tenet of a universal restoration. He was the last of the London dissenting ministers who officiated in a wig.

He died at his residence in Artillery Place, Finsbury, on 9 June 1825, and was buried on 18 June in Bunhill Fields, the pall being borne by six ministers of the 'three denominations.' A funeral oration was delivered by Thomas Rees, and the funeral sermon, on 19 June, by Robert Aspland. Rees survived his wife and all his children, but left several grandchildren. His son, Nathaniel Penry Rees, died 8 July 1802, on a voyage from Bengal to St Helena. His only daughter Joanna Rees born 17 April 1769 in Hoxton Town, Shoreditch married John Jones.

Abraham married on 3 July 1764 to Joanna Goldney. Children were: Charles Goldney Rees Nathaniel Penry Rees Joanna Rees Philip Lewis Rees, born 12 Oct 1772 in Hoxton Town, died 25 Feb 1798, buried in Dissenting Chapel Yard. Rivington, Lancs

== Works ==
Rees's work as a cyclopædist began as an improver of the Cyclopædia of Ephraim Chambers, originally published in 1728, in 2 volumes. This was re-edited by Rees in 1778; and, with the incorporation of a supplement and much new matter, was issued by him in 1781–6, in 4 volumes; reprinted 1788–91. In recognition of his labour he was elected in 1786 a Fellow of the Royal Society, and subsequently of the Linnean Society. He then projected a more comprehensive publication. The first part of The Cyclopædia; or, Universal Dictionary of Arts, Sciences, and Literature was issued on 2 January 1802, and the work was completed in forty-five volumes, including six volumes of plates, in August 1820. The parts were issued at irregular intervals, two parts constituting a volume. Great attention is paid to English biography; the botanical articles were generally contributed by Sir James Edward Smith and the music articles by Charles Burney. Congratulated, on the completion of his task, by his friend, John Evans (1767–1827), Rees wrote in reply: 'I thank you, but I feel more grateful that I have been spared to publish my four volumes of sermons.' The Cyclopædia; ... is commonly known as Rees's Cyclopædia.

Besides single sermons (1770–1813), Rees published 'Practical Sermons,' 1809, 2 vols.; 2nd ed. 1812, with two additional volumes, 1821. In conjunction with Kippis, Thomas Jervis, and Thomas Morgan, LLD, he brought out 'A Collection of Hymns and Psalms,' &c., 1795, (the ninth edition, 1823, is revised by Rees and Jervis). This collection, generally known as Kippis's, was the first attempt to supply, for general use among liberal dissenters, a hymnal to take the place of Isaac Watts's. It was supplemented in 1807, and again in 1852.
