= Samuel Bache =

English Unitarian minister

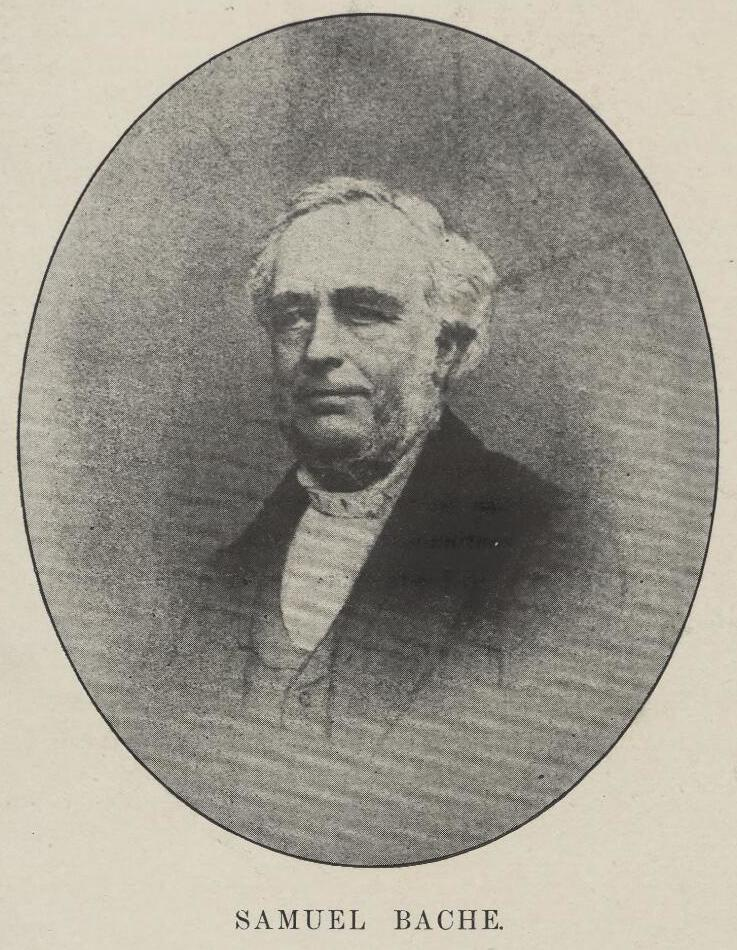
Samuel Bache

Samuel Bache (24 December 1804 – 7 January 1876) was an English Unitarian minister.

== Life ==
He was born at Bridgnorth, Shropshire, where his father, Joshua Tilt Bache (d. 28 October 1837, aged 63), was a grocer. His mother was Margaret Silvester, of Newport in the same county. On her death, in 1808, he was entrusted to his father's sister, Mrs. Maurice, at Stourbridge, and he became the pupil of Rev. Thomas Ebenezer Beasley, a dissenting minister at Uxbridge.

He was some time assistant in the school of the Rev. Lant Carpenter, LL.D., at Bristol, and was educated for the ministry (January 1826–29) at Manchester College, York, under Charles Wellbeloved (theology), John Kenrick, M.A. (classics), and William Turner, M.A. (science). He was minister at the Old Meeting, Dudley, 1829–32, and in 1832 became colleague of John Kentish (1768–1853) at the New Meeting, Birmingham (Joseph Priestley's congregation). He served at Birmingham from 1832 to 1868.

He married Emily (d. 1855), second daughter of the Rev. Edward Higginson of Derby (1781–1832), whose eldest daughter, Helen (d. 1877), was the wife of the Rev. James Martineau. He and Emily had seven children. Francis Edward Bache, the composer, was the eldest; another was Walter Bache, the musician; the youngest son, John Kentish, some time a dissenting minister, took Anglican orders in 1876.

For many years Bache kept a school. In 1859 he took a leading part with the Rev. Dr. Miller, rector of St. Martin's, in the establishment of Hospital Sunday, an institution originated in Birmingham. He was visitor of Manchester New College, London, 1861–65. He was secretary to the ‘Warwickshire and adjourning Counties Unitarian Tract Society’ and the ‘Monthly meeting of Protestant Dissenting Ministers of Warwickshire and the Neighbouring Counties’.

In 1862 the New Meeting, Moor Street, was sold to Roman Catholics. The congregation moved to the Church of the Messiah, Birmingham (foundation laid 11 August 1860) at Broad Street. Mr. Bache had as colleague in 1863-7 the Rev. Henry Enfield Dowson. In 1868 he resigned the ministry from failing health, and, being afflicted with softening of the brain, he resided for the last two years of his life in the house of a physician at Gloucester, where he died on 7 January 1876 aged 71.

He was a preacher and public man of strong powers, correct attainment, and cultivated taste; formal and urbane in manner. Among unitarians he represented the conservative school which aimed to carry out the principles of Locke's Reasonableness of Christianity, regarding Jesus Christ as the miraculously attested exponent of a pure morality and a simple theology, and the revealer, by his resurrection, of an eternal life. On 23 May 1866 he proposed the embodiment in the constitution of the British and Foreign Unitarian Association of a 'recognition of the special divine mission and authority, as a religious teacher, of Jesus Christ,' which was met by carrying the previous question.

== Works ==
A list of twenty-two of his publications (1833–70) is given by J. Gordon, including:

- Harmony of Science and Revelation, 1839.
- Funeral Sermon for John Kentish, 1853.
- Exposition of Unitarian Views of Christianity, 1854.
- Miracles the Credentials of the Christ, 1863.
