= George Cadogan Morgan =

Welsh dissenting minister and scientist

George Cadogan Morgan (1754 - 17 November 1798) was a Welsh dissenting minister and scientist.

== Life ==
He was born in 1754 at Bridgend, Glamorganshire, the second son of William Morgan, a surgeon practising in that town, by his wife Sarah, sister of Dr. Richard Price. William Morgan, the pioneer of actuarial science, was his elder brother. George was educated at Cowbridge grammar school and, for a time, at Jesus College, Oxford, whence he matriculated 10 October 1771.

An intention of taking holy orders in the Church of England was abandoned, owing to the death of his father and the poverty of his family. His religious views also changed, and he soon became, under the guidance of his uncle, Richard Price, a student at the dissenting academy at Hoxton, where he remained for several years.

In 1776, he settled as Unitarian minister at Norwich, where it is said that his advanced opinions exposed him to much annoyance from the clergy of the town. He was subsequently minister at Yarmouth for 1785–6, but moved to Hackney early in 1787, and became associated with Dr. Price in starting New College at Hackney, where he acted as tutor until 1791.

In 1789, accompanied by three friends, he set out on a tour through France, and his letters to his wife descriptive of the journey are still preserved. He was in Paris at the storming of the Bastille, and is supposed to have been the first to communicate the news to England. He sympathised with the revolution in its earlier stages, and held very optimistic views as to human progress, believing that the mind could be so developed as to receive, by intuition, knowledge which is now attainable only through research. In 1791, following the death of Dr Price, he hoped for his position as preacher at the Gravel-pit meeting-house at Hackney, but, unsuccessful, he retired to Southgate, a village a few miles to the north. There he undertook the education of private pupils, and met with much success.

Morgan gained a high reputation as a scientific writer, his best-known work being his Lectures on Electricity, which he had delivered to the students at Hackney. In these he foreshadowed several of the discoveries of subsequent scientific men. In chemistry, he was an advocate of the opinions of Stahl in opposition to those of Lavoisier, and was engaged upon a work on the subject at the time of his death.

In 1785, he communicated to the Royal Society a paper containing 'Observations and Experiments on the Light of Bodies in a state of Combustion'. He was also the author of 'Directions for the use of a Scientific Table in the Collection and Application of Knowledge, . . . with a Life of the Author'. This contains an elaborate table for the systematisation of all knowledge. He also made considerable progress in writing the memoirs of Dr. Richard Price.

He died on 17 November 1798 of a fever contracted, it was supposed, while making a chemical experiment in which he inhaled some poison.

== Family ==
By his wife, Nancy Hurry of Yarmouth, he had seven sons and one daughter, Sarah, wife of Luke Ashburner of Bombay, who was a prominent figure in Bombay society. Two of the sons, William Ashburner Morgan and Edward Morgan, successively became solicitors to the East India Company, while most of the others settled in America, where the eldest, Richard Price Morgan, was connected with railroad and other engineering works.

== Sources ==
- Thomas, D. O. (2004). "Morgan, George Cadogan (1754–1798)". Oxford Dictionary of National Biography. Oxford University Press.
