= Church of the Messiah, Birmingham =

Church of the Messiah
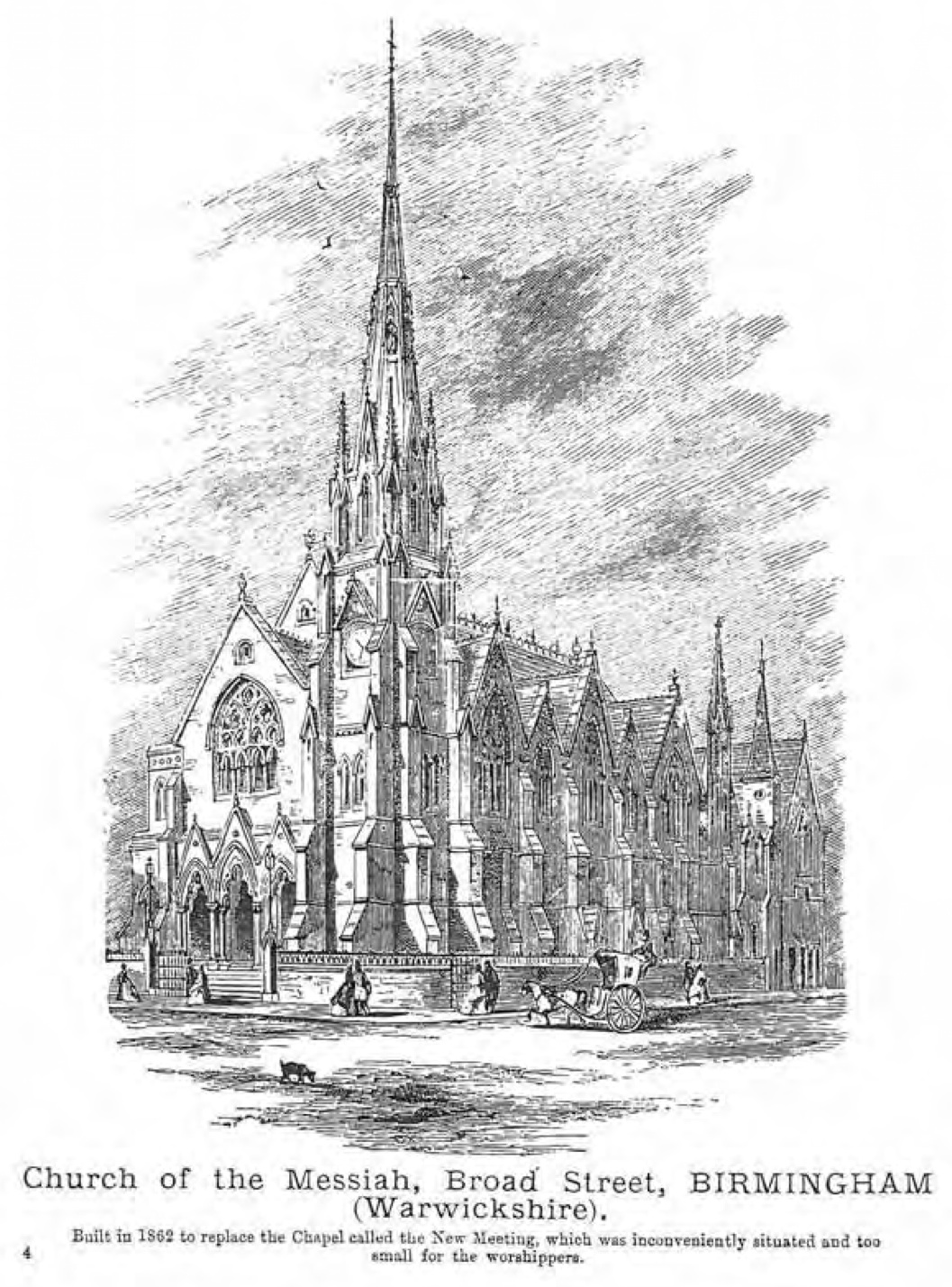
- Former Church of the Messiah, Broad Street, Birmingham.
- Church of the Messiah
- 52.47792°N 1.91102°W
- Location: Broad Street, Birmingham
- Country: England
- Denomination: Unitarian

Architecture
- Architect: John Jones Bateman
- Groundbreaking: 1860
- Completed: 1862
- Construction cost: £10,000
- Demolished: 1978

Specifications
- Capacity: 950 people
- Length: 106 feet (32 m)
- Width: 65 feet (20 m)
- Height: 150 feet (46 m)

The Church of the Messiah, Birmingham was a Unitarian place of worship on Broad Street. The impressive Victorian Gothic church was constructed between 1860-1862 and straddled the Birmingham Canal. The congregation pre-dates the building, and has continued following its demolition in 1978. Those who worshipped there include politicians of local and national importance.

== History ==
The foundation of the congregation goes back to 1692 when the first meeting house was built, afterwards known as the Lower Meeting House, Deritend. When the congregation outgrew this in 1732, they moved into a new chapel in Moor Street. By the 1860s this was also too small so a new church was commissioned. The Moor Street chapel was sold to a Roman Catholic congregation, and became St Michael's Church.

The new Church of the Messiah was built to designs by the architect John Jones Bateman, the contractors being George Branson and Edwin Gwyther. The foundation stone was laid on 11 August 1860 and the church opened on 1 January 1862, at a cost of £10,000. The site was unusual in that it straddled the Birmingham Canal, forming part of the Broad Street canal tunnel.

Early members of the congregation included members of the Martineau family who would produce many Birmingham Lord Mayors throughout the 19th and 20th centuries and Samuel Carter. Joseph Chamberlain, and his son Neville Chamberlain, prime minister 1937–1940, attended services in this church.

The congregation moved to purpose-built premises at Five Ways in 1973.

== Organ ==
An organ was provided by Nicholson of Worcester in 1862, but by 1882 the congregation had commissioned a new one from William Hill and Son at a cost of £1571. This was rebuilt by Nicholson's in 1923. A specification of the organ can be found on the National Pipe Organ Register. Several newspaper sources suggest that the 1862 organ was built and erected by Halmshaw and Sons, who then advertised for sale an earlier organ from the Moor street Chapel, refer to Talk section for more details of this.

== Ministers ==
- John Sillitoe, 1692–1704
- Thomas Pickard, 1705–1747
- Samuel Bourn, 1732–1754
- Samuel Blyth, 1747–1791
- William Hawkes, 1754–1780
- Joseph Priestley, 1780–1791
- John Edwards, 1791–1802
- David Jones, 1792–1795
- John Kentish, 1803–1853
- Joshua Toulmin, 1804–1815
- James Yates, 1817–1826
- John Reynell Wreford, 1826–1831
- Samuel Bache, 1832–1868
- Henry William Crosskey, 1869–1893
- Lawrence Pearsall Jacks, 1894–1903
- John Worsley Austin, 1903–????

== Organists ==
- John Gilbert Mills, ca. 1923
