= David Jones (barrister) =

Welsh barrister (1765–1816)

David Jones (1765–1816) was a Welsh barrister.

Jones was best known as ‘the Welsh Freeholder’. He was born in 1765, the only son of John Jones of Bwlchygwynt, near Llandovery, Carmarthenshire, where his father farmed his own freehold. He was a relative of John Jones, Unitarian critic. He received his early education at Pencader and Abergavenny, and in 1783 entered Homerton College, London, with the view of preparing for the ministry among the Calvinistic dissenters, but, adopting Unitarian views, moved to Hackney College.

There he became tutor and lecturer in experimental philosophy until, in October 1792, he took charge of the New Meeting congregation at Birmingham, as successor to Joseph Priestley, who had recommended him for the post. During his ministry there he delivered in 1794–5 ‘some admirable courses of lectures on the philosophy of the human mind, as connected with education, the theory of morals, and also on history.’ Turning to the study of the law, he was admitted a student of Lincoln's Inn on 1 May 1795, was called to the bar on 26 June 1800, and practised chiefly as a chancery barrister, but attached himself as well to the Oxford and South Wales circuits. He also became a member of Caius College, Cambridge, graduating B.A. in 1800 and M.A. in 1803. He died in 1816.

Jones made a spirited defence of unitarianism against the attacks of Bishop Samuel Horsley in several works written under the name of 'The Welsh Freeholder'.

== Works ==
as 'The Welsh Freeholder'

- A Letter to the [Bishop] on the Charge he lately delivered, London, 1790, 8vo, which evoked ‘An Answer … by a Clergyman of the Diocese of St. Davids,’ London, 1750, 8vo
- The Welsh Freeholder's Vindication of his Letter, &c., London, 1791, 8vo.
- Reasons for Unitarianism, or the Primitive Christian Doctrine, London, 1792
- The Welsh Freeholder's Farewell Epistles to the Bishop (lately of St. Davids), now of Rochester, London, 1794, 8vo.

as David Jones

- Thoughts on the Riots at Birmingham, Bath, 1791, 8vo, an enlarged reprint of an anonymous letter written by Jones in the Morning Chronicle, and republished without his authority both at Maidstone and Birmingham.
- The Nature and Duties of the Office of a Minister of Religion, Birmingham, 1792, 8vo.
- The Revolution in France and the Progress of Liberty, considered in connection with our idea of Providence and of the Improvement of Human Affairs (see advertisement in The Nature and Duties, &c.), announced by Jones in 1816, is not known to have been published.
