= Alice K. Bache =

Art collector (1903–1977)

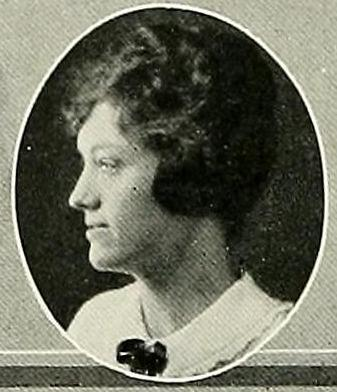
- Born: 1903
- Died: 1977
- Occupations: Art collector, philanthropist
- Children: Paul Kay, Ellen Stephen Kay

Alice K. Bache (1903-1977) was a philanthropist and art collector of mostly ancient art including Cycladic, Pre-Columbian, Mexican, Asian and Peruvian works of art. She amassed one of the finest and most extensive private collections of pre-Columbian artifacts, which she began gifting to the Metropolitan Museum of Art in 1967.

== Early life ==
Bache was born Alice Odenheimer, daughter of Pauline Freyan and the Lane Cotton Mills textile scion Sigmund Odenheimer in New Orleans. She graduated from Tulane University, then earned a master's degree in philosophy at Columbia University. Her children from her first marriage to William de Young Kay were Paul Kay, professor emeritus of anthropology at the University, of California, Berkeley, and Ellen Kay. In 1954 Alice Odenheimer married brokerage firm head Harold Bache.

== Philanthropy ==
Alice K. Bache was active in the affairs of the Johnson Art Museum at Cornell University and the Virginia Museum of Fine Arts in Richmond, and served as director of the Japan Society, president of the New York Section of the National Council of Jewish Women and Mayor's Advisory Board.
