= Broad Street Presbyterian Church, Birmingham =

Broad Street Presbyterian Church
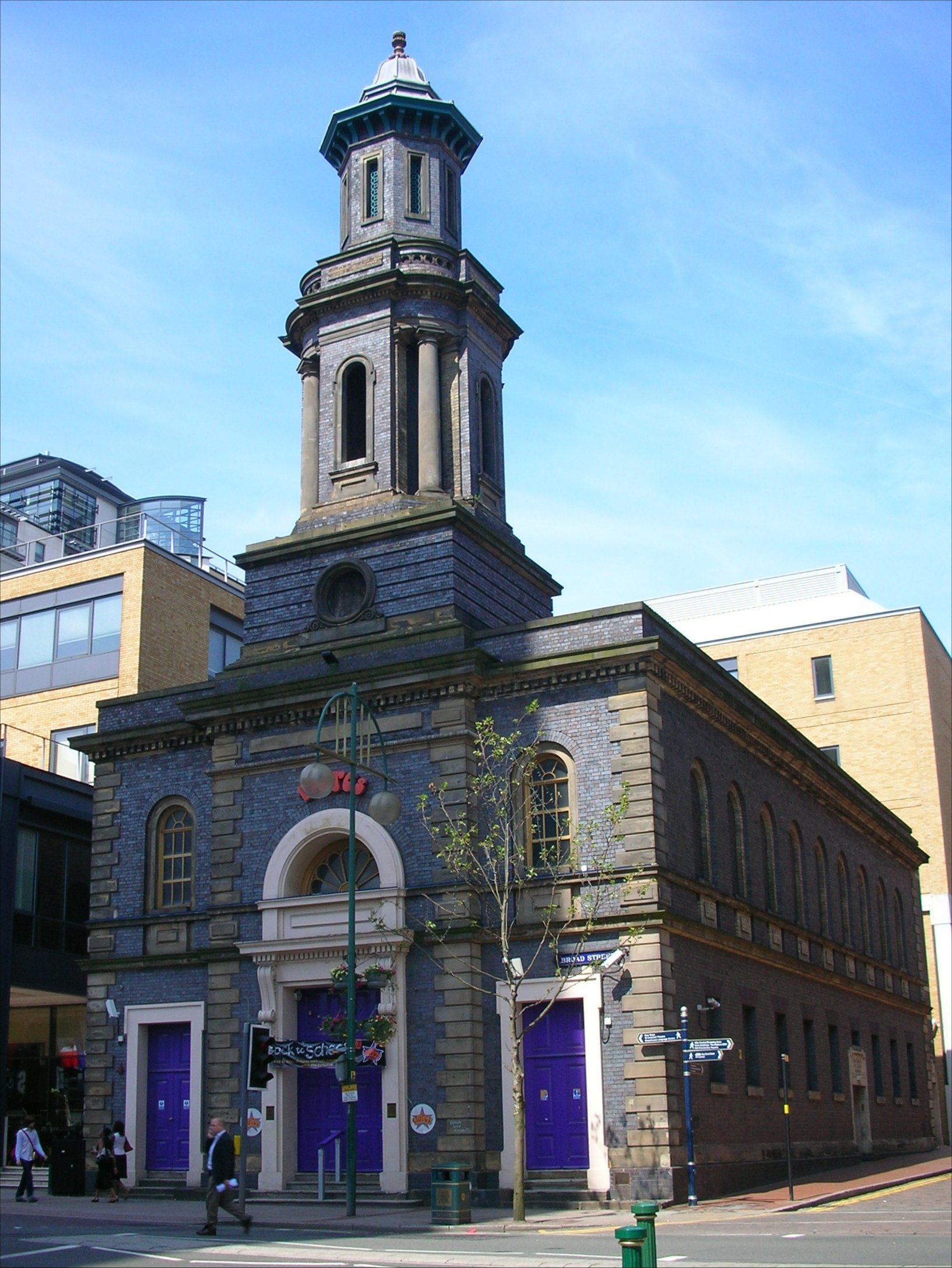
- Broad Street Presbyterian Church
- 52°28′37.2″N 1°54′42.12″W
- OS grid reference: SP 06058 86584
- Location: Broad Street, Birmingham
- Country: England
- Denomination: Christian Scientist
- Previous denomination: Presbyterian

Architecture
- Heritage designation: Grade II listed
- Architect: J.R. Botham
- Groundbreaking: 1848
- Completed: 1849

Broad Street Presbyterian Church is a Grade II listed former Presbyterian church, and later Second Church of Christ Scientist, on Broad Street, Birmingham, England.

== History ==
The foundation stone was laid on 24 July 1848 by Charles Cowan MP and the church opened in 1849. Some restoration work was undertaken in 1859.

By the early 20th century, the church was not prospering, and in 1914 there was a proposal to turn it into a cinema.

In 1929 the building was acquired by the Second Church of Christ Scientist. Since closure it has been used as a nightclub.

== Organ ==
The church had a pipe organ by Brindley and Foster. A specification of the organ can be found on the National Pipe Organ Register.
