= Broad Street, Birmingham =

Major thoroughfare and popular nightspot centre in Central Birmingham, England

Coordinates: 52.4777°N 1.9111°W

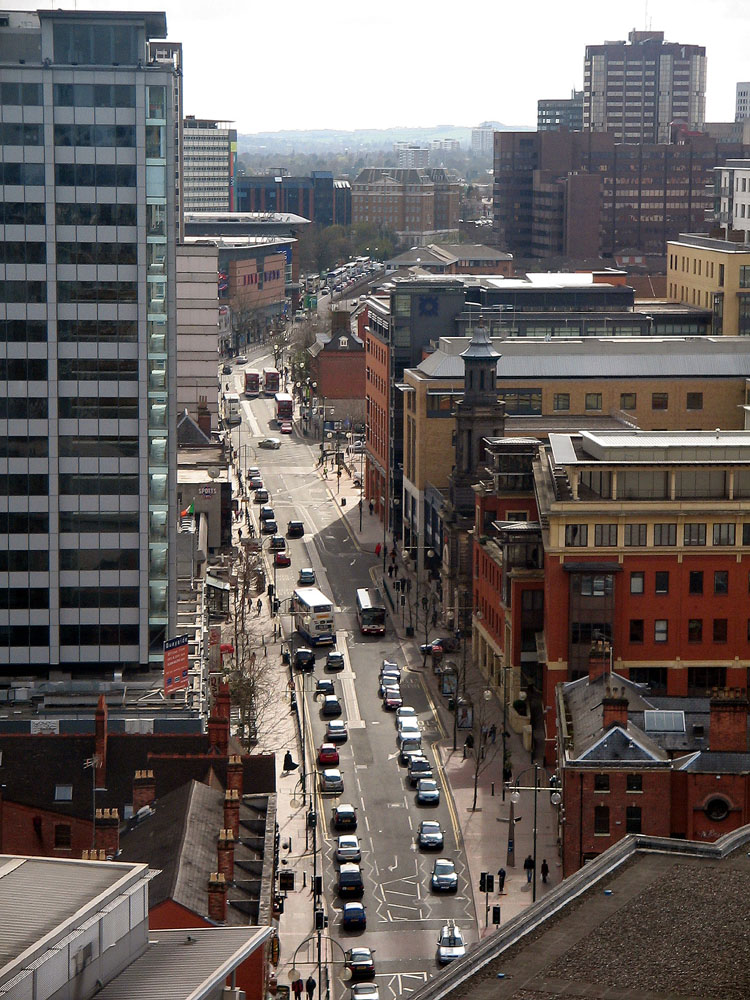
Broad Street in Birmingham in April 2005, looking towards Five Ways

Broad Street is a major thoroughfare and popular nightspot centre in Central Birmingham, England. Traditionally, Broad Street was considered to be outside Birmingham City Centre, but as the city centre expanded with the removal of the Inner Ring Road, Broad Street has been incorporated into the new Westside district of the city centre due to its position within the A4540 road.

Broad Street is also the centre of Birmingham's banking and financial centre. It can boast region head offices of Lloyds Banking Group, Royal Bank of Scotland, Deutsche Bank, HSBC and many other banking organisations. More than 15,000 people are employed in this sector, in this area of Birmingham.

== History ==
=== Early history ===
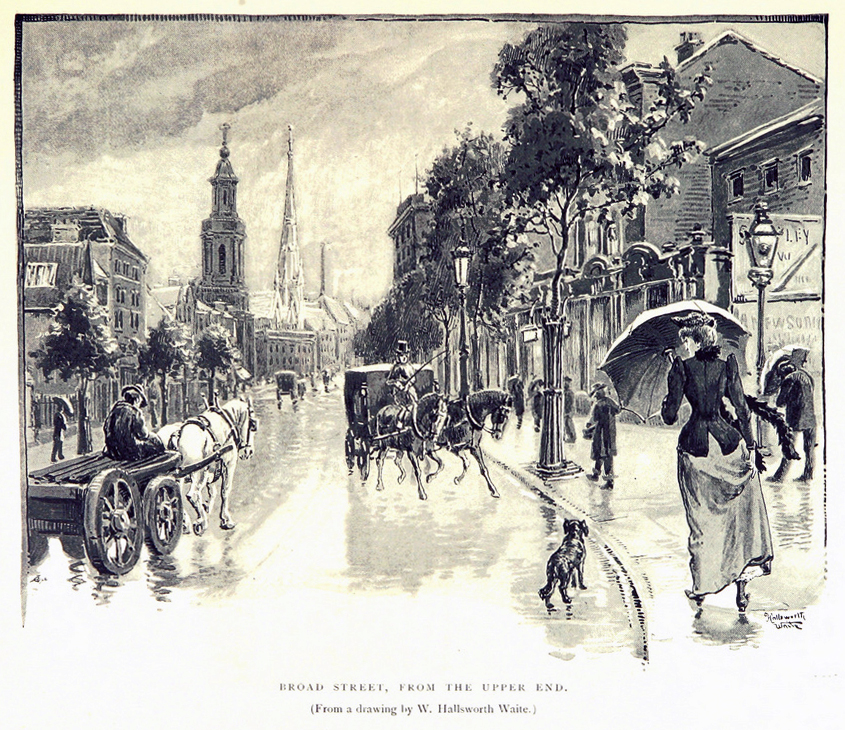
A print from an 1894 book showing the former Presbyterian church and now demolished Church of the Messiah (on Broad Street Tunnel)

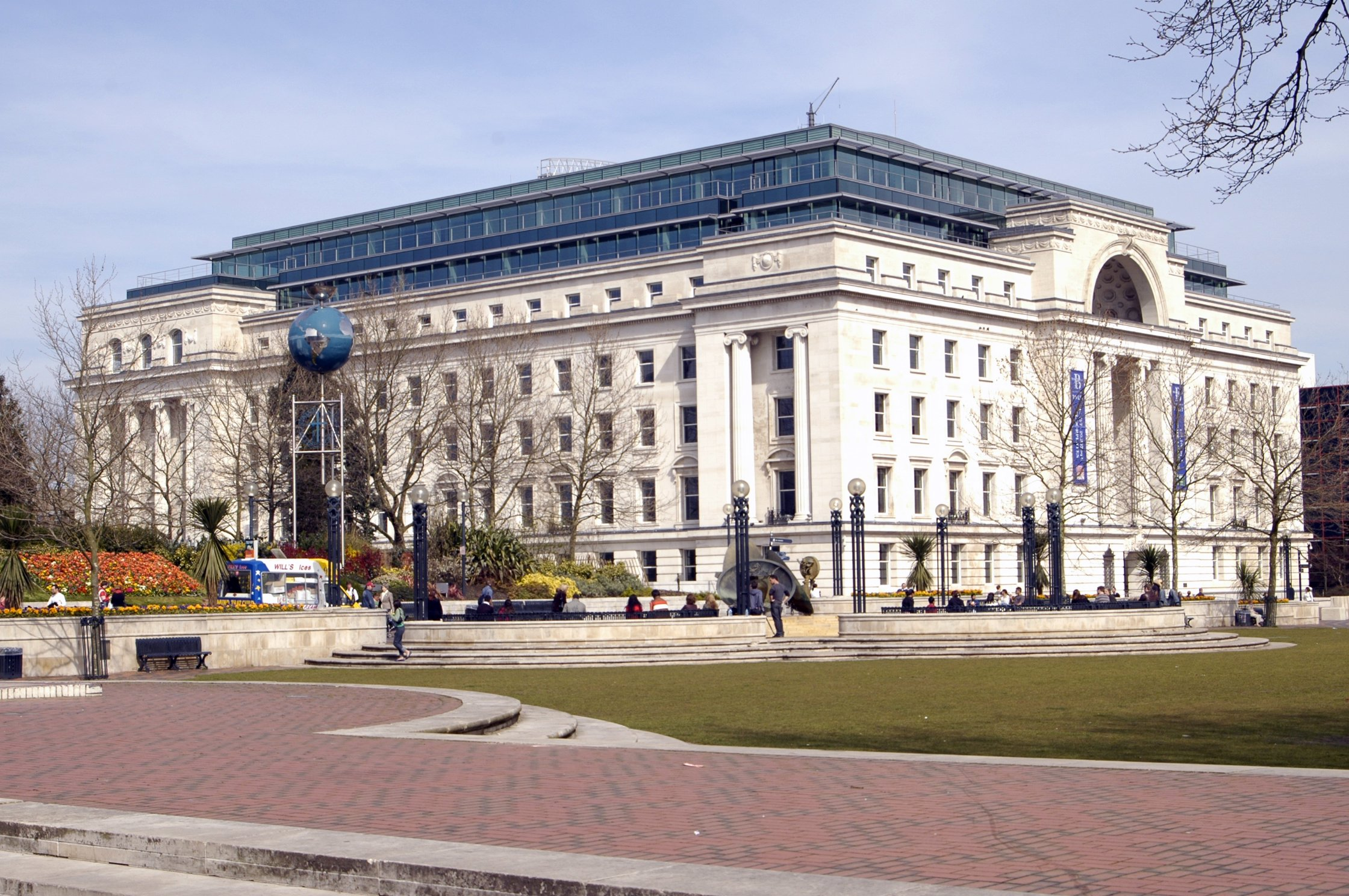
Baskerville House in 2007

In the 1500s, the area which is now known as Broad Street was made up of several schools and guilds such as The Biddles/Free School, Colmore, Shillon/Smallbrooke Guild/School, Billwiggler Croft and Byngas Hall which was later to become a home for the Lloyds Bank family and subsequently Bingley Hall and then Symphony Hall/ICC after Bingley Hall burned down.

In the 1750s, Broad Street was an unnamed country path that ran across Easy Hill from Bewdley Street (now Victoria Square) and Swinford Street (now the top end of New Street) to Five Ways and on to Stourbridge and Bewdley.

However, in the following years, Easy Hill began to develop with the construction of a house by John Baskerville, a local printer and type-face designer. This led to the widening of the street which passed in front of his house. The path was soon removed and an established street was added that ran to the border of Edgbaston and, as a result of its widening, it was named Broad Street.

St Martin's Church owned land on the southern end of Broad Street, at what is now Five Ways, and began to develop the land in 1773 after the passing of an Act of Parliament. The 22-acre (8.9 ha) site was developed into an estate known as the 'Six Closes' or the 'Islington Estate' (named after Islington Row which bounded the south of the site). The Crown Inn was built in 1781, and survives in modified form. By 1795, several streets had been created according to Pye's map. One of the streets that remain from the development is Tennant Street, named after William Tennant who had the advowson of St Martin's Church. Development slowed as a result of overseas wars, but rapidly increased after the Battle of Waterloo.

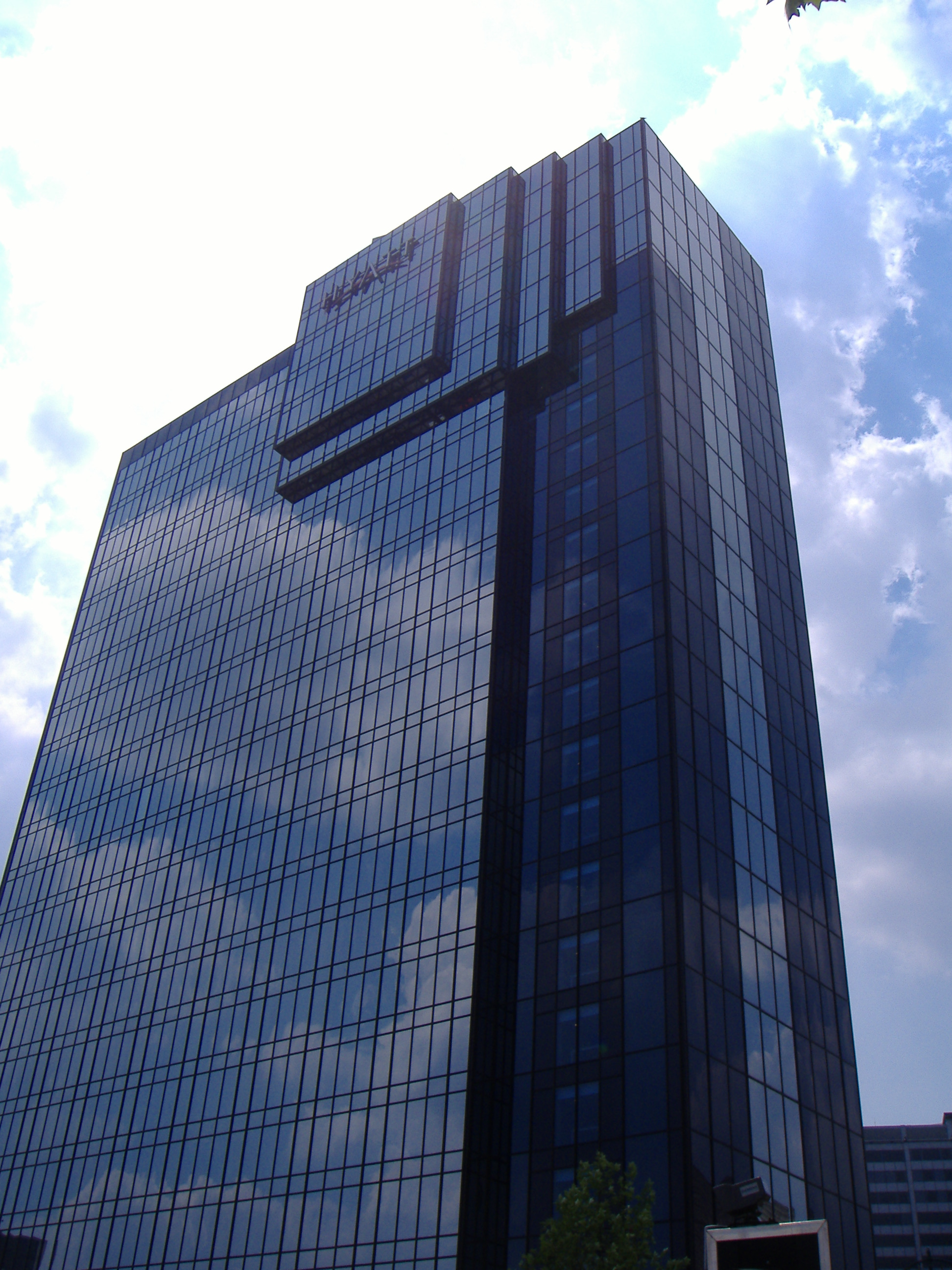
Hyatt Regency Hotel

Land along the street also developed and became a well established neighbourhood as a result of the connections with industry and Edgbaston, an upmarket area. In the 19th century, well established industries were established along the canals at the northern end of the street and residential properties were built at the southern end. Churches of various denominations were also built along the stretch of Broad Street, such as the Unitarian Church of the Messiah, the Roman Catholic St Peter's Church, and the Anglican Immanuel Church.

=== Transformation ===
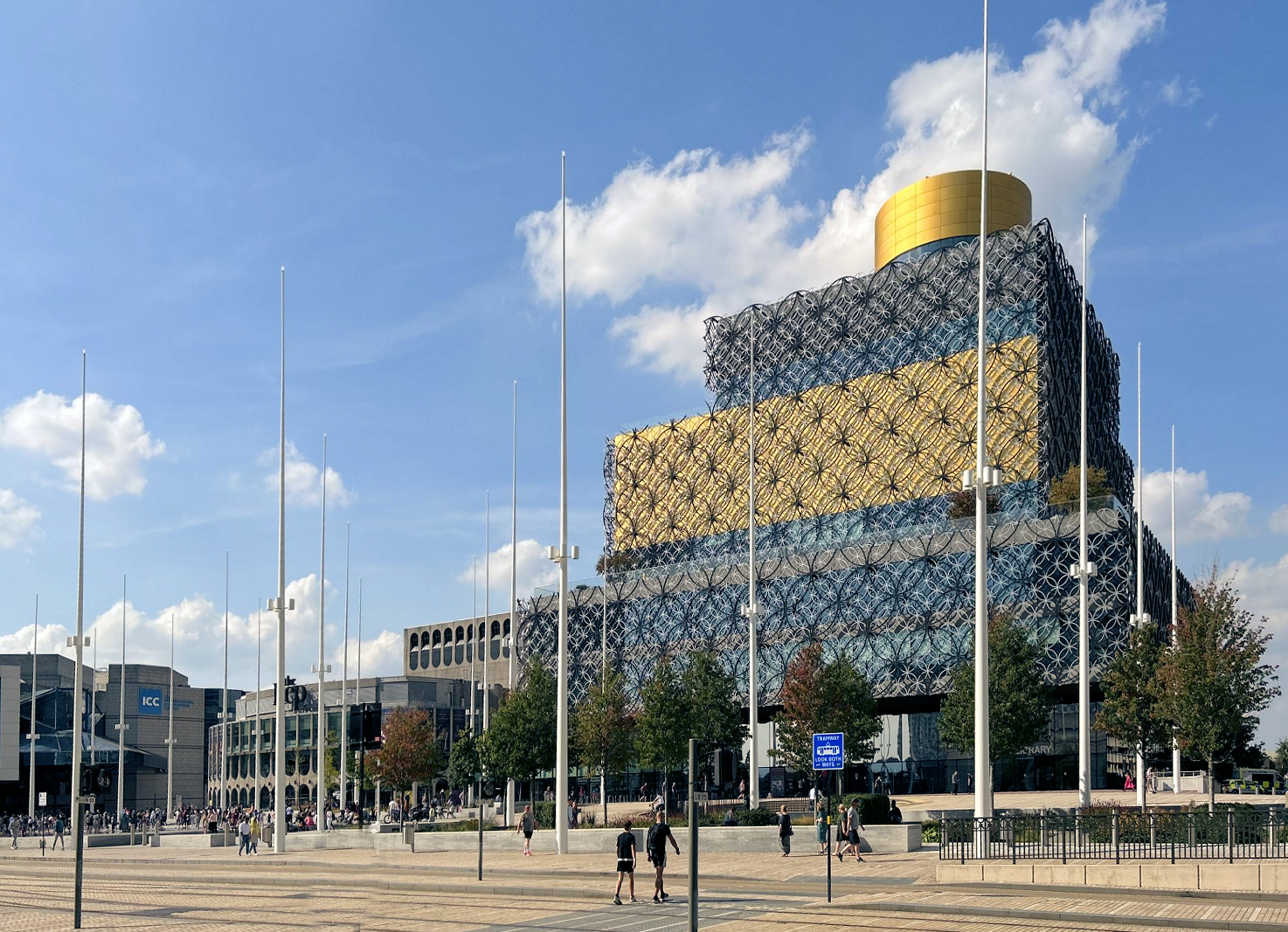
The Library of Birmingham is on Broad Street

In the 1970s and 1980s, Broad Street was still very much a suburban high street. However, one prescient early manifestation of the street's future purpose as a fashionable partying district was the Rum Runner nightclub, which from the late 1970s restyled itself after New York City's Studio 54 and later London's Blitz club. The club was best known as the original home base of major 1980s band Duran Duran. It was situated on the South side at the East end of the road from 1964 to 1987 when it was demolished.

During the 1990s, Broad Street was transformed into a dynamic convention, entertainment and nightlife quarter, centred on the International Convention Centre, which opened in 1991.

The Broad Street area is home to numerous bars and restaurants, the Brindleyplace development and cultural attractions such as the Ikon Gallery.

Three major radio stations - Free Radio, Capital Birmingham and Heart West Midlands - have their studios on the street. From 1969 to 1999 the area was a major national television production facility. The junction with Paradise Circus was home to the studios of former ITV companies ATV and Central; the studios (on the land between the Alpha Tower and the former Birmingham Municipal Bank) have since been demolished.

=== Traffic and transport ===
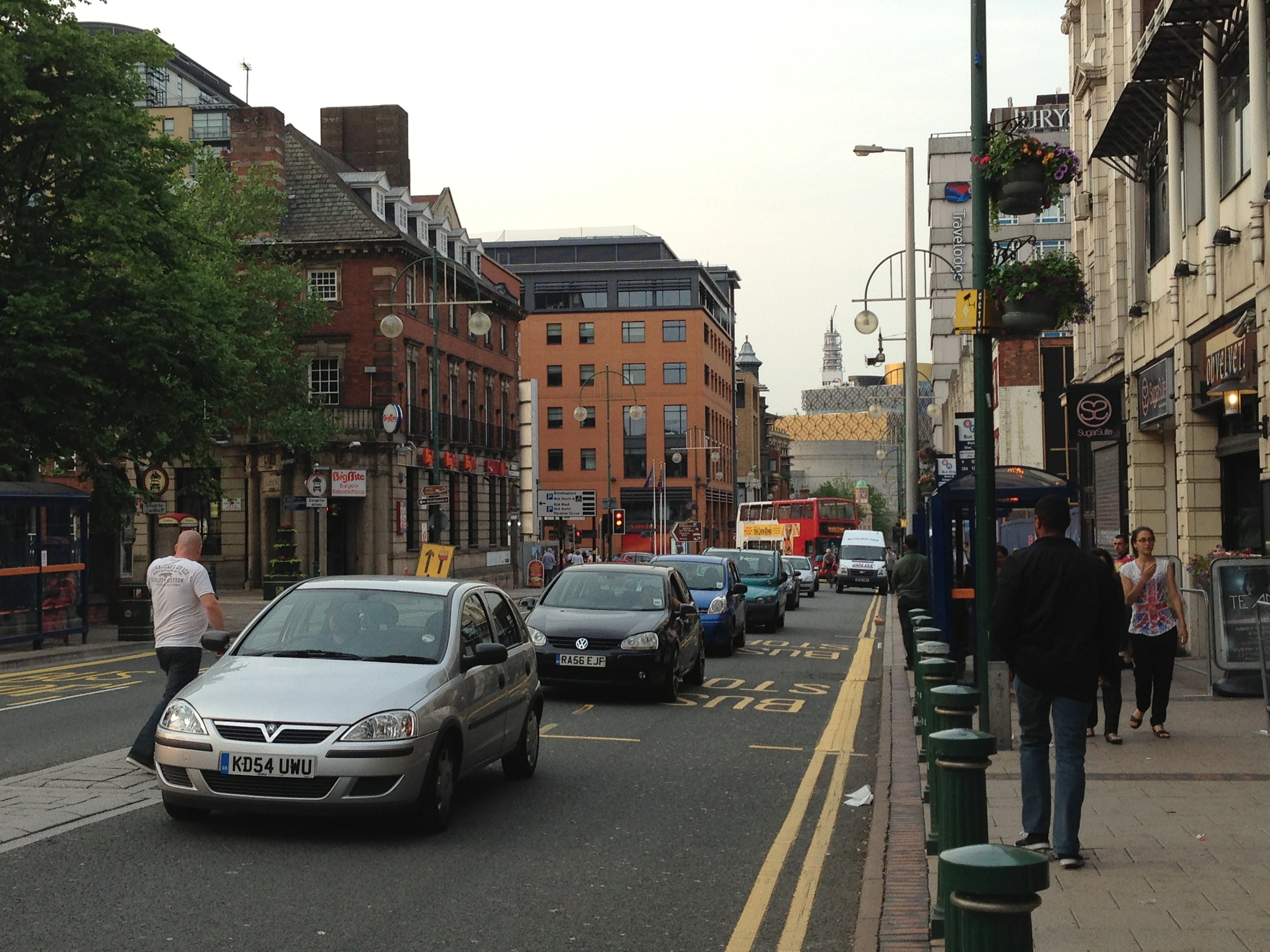
Traffic along Broad Street in July 2013

There is long standing concern over traffic congestion in the evenings when car drivers attracted by the nightlife are cruising the area. There was a proposal to ban cars during Friday and Saturday evenings and in 1998 there was a plan to ban cars every evening after 8.00 pm.

Broad Street is served by several West Midlands Bus routes. The road's only night bus service ceased in 2008.

The West Midlands Metro was extended along Broad Street to Five Ways between 2015 and 2019 with stops at Birmingham Library, Brindleyplace and Five Ways. The proposed SPRINT bus rapid transit route between Birmingham and Quinton would also serve Broad Street.

== Buildings and other structures ==
At its northern end is:

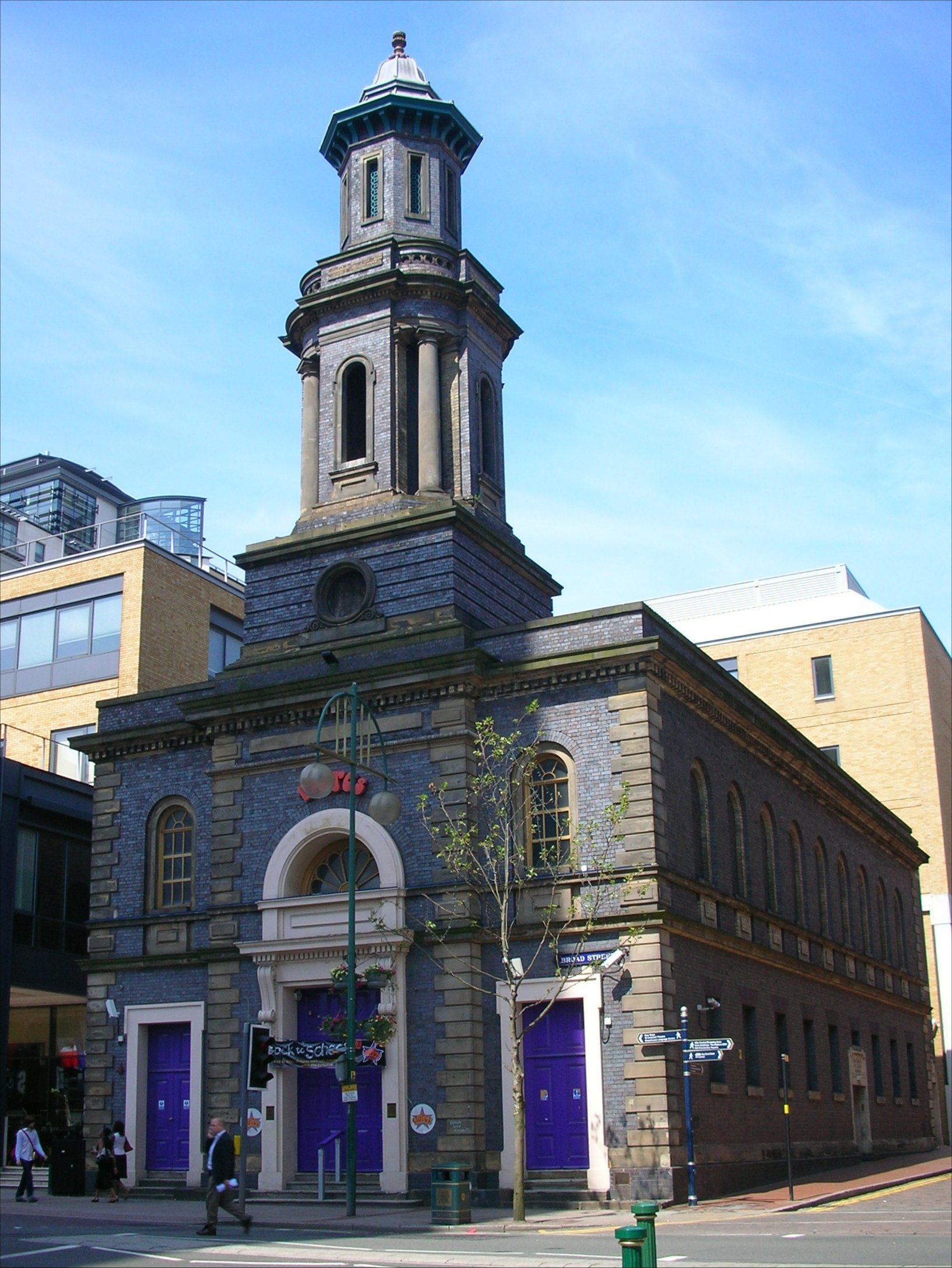
The former Second Church of Christ Scientist, now a nightclub

- Centenary Square, with
  - Baskerville House
  - Hall of Memory
  - Library of Birmingham
  - The old Masonic Hall, later Central Television – (demolished 2008)
  - The Birmingham Municipal Bank, the first municipal bank in the country, later Lloyds TSB, then bought by the council for redevelopment
  - The Boulton, Watt and Murdoch statue
  - The Birmingham Repertory Theatre
  - The International Convention Centre and Symphony Hall

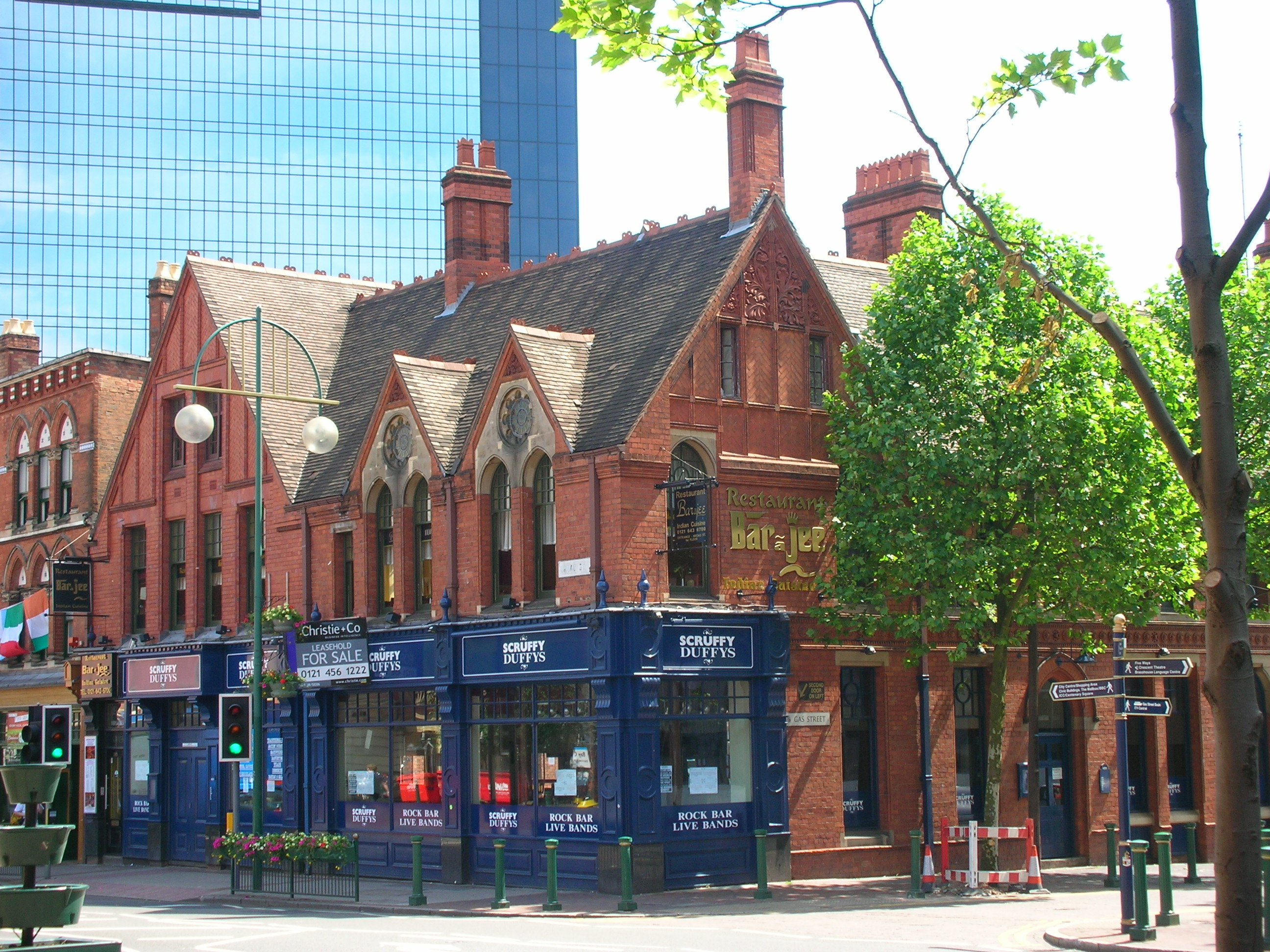
266 Broad Street, a listed Martin & Chamberlain building built over the canal tunnel

- The Crown Inn
- A tunnel (with a grade II listed Martin & Chamberlain building built on it) over the BCN Main Line canal leading to Gas Street Basin and Brindleyplace.
- Hyatt Regency Birmingham Hotel.
- Quayside Tower
- Jury's Inn hotel

The bridge crossing the Birmingham Canal was renamed the Black Sabbath Bridge in 2019, named after the rock group where all four members grew up in the local area. It includes a bench designed by fan Mohammed Osam, featuring avatars of the group members.

=== Walk of Stars ===
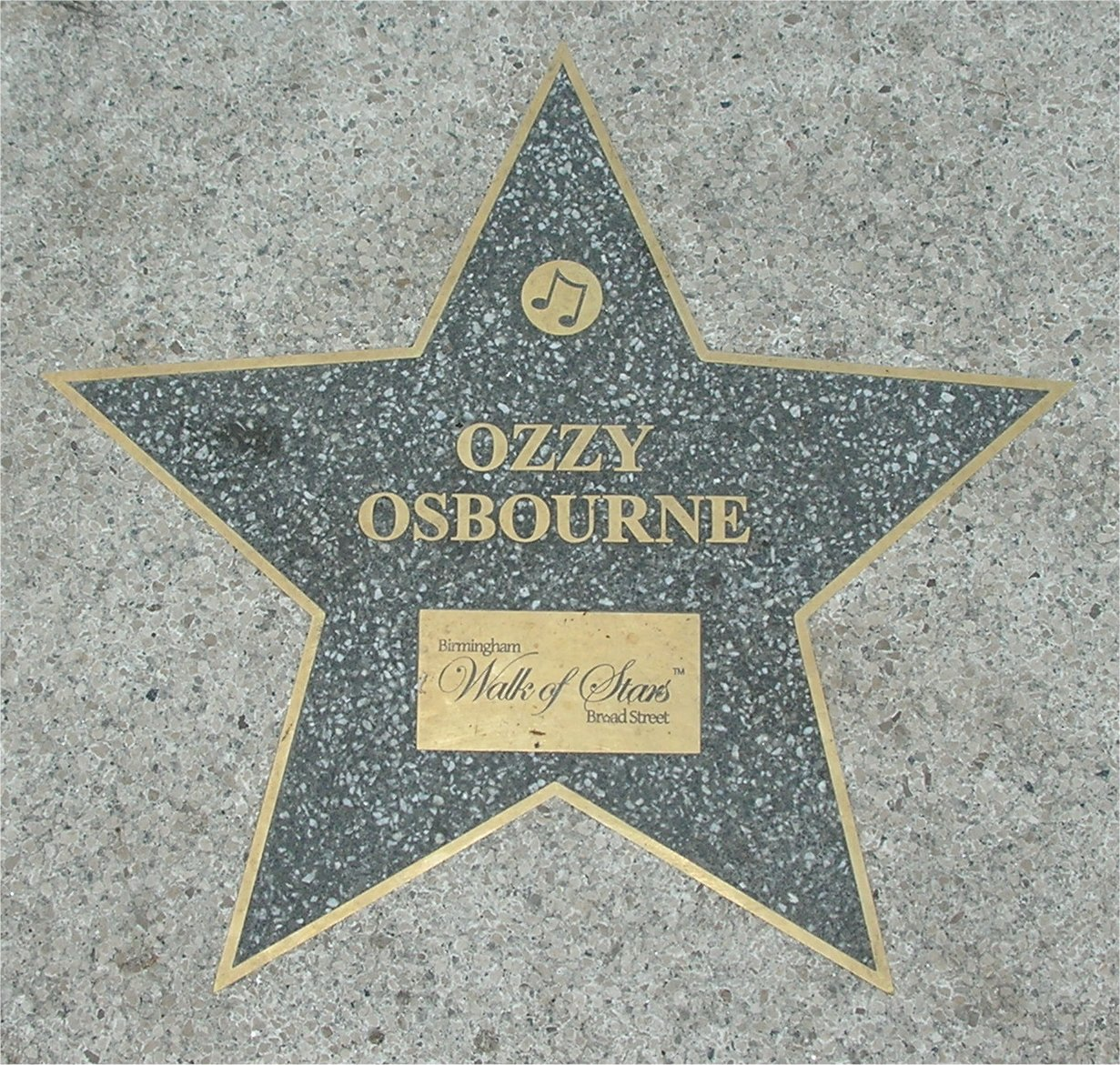
Star for Ozzy Osbourne on the canal bridge pavement

A 'Walk of Stars', similar to the Hollywood Walk of Fame, runs along the pavement on Broad Street. Ozzy Osbourne, of the Aston area of Birmingham, became the first person to be honoured when he had his brass star installed on 6 July 2007. Since then comedian Jasper Carrott, glam rocker Noddy Holder, motor racing commentator Murray Walker, the cast and crew of BBC Radio 4's The Archers, long serving Archers cast member Norman Painting and founding member of Black Sabbath, Tony Iommi have all been honoured on the street with a star. Other famous local people nominated to do the same include Frank Skinner, Cat Deeley and Duran Duran a group that at the start of the 1980s based themselves in the Rum Runner nightclub situated in Broad Street but which has subsequently been knocked down to make way for the Hyatt Hotel.

=== Future buildings ===
Developments planned for the street include Broad Street Tower, Regal Tower, V Building and a redevelopment of Five Ways Shopping Centre.

== See also ==
- Church of the Messiah, Birmingham
- Broad Street Presbyterian Church, Birmingham

== Other sources ==
- Brum and Brummies: Vol 2 (Chapter 3: 'The Old End' - "From Glebe Land to Working Class Heartland: The Bishopsgate Street Neighbourhood", Page 65), Carl Chinn, 2001, Brewin Books (ISBN 1-85858-202-4)
