= Emma Bache =

British-born novelist and graphologist (born 1963)

- Born: Emma Hutchinson; 1963 (age 62–63); West Midlands, UK
- Occupations: Graphologist, author
- Writing career
- Genre: non-fiction
- Website: emmabache.com

Emma Bache (born 1963) is a practising graphologist based in the UK.

== Early life ==
Emma Bache was born Emma Hutchinson in 1963 in The West Midlands. The youngest of three daughters, her father was William Hutchinson, a surgeon.

== Career ==
After studying Graphology at the Roehampton Institute and with a private tutor in Wales, Emma started her career working at various events and parties for event organisers and individuals before expanding into the media and corporate analyses.

Her career since 1989 has included writing a column for the business section of The Times Newspaper as well as The Financial Times.

She has made contributions analysing for The Daily Mail, The Mail on Sunday, The Independent and The Metro as well as TV, Sky TV's Premier League and radio appearances for both the BBC Radio 6 and independent channels.

She appeared as an expert on true crime documentaries such as Amazon Prime's Becoming Ian Brady and Confessions of a Murder Detective.

In September 2025, Emma appeared as an expert on Sky News in relation to the alleged signature of Donald Trump, which had been refuted by The White House Press Secretary Karoline Leavitt.

In February 2026, Emma spoke at World Governments Summit on critical thinking.

== Bibliography ==
In 2018, her first book Reading Between The Lines was published by Quercus.

In 2021, she was a contributor to From Women to the World published by Bloomsbury Press.

In 2026, The Journal of Parkinson's Disease published 'Handwriting patterns in isolated rapid eye movement behaviour disorder', which Emma was a contributor of.

- Reading Between The Lines ISBN 9781787470569
- From Women to the World ISBN 0755626850
- Journal of Parkinson's Disease: Handwriting patterns in isolated rapid eye movement behaviour disorder
