= Wilhelm Kümpel =

German painter and musician

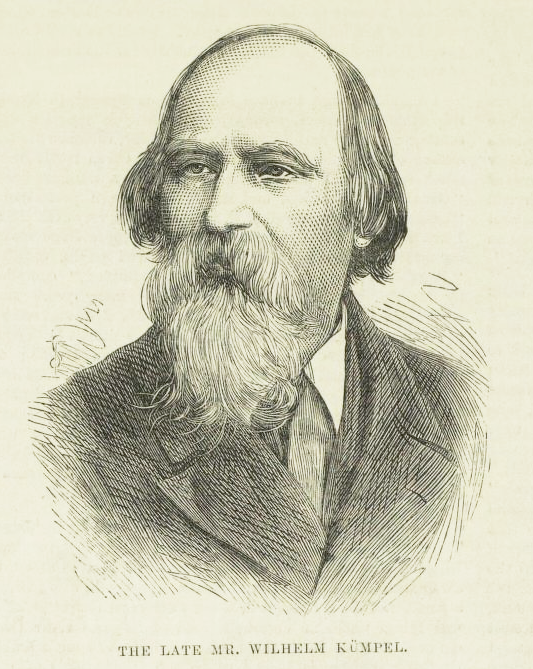

Wilhelm Kümpel (5 September 1822 – 17 April 1880) was a German-born artist and singer who moved to London. He was trained in the Düsseldorf Art Academy and specialized in portraits and landscapes and was also a tenor singer. A founding member of the German Athenaeum in London, he was involved, along with other German expatriates in raising funds for war widows of the Franco Prussian War of 1870. His art works on the theme of the New Forest also helped in making the beauty of the area more well-known and helped in legislative measures for the protection of the area in 1877.

== Life and work ==
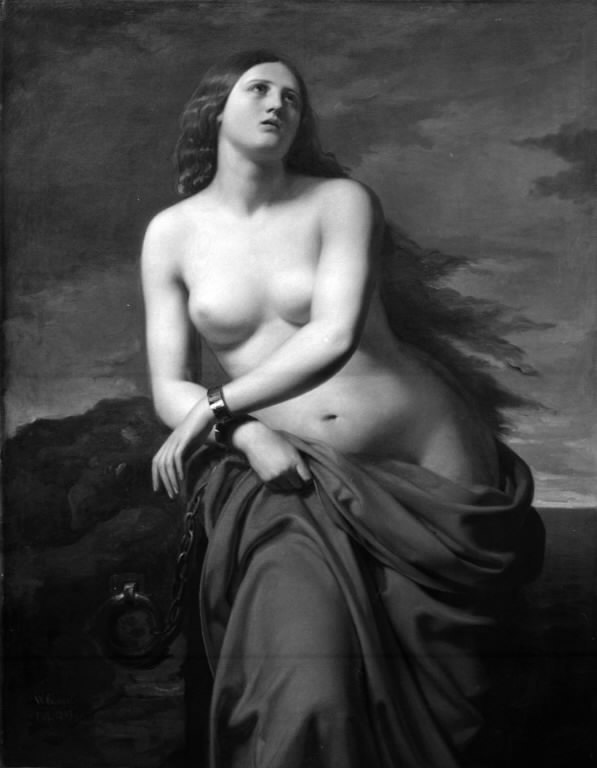
Andromeda chained to a rock (1847)

Kümpel was born in Altona, the son of a merchant, and was trained in the Düsseldorf Art Academy (1840-1844) under Karl Ferdinand Sohn. His singing talent was recognized by Capellmeister Krebs, of Dresden and he first performed as a solo tenor under the conductor Julius Rietz during the Lower Rhine Music Festival in May 1845 at Düsseldorf. His painting Andromeda chained to a rock was purchased by Christian VIII of Denmark who sought to make him a court painter. During the Schleswig-Holstein uprising of 1848 he was imprisoned in Copenhagen and he later moved out of Altona and went to live in London. He worked as an artist in London and sometimes also sang. He exhibited at the Royal Academy of Arts from 1857 to 1879. From 1869 he took a special interest in painting scenes from the New Forest and contributed to the New Forest Exhibition in 1876. The exhibition helped in the passing of the New Forest Act 1877.

As a tenor singer he performed in 1854, 1868 and 1869 at concerts. He gave a performance for the Working Men's Society in 1868, with "Walther's Song" from Richard Wagner's Die Meistersinger von Nürnberg.

Kümpel was a founding member of the German Athenaeum in London and was a close friend of Joseph Wolf and Carl Haag. In 1870, they held a charity painting event to raise funds for relatives of German soldiers lost in the Franco Prussian War. George E. J. Powell (1842–1882) commissioned several paintings by Kümpel.

He died from a heart ailment in London.
