= John Kentish (minister) =

English Unitarian minister

John Kentish (26 June 1768 – 6 March 1853) was an English Unitarian minister.

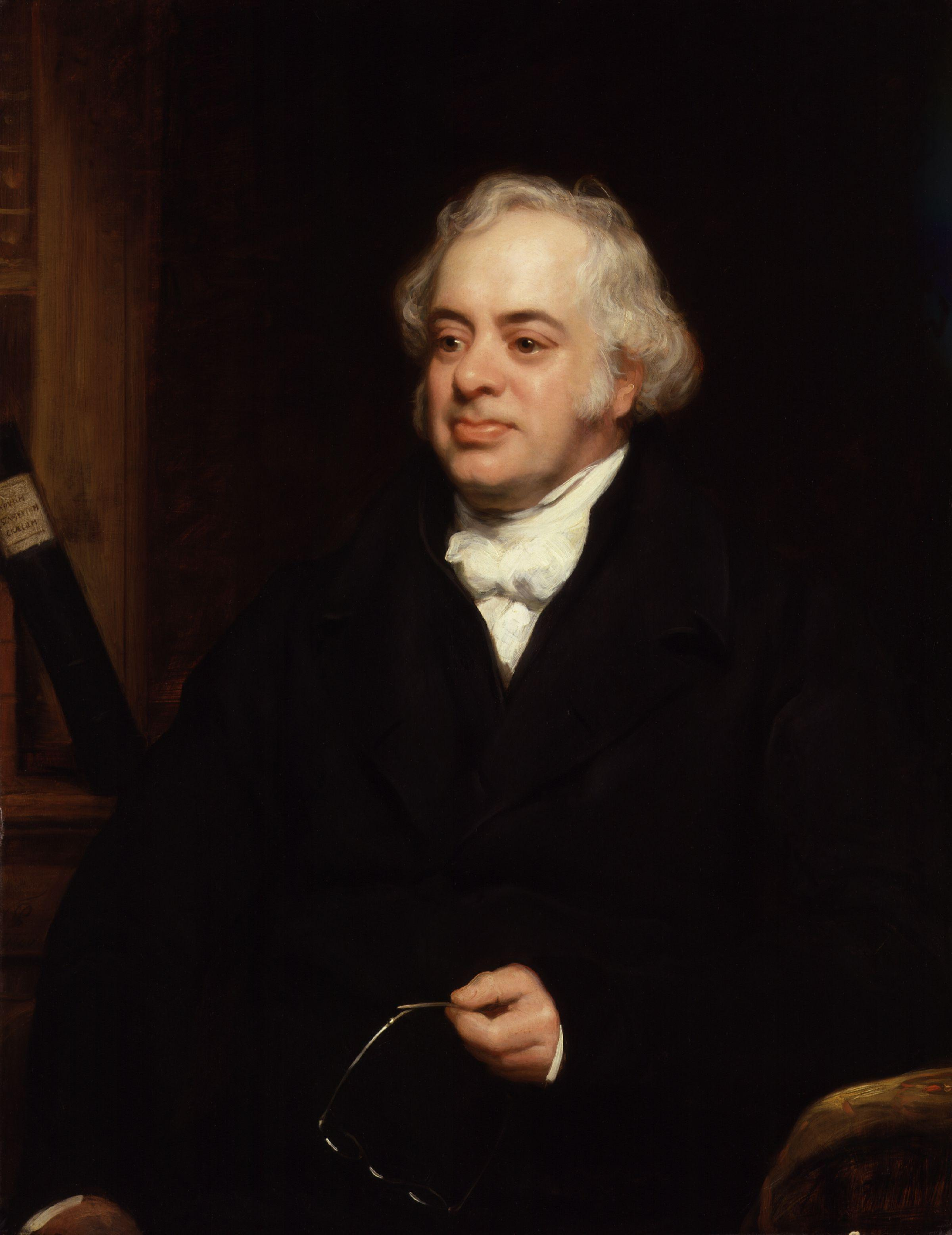
John Kentish, 1840 portrait by Thomas Phillips

== Life ==
Kentish was born at St Albans, Hertfordshire, on 26 June 1768. His father, at one time a draper, was the youngest son, and ultimately the heir, of Thomas Kentish, who in 1723 was High Sheriff of Hertfordshire. His mother was Hannah (d. 1793), daughter and heiress of Keaser Vanderplank.

After passing through the school of John Worsley at Hertford, he was entered in 1784 as a divinity student at Daventry Academy, under Thomas Belsham, William Broadbent, and Eliezer Cogan.

In September 1788 he moved, with two fellow students, to the New College at Hackney, a dissenting college, as a result of a prohibition by the Daventry trustees of any use of written prayers at the school.

In the autumn of 1790 he left Hackney to become the first minister of a newly formed Unitarian congregation at Plymouth Dock (now Devonport), Devonshire. A chapel was built in George Street (opened 27 April 1791 by Theophilus Lindsey, and a prayer-book drawn up by Kentish and Thomas Porter of Plymouth.

In 1794 he succeeded Porter as minister of the Treville Street congregation, Plymouth, after Porter emigrated to America.

That same year, Kentish wrote a scathing letter in which he decried the refusal of a trustee of George's Meeting house in Exeter to allow the Western Unitarian Society to hold their annual meeting there, allegedly based on religious prejudice. It was reprinted in 1800 with the name of the recipient and meetinghouse left out as a "Vindication of the Principles upon which Several Unitarians have Formed themselves into Societies," and gained wide distribution.

In 1795, he moved to London to serve as the afternoon preacher at the Gravel Pit, Hackney, adding to this office in 1802 that of morning preacher at St Thomas's Chapel, Southwark.

On 23 January 1803, he undertook the pastorate of the New Meeting in Birmingham, serving, from 1804-1815, alongside Joshua Toulmin. In 1832, Kentish declined his compensation, but retained the office of pastor, and continued to preach frequently through 1844.

Kentish died 6 March 1853, after a brief illness.

== Family ==
Kentish married, on 28 October 1805, Mary (21 March 1775 - 9 March 1864) his second cousin, the daughter of John Kettle of Birmingham, whose wife's sister was married to Kentish's uncle, Joshua Iremonger Kentish, of St Alban's. They had no children.

== Works ==
Kentish's sermons were published in 1848, and he was a frequent contributor to the Monthly Repository, a Unitarian periodical.

- The moral tendency of the genuine Christian Doctrine. London: J. Davis, 1796.
- Vindication of the Principles upon which Several Unitarians have Formed themselves into Societies. London: J. Davis, 1800
- The Situation and Duty of Protestant Dissenters. Birmingham: James Belcher and Son, 1829
- Sermons. Birmingham: James Belcher and Sons, 1848.
- Notes and Comments on Passages of Scripture. London: Simpkin, Marshall & Co., 1848.

On taking leave of his two congregations, Kentish preached and printed a sermon in both locations, "A Review of Christian Doctrine," which contained a summary of the principal topics of his preaching over his thirty-year pastorate.

William Sturch, who had attended one of the services, wrote a tract condemning Kentish's Preterist views, in which he was said to have "overstated" the fulfilment of Christ's prediction of the siege and destruction of Jerusalem, and under-stated the natural evidences of the immortality of man.
