= James Stimpson =

British organist

James Stimpson (29 February 1820 – 4 October 1886) was a British cathedral organist and Birmingham City Organist.

== Early life ==
He was born in Lincoln, England, on 29 February 1820, the son of William Stimpson and Rebecca Dannett. William was lay vicar of Lincoln Cathedral, who moved to Durham Cathedral in 1822, where James became a chorister in 1827.

He married Isabella Mary Clarissa Martin, only child of Mrs O. Branbury, and niece of Major Martin of Guernsey on 10 December 1841 in St George's Church, Southwark. She died on 22 February 1868.

He married secondly Sarah, daughter of John Herdman of Belfast at Fisherwick Place Church, Belfast on 5 January 1869. They had the following children:

- Elizabeth Stimpson (b. 14 January 1870)
- Sarah H. Stimpson (b. 1872)
- Catherine S.F. Stimpson (b. 1874)
- Revd. James Frederick Alexander Stimpson (1875-1936)
- Margaret F. Stimpson (b. 1876)

== Career ==
In February 1834, he was articled to Richard Ingham, organist of Carlisle Cathedral; in June 1836 was appointed organist of St Andrew's Church, Newcastle upon Tyne; and in June 1841, on Ingham's death, was made organist of Carlisle.

In February 1842, he was chosen organist at Birmingham Town Hall and St Paul's Church, Birmingham, and in the following year founded the Festival Choral Society. He continued with the Society until 1855.

In 1844, he was instrumental in starting the weekly Monday Evening Concerts.

He was organist of St Martin in the Bull Ring, Birmingham, from 1852 to 1857.

== Death ==
He died in Birmingham on 4 October 1886.
