= List of dissenting academies (1660–1800) =

This is a list of dissenting academies, English and Welsh educational institutions run by Dissenters to provide an education, and often a vocational training as a minister of religion, outside the Church of England. It runs from the English Restoration of 1660, which created a parallel educational system as a side-effect, to the end of the 18th century. (Note: This list includes the academies (except where otherwise noted) from the first appendix to Irene Parker, Dissenting Academies in England (1914), a work in the public domain. The author comments that Quaker establishments were excluded from her listing. The notes refer to the Dictionary of National Biography (DNB), and its successor the Oxford Dictionary of National Biography (ODNB), to reference and cross-check. Some of the information about dates is uncertain, and details about students are sometimes contentious. The "Surman Index" links are to lists of Congregational ministers trained in academies, made available by The Surman Index Online, Dr Williams's Centre for Dissenting Studies)

== East Anglia ==
Institution	Dates	Tutors	Students
Ipswich	1698–1734(?)	John Langton or Langston (d. 1704)	
Palgrave Academy, Suffolk	1775–1785 under Anna Laetitia Barbauld and her husband Rochemont	Rochemont Barbauld	Arthur Aikin, Charles Rochemont Aikin, Thomas Denman, Basil William Douglas, Thomas Douglas, William Gell, Henri de La Fite, Frank Sayers, William Taylor, Isaac Weld
Saffron Walden	1680-(?)	John or William Payne, assisted by the Fund Board when it was first started	John Guyse
Wickhambrook	1670–1696(?) (when tutor removed to Bishop's Stortford)	Samuel Cradock	Edmund Calamy, Timothy Goodwin

== London area ==
Institution	Dates	Tutors	Students
Bethnal Green, migratory (Highgate, Clerkenwell)	1680(?)–1696(?)	Thomas Brand with John Kerr, M.D.	Charles Owen, Samuel Palmer, John Ward
Cheshunt, then Higham Hill, Walthamstow	1790–1816	Eliezer Cogan	Benjamin Disraeli, Russell Gurney, Samuel Sharpe
Cheshunt College, moved to Cheshunt from Trefeca	1792–1906 (in 1906 moved to Cheshunt College, Cambridge)	William Hendry Stowell (president 1850), Henry Robert Reynolds (president 1860–94)	John Abbs, Henry Allon
New College at Hackney	1786–1796	Andrew Kippis	William Shepherd
Highbury College (not in Parker)			
Hoxton Square, moved to Hoxton Square from Coventry	1700–1729(?)	Joshua Oldfield, John Spademan, William Lorimer, Jean Cappel	Nathaniel Lardner
Islington (1)	1672–1680	Ralph Button	Joseph Jekyll, Samuel Pomfret
Islington (2) Migratory (Woodford Bridge, Essex (plague), Battersea, Wimbledon, etc.).	1672–1707(?)	Thomas Doolittle, assisted by Thomas Vincent, Thomas Rowe (?)	Samuel Bury, Edmund Calamy, Thomas Emlyn, John Kerr, M.D. (later tutor, Highgate and Bethnal Green), Matthew Henry
Mill Hill	(?)–1701(?)	Richard Swift (d. 1701), active at Edgware	
Tenter Alley, Moorfields (not in Parker)	1710	John Ward, from 1734 Isaac Kimber and Edward Sandercock, but it closed quite soon after	Samuel Dyer, Isaac Kimber
Newington Green (1) Migratory (Little Britain, Clapham)	1665(?)–c.1706	Theophilus Gale, M.A., Fellow of Magdalen College, Oxford (d. 1678), Thomas Rowe (d. 1706)	Thomas and Benoni Rowe, John Ashford; Isaac Watts, John Evans, Daniel Neal, Henry Grove (later tutor at Taunton), John Hughes, Josiah Hort, Samuel Say
Newington Green (2)	1667 (?) to about 1706	Charles Morton, who in 1685 went to New England, and was succeeded by Stephen Lobb; William Wickens, Francis Glasscock.	William Hocker, Samuel Lawrence, Thomas Reynolds, John Shower, under Morton; Joseph Hussey under Morton; also Daniel Defoe, Samuel Wesley, Kitt, Butterby, William Jenkyn
The King's Head Society academies (1731–1769) included Samuel Parsons's Academy, Clerkenwell Green (1731–35); Abraham Taylor Gib's Academy, Deptford (1735–40); Stepney Academy (1740–44); (tutors: John Hubbard (1740–1743)); Zephaniah Marryat (1743–1744); John Walker (1742–1744) Plaisterer's Hall Academy (1744–54) (Tutors: Walker, Marryatt, John Conder and Thomas Gibbons); Mile End Academy (1754–69) (Tutors: Condor, Gibbons & Walker); The King's Head Society purchase of the estate at Homerton in 1768, with the students in residence by the end of 1769. The name of the institution changed over time; known as Homerton Academy and Independent College, Homerton. In 1850 the union of Homerton, Coward and Highbury Colleges resulted in the creation of New College London.	1730–1744–1850	Abraham Taylor, Samuel Parsons, John Hubbard after 1744, Zephaniah Marryat (d. 1754), Hubbard and Marryat were strict Calvinists; D.D., John Conder who became head at Homerton.	Thomas Williams at Plasterers' Hall, under Zephaniah Marryat; Robert Robinson under Marryat; Thomas Marryat; Conder under Parsons at Clerkenwell; Thomas Cogan under Conder; John Stafford and John Fell under Conder at Mile End; Samuel Pike under Hubbard at Stepney; Ezekiel Blomfield at Homerton Academy, under Daniel Fisher.
Wapping	1675(?)–1680/81	Edward Veal. The DNB states that his congregation was at Wapping, but the academy was at Stepney.	Joseph Boyse, Timothy Rogers, John Shower, Samuel Wesley
Wellclose Square (Coward Trust), largely supported by the bequest of William Coward d. 1738, moved to Hoxton Square in 1762.	1744–1785	Samuel Morton Savage, David Jennings, Andrew Kippis, Abraham Rees.	Thomas Cogan, Philip Furneaux, Thomas Jervis, Abraham Rees, Joshua Toulmin, William Wood
London (various parts), supported by Fund Board. Migratory (Pinner, Moorfields: see Newington Green).	1696–1744	Thomas Goodwin, Isaac Chauncy, Thomas Ridgley, D.D., John Eames, Joseph Densham.	John Conder under Ridgley and Eames at Moorfields; John Howard, David Jennings, Samuel Pike, David Williams, all under Eames.
London. 'A less literary seminary but it continued only for a few years.'	1760-(?)	Samuel Pike	

== Midlands ==
Institution	Dates	Tutors	Students
Alcester	(?)–1720(?)	Joseph Porter, on whose death (1721) students were moved to Stratford-on-Avon.	
Bedworth	1690-(?)	Julius Saunders and John Kirkpatrick	
Bridgnorth	1726–1735(?)	John Fleming, who moved to Stratford-on-Avon when John Alexander went to Dublin.	Edward Pickard
Bromsgrove (or Stourbridge)	1665–1692(?)	Henry Hickman, B.D., Fellow of Magdalen, Oxford (d. 1692).	Thomas Cotton
Coventry	1663–1700 (moved 1700 to London by Joshua Oldfield)	John Bryan (d. 1675), Obadiah Grew (d. 1689), Thomas Shewell, M.A. (d. 1693), Joshua Oldfield, assisted by William Tong	Samuel Pomfret
Findern, afterwards at Derby	(?)–1754	Thomas Hill (d. 1720), Ebenezer Latham (d. 1754)	
Lincoln	1668–1680	Edward Reyner, but d. c.1660	John Disney
Market Harborough, moved to Mile End	From 1758 to 1781, boarding pupils	Stephen Addington, after John Aikin left the area	
Nettlebed (Oxfordshire)	1666–1697	Thomas Cole, M.A. (Christ Church, Oxford)	John Locke was a student of Cole's, but before his ejectment. James Bonnell was at Nettlebed
Newport Pagnell, merged in Cheshunt (?)	1783	William Bull, J. Bull, M.A., J. Watson, W. Foggart	John Leach (judge). Samuel Greatheed
Northampton (see Daventry Academy for continuity). Migratory, it started at Kibworth under John Jennings, moved to Hinckley, Market Harborough under Philip Doddridge, and in 1729 to Northampton After 1752 to Daventry, back to Northampton, Wymondley, Byng Place, and 1850 merged into New College, London	1715(?)	John Jennings (d. 1723), Philip Doddridge, Caleb Ashworth, Thomas Robins, Thomas Belsham, John Horsey in Northampton, William Parry in Wymondley.	John Cope and John Mason under Jennings; Stephen Addington, Philip Holland (with brothers John and Henry) and Andrew Kippis under Doddridge; John Stafford under Doddridge at Northampton; Benjamin Fawcett under Doddridge; Samuel Dyer; Henry Moore under Doddridge and Ashworth; Samuel Palmer under Ashworth; John Alexander, Eliezer Cogan, who became a tutor; Timothy Kenrick under Ashworth and Robins, became a tutor under Belsham. William Stevenson from 1787. William Shepherd under Belsham. John Curwen, David Everard Ford, Edward Miall, John Deodatus Gregory Pike at Wymondley College
Nottingham	1680-(?)	Edward Reynolds and John Whitlock. John Hardy (?Thomas; perhaps not the academy in Parker), about 1714 to 1727	Caleb Fleming, John Brekell, John Johnson (Lambeth librarian) under Hardy.
Sheriffhales	1663–1697 (closed before Woodhouse went to London)	John Woodhouse, assisted by Southwell	Robert Harley (?), Henry St John (?), Thomas Foley, Thomas Hunt, Benjamin Bennet.
Shrewsbury	1663–1730(?)	Francis Tallents (d. 1708), John Bryan (?) (d. 1699), James Owen (d. 1706), Samuel Benion, M.A. (d. 1708), John Reynolds (d. 1727), Dr Gyles (d. 1730?).	(Under Benion), Ebenezer Latham (tutor at Findern), etc.
Stratford-on-Avon	1715 (?) at Gloucester (?)	John Alexander, who 1729 went to Dublin; John Fleming, who had begun an academy at Bridgnorth (1726–1727), then went to Stratford	
Sulby, near Welford, Northampton	1680–1688	John Shuttlewood	Matthew Clarke the younger, Thomas Emlyn, Joshua Oldfield, and John Sheffield.
Whitchurch	1668–1680(?)	J. Maulden (d. 1680)	

== North ==
Institution	Dates	Tutors	Students
Attercliffe Academy	1691–1744	Timothy Jollie (d. 1714), John De la Rose, J. Wadsworth (?)	Nicholas Saunderson, John Jennings of Kibworth Academy, John Bowes and Thomas Secker, Samuel Price, John Barker, Thomas Bradbury, Samuel Wright, Benjamin Grosvenor, William Harris, Joseph Mottershead who then studied under Matthew Henry.
Bolton	1723–1729	John Barclay, M.A.	
Heckmondwyke, merged in Rotherham College	1756	James Scott (d. 1783), Samuel Walker, etc. Walker then taught at Northowram, to 1795.	Timothy Priestley under Scott; William Vint under Walker at Northowram. Benjamin Boothroyd at Northowram.
Kendal, set up after the death of Thomas Dixon (Whitehaven)	1733–1752	Caleb Rotherham	About 120 lay students in all; Jeremiah Dyson, George Walker; Thomas and Benjamin Dawson; Robert Andrews (translator), John Seddon.
Manchester	1698–1710(?)	John Chorlton (d. 1705) transferred Rathmell Academy to Manchester after Frankland died, countenanced by and promised support from the Lancashire ministers; James Coningham, from 1700.	Samuel Bourn the younger, James Clegg, Thomas Dixon, Thomas Holland
Rathmell Academy. Migratory (Natland, Kendal, Attercliffe by 1686, etc.)	1669–1698	Richard Frankland, assisted by John Issot	John Ashe, Joshua Bayes, John Chorlton, James Clegg, John Owen, Timothy Jollie (tutor at Attercliffe), John Evans; Christopher Bassnett; Richard Chorley
Warrington	1700–1746	Charles Owen, D.D. (d. 1746)	
Warrington Academy	1757–1783. Library moved to Manchester New College, 1783; other removals, York (1803), Manchester, London, now represented by Harris Manchester College, Oxford	John Taylor, John Aikin, John Holt, Joseph Priestley, William Enfield, Nicholas Clayton, etc.; at Manchester, Thomas Barnes, George Walker, John Dalton, Ralph Harrison, etc.; and at York, Charles Wellbeloved, Hugh Kerr, M.A., etc.	
Whitehaven, moved to Bolton 1723–1729(?)	1710–1723	Thomas Dixon	John Taylor, George Benson, Caleb Rotherham, Henry Winder

== South ==
Institution	Dates	Tutors	Students
Gosport	1777–1826	David Bogue. In 1800 the London Missionary Society placed their missionaries under Bogue for preparation.	
Hungerford	1696–1701(?)	Benjamin Robinson, educated at Sheriffhales, first set up a school at Findern in 1693 but was opposed there (d. 1724)	
Tubney, Berkshire	1668–1679	Henry Langley (d. 1679)	

== South-West ==
Institution	Dates	Tutors	Students
Bridgwater	(?)–1747	John Moore, M.A. (d. 1747)	
Bristol. First Baptist Academy	1720–(?)	Bernard Foskett, continued the work of Ed. Terril and Caleb Tope. He was succeeded by Hugh Evans and his son Caleb Evans.	John Ash
Bristol, St. Michael's Hill (not in Parker, became Unitarian and drew pupils of all kinds)	1736, Estlin d. 1817	William Foot, John Prior Estlin	John Bishop Estlin, Richard Bright, John Cam Hobhouse, James Stephen
Dartmouth	1668–1691	John Flavel	Only four
Exeter	(About) 1700–1722	Joseph Hallet II, perhaps started in 1690. Academy declined and was closed because of a subscription quarrel.	James Foster, John Fox, Peter King, Zachariah Mudge
Exeter	1760–1786	Samuel Merivale, Michaijah Towgood, John Turner, John Hogg, Thomas Jervis	
Exeter	1799–1805	Timothy Kenrick, Joseph Bretland	James Hews Bransby
Gloucester	1696-(?)	James Forbes (d. 1712)	
Lyme Regis or Colyton, moved to Shepton Mallet and then to Poole	1690	John Short, Matthew Towgood (fl. 1710–1746)	
Newton Abbot (not in Parker)	1699–1712	Boarding school kept by Isaac Gilling	John Huxham
Ottery St Mary, started by Congregational Board, later represented by Bristol. Migratory (Bridport, Taunton, Exeter, Plymouth, Bristol)	1752-(?)	John Lavington, James Rooker, Thomas Reader, James Small, etc.	
Taunton	1672–1759 (when Amory went to London)	Matthew Warren, Robert Darch, Stephen James, Henry Grove, Thomas Amory	Henry Grove, John Shower under Warren; William Harris under Amory and Grove Thomas and John Wright of Bristol, etc.
Taunton (not in Parker)	c.1677 to Monmouth's Rebellion	George Hamond	Isaac Gilling
Tewkesbury Academy 1680 (Gloucester) to 1719, moved to Tewkesbury in 1712		Samuel Jones (d. 1719 or 1720), Jeremiah Jones his nephew	Thomas Secker, Samuel Chandler, Joseph Butler. Daniel Scott. Andrew Gifford.
Tiverton	(?)-(?)	John Moor (d. 1740)	

== Wales ==
Institution	Dates	Tutors	Students
Broad Oak, Flintshire	1690–1706	Philip Henry. After Henry's death, 1696, Benion continued teaching till in 1706, after the death of James Owen, he moved to Shrewsbury.	Samuel Benion, who became a tutor. Ebenezer Latham studied under Benion, became a tutor at Caldwell, and later succeeded Hill at Findern. Samuel Lawrence studied under Henry.
Brynllywarch, Llangynwyd, near Bridgend, Glamorgan	1668–1697(?)	Samuel Jones	James Owen (tutor, Shrewsbury), Philip Pugh
Abergavenny. The Congregational Board withdrew their funding from Carmarthen Academy after an internal split, in 1756, and established one of their own. Migratory (Oswestry, Wrexham, Llanfyllin, Newton), Brecon College after 1839. The Baptist college founded 1807 is unconnected.	1757-(?)	David Jardine (d. 1766), Benjamin Davies, D.D. (d. 1817), John Griffiths, Edward Williams merged in his own school and pressed for the 1782 move to Oswestry, Jenkin Lewis, George Lewis, D.D. (d. 1822), etc.	Noah Simmons
Carmarthen (Presbyterian College, Carmarthen; Coleg Presbyteraidd Caerfyrddin). Migratory (Llwynllwyd, Haverford West, etc., Carmarthen, and probably continuation of Brynllwarch). Carmarthen absorbed other academies including Vavasor Griffiths's Academy (1735–1741) at Chancefield near Talgarth. in 1733/34 the Presbyterian board invited Griffiths to succeed Thomas Perrott at Carmarthen Academy.	1700–after 1900	William Evans (d. 1718), Thomas Perrot (under whom were about 150 pupils) (d. 1733), Vavasor Griffiths, Evans Davis, Robert Gentleman (1779–1784). George Vance Smith, principal 1876 to 1888, Walter Jenkin Evans principal 1888 to 1910.	Euros Bowen, David Davis, John Jenkins (Ifor Ceri), Thomas Rees, David Williams, David Williams (1709–1784)
Knill, Radnorshire	(?) 1675-(?)	John Weaver	Samuel Jones, later tutor at Tewkesbury Academy

== See also ==
- List of dissenting academies (19th century)
- Category:Dissenting academy tutors
