= John Seddon of Warrington =

English Dissenter and rector of Warrington Academy

John Seddon (1725–1770) was an English Dissenter and rector of Warrington Academy.

== Life ==
The son of Peter Seddon, dissenting minister successively at Ormskirk and Hereford, he was born at Hereford on 8 December 1725. The Unitarian John Seddon (1719–1769), with whom he has often been confused, is said to have been a second cousin. He was entered at Kendal Academy in 1742, under Caleb Rotheram, and went on to Glasgow University, where he matriculated in 1744, and was a favourite pupil of Francis Hutcheson and William Leechman. On completing his studies he succeeded Charles Owen, D.D., as minister of Cairo Street Chapel, Warrington, Lancashire, where he was ordained on 8 December 1747. He served there until his death. Soon after his settlement the Percival family left the established church and attached themselves to Seddon, thought to be a liberal divine of Arian views. Seddon gave private tuition to Thomas Percival.

After the closure of the private academies at Kendal (1753) and Findern, Derbyshire (1754), a project was launched in July 1754 for establishing in the north of England a dissenting academy by subscription. Seddon was one of the most active promoters of the scheme; it was due to him that the final choice fell upon Warrington rather than upon Ormskirk. On 30 June 1757 he was elected secretary, and when the academy opened at Warrington on 20 Oct. he was appointed librarian. As secretary he did not get on well with John Taylor, who had been appointed to the divinity chair; the trustees, however, sided with Seddon against Taylor. Discipline was always a difficulty at Warrington; with a view to better control, in 1767 the office of ‘rector academiæ’ was created, and bestowed upon Seddon. At the same time he succeeded Joseph Priestley in the chair of belles lettres; his manuscript lectures on the philosophy of language and on oratory, in four quarto volumes, were preserved in the library of Manchester College, Oxford.

Taylor's difference with Seddon originated in a controversy respecting forms of prayer. On 3 July 1750 a meeting of dissenting ministers took place at Warrington to consider the introduction of ‘public forms’ into dissenting worship. A subsequent meeting at Preston on 10 September 1751 declared in favour of ‘a proper variety of public devotional offices.’ Next year the ‘provincial assembly’ appointed a committee on the subject; a long controversy followed. On 16 October 1760 a number of persons in Liverpool, headed by Thomas Bentley, agreed to build a chapel for nonconformist liturgical worship, and invited several dissenting ministers to prepare a prayer-book. Taylor declined, and wrote strongly against the scheme. Seddon warmly took it up. On 6 January 1762 he submitted ‘the new liturgy’ to a company of dissenters at the Merchants' coffee-house, Liverpool. This compilation, published 1763, as A Form of Prayer and a New Collection of Psalms, for the use of a congregation of Protestant Dissenters in Liverpool, is often described as Seddon's work; he edited it, but had two coadjutors; of its three services, the third was by Philip Holland; the remaining contributor was Richard Godwin (1722–1787), minister at Gateacre, near Liverpool. The book was used in the Octagon Chapel, Liverpool, from its opening on 5 June 1763 till 25 February 1776, after which the building was sold, and converted into St. Catherine's Church. Seddon declined to become the minister of the Octagon Chapel, and in his own ministry practised extemporary prayer.

Seddon was a main founder (1758) of the Warrington public library, and its first president. He was the first secretary (1764) of the Lancashire and Cheshire Widows' Fund.

He died suddenly at Warrington on 23 January 1770, and was buried in Cairo Street Chapel.

== Family ==
In 1757 he married Elizabeth Hoskins. Her father was equerry to Frederick, prince of Wales. They had no children. His wife's fortune was invested in calico-printing works at Stockport, and lost. She survived him.

== Legacy ==
A selection from his letters and papers was edited by Robert Brook Aspland, in the Christian Reformer (1854 pp. 224 sq., 358 sq., 613 sq., 1855 pp. 365 sq.).

His papers are held at Harris Manchester College, Oxford.
