= Eliezer Cogan =

English scholar and divine

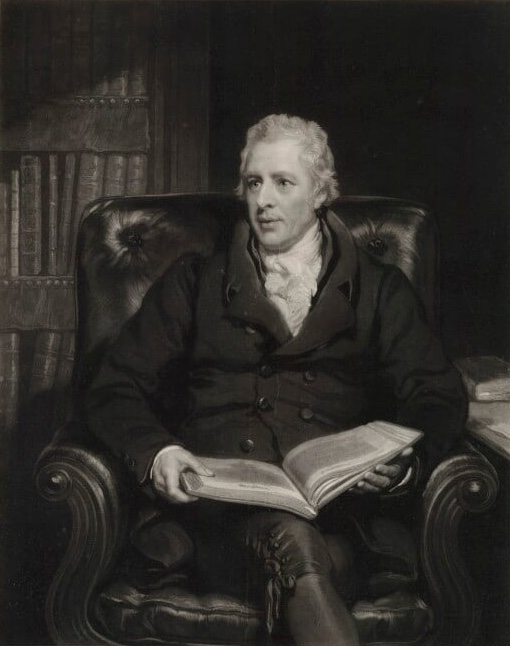
1828 portrait by Samuel Cousins, after Thomas Phillips mezzotint

Eliezer Cogan (1762 – 21 January 1855), was an English scholar and divine.

== Life ==
Cogan was born at Rothwell, Northamptonshire, the son of John Cogan, a surgeon. His father, who died in 1784, and was the author of An Essay on the Epistle to the Romans and of other anonymous pieces, married twice; by his first wife he had a son Thomas Cogan the physician, and by the second he was the father of Eliezer. The boy studied Latin grammar before he was six years old. For six months he was placed at Market Harborough in the school of Stephen Addington, but his early life was mainly passed under his father's roof, and he was self-taught in the rudiments of Greek.

To complete his education, he was sent to Daventry Academy, where he studied for six years, three as pupil and three as assistant tutor, under Thomas Belsham. At this time there were about 50 pupils, many known in later life as Unitarians. When John Kenrick moved from Daventry to Exeter in 1784, his place was taken by Cogan, who thus became Belsham's colleague. In the autumn of 1787 Cogan was elected as minister of Presbyterian congregation at Cirencester, and continued in that position until 1789. During this period of his life he printed for his friends, though he did not publish, a Fragment on Philosophical Necessity.

On 21 September 1790 he married Mary, the daughter of David Atchison of Weedon, and in the following July he settled for a short time at Ware in Hertfordshire, but after a few months he moved first to Enfield and then to Cheshunt. Cogan was elected minister of the chapel in Crossbrook Street, Cheshunt, in 1800, and in January of the following year he was also appointed by the dissenting congregation at Walthamstow. During that year he preached alternately there and at Cheshunt, but then he transferred his school from Cheshunt to Higham Hill, Walthamstow, and ministered only to the congregation there.

His school soon became known, and among his pupils were Samuel Sharpe, the Egyptologist and translator of the Bible, Benjamin Disraeli (of whom he used to say, "I don't like Disraeli; I never could get him to understand the subjunctive"), Milner Gibson, Russell Gurney, Lord Stone, art collector Henry Vaughan, inventor Sir Francis Ronalds, and Peter Finch Martineau's sons. He preached his farewell sermon at Walthamstow on the last Sunday 1816, and in 1828 retired from teaching into private life. His portrait in life-size was painted at the cost of his pupils by Thomas Phillips, R.A., and engraved by Samuel Cousins, and the picture was presented to him at a dinner at the Albion tavern on 20 December 1828.

He died at Higham Hill on 21 January 1855, and was buried on 27 January in a vault in the burial-ground at the Gravel Pit Chapel, Hackney, which contained his wife's remains. She died on 1 December 1850, aged 81.

== Works ==
Cogan had a reputation as a Greek scholar. In the section of Porsoniana appended to Alexander Dyce's Table-talk of Samuel Rogers, p. 302, occurs the anecdote that when Richard Porson was introduced to Cogan with the remark that he was intensely devoted to Greek, Porson's reply was, "If Mr. Cogan is passionately fond of Greek, he must be content to dine on bread and cheese for the remainder of his life." William Parr praised Cogan's "intellectual powers, his literary attainments, and candour", and in 1821 stated that he had given directions that on his death a ring should be presented to Cogan. Joseph Priestley was his guide in theology and metaphysics. His works were numerous.

Besides the Fragment on Philosophical Necessity, Cogan wrote:

- An Address to the Dissenters on Classical Literature, 1789, in which he urged the study of the classics.
- Moschi Idyllia tria, Græce, 1795, which he edited with notes for the use of his scholars, but afterwards suppressed.
- Reflections on the Evidences of Christianity, 1796.
- Purity and Perfection of Christian Morality, 1800.
- Christianity and Atheism compared, 1800. To this an answer was issued by a Mr. Robinson, whereupon Cogan published An Examination of Mr. Robinson's reply to Mr. Cogan on the Practical Influence of a belief in a Future State, 1800.
- Sermons Chiefly on Practical Subjects, 1817, 2 vols.
- Contributions to the Monthly Magazine, Dr. Aikin's Athenæum, the Monthly Repository, and the Christian Reformer, by the late Rev. Eliezer Cogan, 2 parts, I. Classical; II. Theological, Metaphysical, and Biblical. Extracted and compiled by his son, Richard Cogan, 1856.

He was the author of several sermons on the deaths of members of his congregation at Cheshunt and Walthamstow, and he read in manuscript and suggested some alterations in Alexander Crombie's Natural Theology (1829).

A long memoir of Cogan appeared in the Christian Reformer, xi. 237–59 (1855), and was printed at Hackney as a pamphlet the same year. His third daughter Eliza, wife of Thomas Field Gibson, printed for private circulation 25 copies of a short work entitled Recollections of my Youth, Written at the Request of my Daughter, giving details of school-life under Cogan.
