= Philip Holland (minister) =

English nonconformist minister

- Born: 1721; Wem, England, Great Britain
- Died: 2 January 1789 (aged 67–68); Bolton, England, Great Britain
- Spouse: Catherine Holland
- Children: 1 son and daughter
- Parent(s): Mary Holland nee Savage (mother); Thomas Holland (father)

Philip Holland (1721 – 2 January 1789) was an English nonconformist minister.

== Family and education ==
The eldest son of Thomas Holland, he was born at Wem, Shropshire. His father, Thomas Holland, a pupil of James Coningham, was ordained in August 1714 as presbyterian minister at Kingsley, Cheshire, and moved to Wem in 1717. His mother was Mary Savage, granddaughter of Philip Henry.

Philip Holland entered Philip Doddridge's dissenting academy at Northampton in 1739. He was followed in 1744 by his brother John, who conformed; and in 1751 by his brother Henry, who was transferred to Caleb Ashworth's Daventry Academy, and became minister at Prescot and (1765) at Ormskirk, where he died on 10 December 1781.

== Minister ==
Philip first preached at Wolverhampton, Staffordshire; he then became his father's successor at Wem. In the autumn of 1755 he became minister of Bank Street Unitarian Chapel, Bolton, Lancashire, in succession to Thomas Dixon. On account of the popularity of his ministry, the chapel was enlarged in 1760. He kept a boarding-school also. From 1785 William Hawkes (1759–1820) was his colleague.

In theology, Holland was of the Arian school, influenced by John Seddon of Warrington, who introduced him to the philosophy of Francis Hutcheson. He assisted Seddon in setting up (1757) Warrington Academy, and wrote the third service in a collection of forms of prayer (1763) edited by Seddon, and generally known as the Liverpool Liturgy. He took an active part in the movement for the repeal (1779) of the doctrinal subscription required by the Toleration Act; after this date his views became somewhat more heterodox. In politics he was an advocate of the independence of the American colonies.

He died at Bolton on 2 January 1789, aged 67. There was a mural monument to his memory in Bank Street Chapel. He married Catharine Holland of Mobberley, Cheshire, and had a son and daughter.

== Works ==
He published sermons, including: ‘The Importance of Learning,’ &c., Warrington, 1760, (reprinted in English Preacher, 1773, vol. ix.) Posthumous was: ‘Sermons on Practical Subjects,’ &c., Warrington, 1792, 2 vols. (this collection, to which a silhouette likeness is prefixed, includes his separate publications, and was edited by John Holland and William Turner). Some of his letters to Seddon are printed in the ‘Seddon Papers’ in the Christian Reformer, 1854 and 1855.
