= David Jennings (tutor) =

English Dissenting minister and tutor

David Jennings (1691–1762) was an English Dissenting minister and tutor, known also as the author of Jewish Antiquities.

== Life ==
He was the younger son of the ejected minister John Jennings (1634–1701), whose ministry to the independent congregation at Kibworth was continued by his elder brother John. David passed through the Kibworth grammar school, and studied for the ministry (1709–14) at the Fund Academy in Moorfields, under Isaac Chauncy and his successors, Thomas Ridgley, D.D., and John Eames. His first sermon was at Battersea, 23 May 1714. In March 1715 he was chosen evening lecturer at Rotherhithe; in June 1716 he became assistant to John Foxon at Girdlers' Hall, Basinghall Street; on 19 May 1718 he was called to succeed Thomas Simmons as pastor of the independent congregation, Old Gravel Lane at Wapping New Stairs. Here he was ordained on 25 July 1718, and in this charge he remained till his death.

At the Salters' Hall debates of 1719 he sided with the non-subscribers, though a Calvinist. In 1733 he was selected by William Coward as one of the lecturers in Bury Street, St. Mary Axe; he became one of the Coward trustees in May 1743, and in August 1743 one of the Coward lecturers at Little St. Helen's.

Jennings's career as a divinity tutor began in 1744, on the death of Eames, whose successor he became under the Coward trust. At this point the "congregational" fund transferred its support to another academy. The Presbyterian board sent him no students till 1758. Jennings extended the course of study from four years to five, and abandoned the boarding school model. The lectures were given in Wellclose Square, at the residence of Samuel Morton Savage, the tutor in classics and philosophy. Unlike his brother John, Jennings did not attempt lectures on an independent plan. The divinity textbook on which he lectured was the ‘Medulla Theologiæ’ of the Dutch divine, Van Marck. His lecture notes on the Moses and Aaron of Thomas Godwyn became the posthumous work on Jewish Antiquities, by which Jennings is best known.

A strict disciplinarian, he was suspicious of any heterodoxy. Two of his students, Thomas and John Wright, afterwards Presbyterian ministers in Bristol, were expelled on grounds of doctrine; in fact the majority of his pupils became Arians, according to Alexander Gordon writing in the Dictionary of National Biography. Philip Furneaux, his editor, Joshua Toulmin, his biographer, and Abraham Rees, the encyclopedist, were among his students; Thomas Cogan and Thomas Jervis were under him for short periods. He encouraged the study of physical science, enjoyed astronomy, and had in practical mechanics as a hobby; he was also musical.

In May 1749 the university of St. Andrews, at Philip Doddridge's suggestion, sent him its diploma of D.D. He enjoyed good health till the last two years of his life, and died on Thursday, 16 September 1762.

== Family ==
His eldest son, Joseph, married a daughter of Daniel Neal, by Elizabeth, sister of Nathaniel Lardner. Joseph Jennings's son David (died 6 December 1819) was the author of Hawkhurst, a Sketch of its History, &c., 1792; he had erected in 1789 a monument to Lardner, his great-uncle, in Hawkhurst Church, Kent.

== Works ==
Jennings published several sermons, including an ordination sermon for John Jennings (1742) and funeral sermons for Daniel Neal (1743), Isaac Watts (1749), and Timothy Jollie (1757); also;

- ‘The Beauty and Benefit of Early Piety,’ &c., 1730.
- ‘A Vindication of the Scripture Doctrine of Original Sin,’ &c., 1740, anonymous. This work was against John Taylor of Norwich.
- ‘An Introduction to the Use of the Globes,’ &c., 1747; an appendix deals with some astronomical difficulties in the Book of Genesis.
- ‘The Scripture Testimony … an Appeal to Reason … for the Truth of the Holy Scriptures,’ &c., 1755; several times reprinted; 1815, 12mo, with preface by B. Cracknell, D.D.

Posthumous were;

- ‘An Introduction to the Knowledge of Medals,’ &c., 1763; reprinted, Birmingham, 1775.
- ‘Jewish Antiquities,’ &c., 1766, 2 vols.; reprinted in 1 vol., 1808, 1823, 1837, &c. Edited by Philip Furneaux.

His Bury Street lectures were published in 1735; he translated a tract of A. H. Francke on preaching, 1736, and issued an abridgment of Cotton Mather's life, 1744.
