= Octagon Chapel, Liverpool =

Former chapel in England

Coordinates: 53°24′24.44″N 2°59′9.56″W

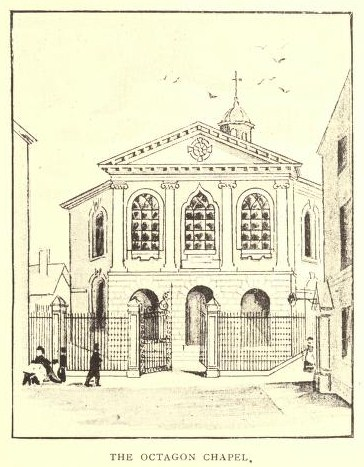
Octagon Chapel, pen-and-ink sketch (artist unknown).

The Octagon Chapel, Liverpool, was a nonconformist church in Liverpool, England, opened in 1763. It was founded by local congregations, those of Benn's Garden and Kaye Street chapels. The aim was to use a non-sectarian liturgy; Thomas Bentley was a major figure in founding the chapel, and had a hand in the liturgy.

== Background ==
The dissenting group in Liverpool in the middle of the eighteenth century was in numerical terms shrinking. Many from congregations had conformed to the Church of England. A plan for a set liturgy, as a method of reform of dissenting services, was proposed by some Lancashire ministers in 1750. Despite open opposition by John Brekell from 1758, who by then had been ministering at the Kaye Street Chapel for nearly 30 years, the compilation of a new liturgy went ahead. The Kaye Street Chapel (also Key Street) dated from 1707, and belonged to the Warrington presbyterian classis.

The Benn's Garden Chapel in Red Cross Street, Liverpool, dated from 1727 and had been built for the Presbyterian minister Henry Winder. In 1763 its minister John Henderson became a conforming Anglican; at that point William Enfield became sole minister there to a congregation with many local merchants. While Brekell was a conservative Presbyterian, and Enfield's theology was Unitarian, the ministers of the two chapels from which the Octagon congregation had broken away then worked together on an alternative work, A New Collection of Psalms Proper for Christian Worship (1764).

A listing of the non-Anglican places of worship in Liverpool in 1775 mentions, besides the two Presbyterian chapels and the Octagon: a Methodist chapel; two Baptist meeting-places; a Quaker meeting-house; a Catholic chapel and a synagogue, both small. The population was around 35,000.

== Design and history of the chapel ==
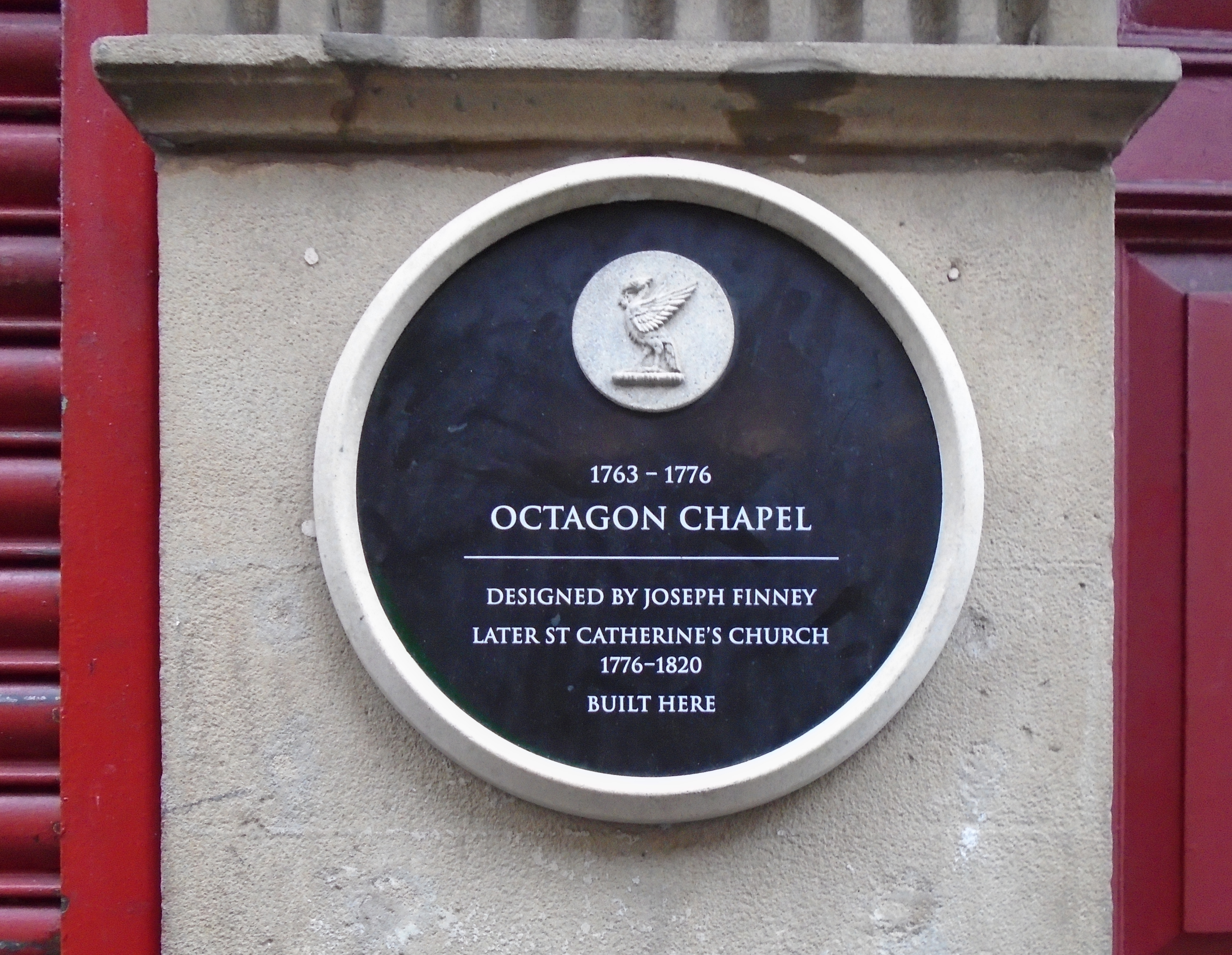
Commemorative plaque at the site of the former Chapel.

As the name suggests, the building had eight sides, like the Octagon Chapel, Norwich (1756, Thomas Ivory). The chapel was to a design by Joseph Finney, and was built in Temple Court. Nicholas Clayton, of Unitarian views, accepted an invitation to become the first minister there; the appointment was joint with Hezekiah Kirkpatrick. The congregation were nicknamed the Octagonians. but the chapel's existence depended very much on Bentley, who eventually moved to London. The experimental liturgy did not gain the anticipated support, from those in the founding congregations who did not want to use the Book of Common Prayer.

The chapel was sold in 1776, to a clergyman, Rev. Plumbe, Rector of Aughton; and became an Anglican church, St Catherine's. The Anglican incumbents were: Rev. John Plumbe; Rev. Wilmot; Rev. Brownlow Forde; and jointly RK Milner and Thomas Bold. The building was demolished in 1820, the Corporation of Liverpool having bought it; and a Fire Police Station was built on the site.

Clayton moved from 1776 to share the ministry at Benn's Garden Chapel with Robert Lewin (1739–1825), of Arian views, until 1781. In later years Lewin's congregation there was considered Unitarian, and included William Rathbone and William Roscoe. This congregation moved in time to Renshaw Street Unitarian Chapel, the Benn's Garden chapel being sold to Wesleyan Methodists. The contemporary Ullet Road Unitarian Church identifies its history as going back to Winder's congregation. In 1786 Kirkpatrick became the minister of Park Lane Chapel, Bryn, near Wigan.

== The Liverpool Liturgy ==
The liturgy of the Octagon Chapel became known as the Liverpool Liturgy. It was written by Philip Holland and Richard Godwin, and was published in 1763, as edited by John Seddon. Among the hymns chosen was one by Elizabeth Scott, later arranged by John Broderip. The Octagonian psalms, at least, became known to Thomas Jefferson.

Although it was adopted by a prominent minister, David Williams, for his congregation at Exeter, the liturgy proved controversial and even divisive. Seddon and Holland were founders of the nearby Warrington Academy: John Taylor, who was a tutor there, opposed the liturgy from before the time of its publication. Seddon and Taylor had in fact a profound disagreement on the suitability of the philosophy of Francis Hutcheson for the teaching at the academy; while the liturgy was Hutchesonian in intent.

While Bentley in 1762 had found the proposed liturgy "very chaste and yet animated", the basic idea, as well as that of the chapel, was contentious. Seddon himself backed away from becoming the chapel's minister, preferring extemporary prayer to a formal service. The arguments that Anglicans of broad views would prefer a liturgy, and that it would curb the tendency to free-thinking in nonconformists, remained on a theoretical level, and were apparently contradicted by Methodist success at the time. Job Orton, who supported Taylor's position, went as far as to say that the liturgy had damaged the reputation of Warrington Academy.

In the longer term, the creedless and liberal liturgy of the Octagon Chapel formed a starting point for the beliefs and writings of Anna Aikin (later Anna Barbauld) who was brought up at Warrington Academy, her father John Aikin being a tutor there and on Seddon's side of the debate. The liturgy was however condemned by others, following Orton's verdict: "It is scarcely a Christian Liturgy; in the Collects the name of Christ is hardly mentioned, and the Spirit is quite banished from it"; and elsewhere "Grieved I am, and very much so, to see such an almost deistical composition", an opinion followed in Charles Buck's Theological Dictionary (c.1820).

== See also ==
Other Unitarian churches in Liverpool include:

- Hope Street Unitarian Chapel
- Renshaw Street Unitarian Chapel
- Toxteth Unitarian Chapel
- Ullet Road Unitarian Church

Other eight-sided Unitarian churches include:

- First Unitarian Church of Philadelphia

== Bibliography ==
- Nightingale, B (1890), "The Octagon Chapel", Lancashire Nonconformity: or, Sketches, historical & descriptive, of the Congregational and old Presbyterian churches in the county.
- McCarthy, William (2009), Anna Letitia Barbauld: Voice of the Enlightenment, Baltimore, Maryland: Johns Hopkins University Press.
