= Ukawsaw Gronniosaw =

African-born author and soldier (1705–1775)

- Born: c. 1705; Kanem–Bornu Empire
- Died: 28 September 1775 (aged 70) (Note: Gronniosaw's death was reported on Monday 2 October 1775 in the Chester Chronicle. It stated he died the Thursday before.); Chester, Cheshire
- Burial place: St Oswald's, Chester
- Other name: James Albert
- Occupations: Writer, soldier
- Spouse: Betty Albert
- Children: 5
- Military career
- Allegiance: Great Britain
- Branch: British Army
- Service years: 1761–1763
- Rank: Private
- Unit: 28th Regiment of Foot
- Conflicts: Seven Years' War; Invasion of Martinique (1762); Siege of Havana

Ukawsaw Gronniosaw (c. 1705 – 28 September 1775), also known as James Albert, was an African-born author and soldier. Born in the Kanem–Bornu Empire, he was forced into slavery by a local ruler while visiting the Gold Coast region. Gronniosaw persuaded a Dutch sea captain to purchase him, and the captain took him to Barbados and sold him to an American colonist. His new enslaver took Gronniosaw to New York and sold him to Theodorus Jacobus Frelinghuysen, a Dutch Reformed Church minister who lived in New Jersey.

Frelinghuysen taught Gronniosaw to read and write and converted him to Christianity, and when the former died in 1747 he freed the latter in his will. Gronniosaw worked for Frelinghuysen's immediate family though they all died by 1751, leaving him free of any obligations. Making plans to travel to England, Gronniosaw went to the West Indies in the interim, where he served as a cook onboard a British privateer during the Seven Years' War.

Gronniosaw enlisted in the British Army in 1761 to pay for his passage to England, serving in the invasion of Martinique and siege of Havana in 1762 before being discharged in 1763. Upon his arrival in England he initially stayed in Portsmouth before moving to London and marrying an English weaver named Betty. Gronniosaw moved with his family to Colchester and then Norwich before settling down in Kidderminster. A slave narrative he authored was published in Bath in 1772, and Gronniosaw died in 1775.

== Early life ==
Ukawsaw Gronniosaw was born in the Kanem–Bornu Empire in c. 1705. In his autobiography Gronniosaw claimed he was the grandson of a king who lived in Zaara. As an adolescent Gronniosaw was taken to the Gold Coast region by an African merchant after the latter invited Gronniosaw to visit his home. Following Gronniosaw's arrival to the Gold Coast, a local ruler ordered him to be executed on suspicion on espionage but eventually reversed the decision and sentenced him to be enslaved. Persuading a Dutch sea caption to purchase him, in 1730 Gronniosaw travelled with the captain to the British colony of Barbados, where he was sold to a resident of the Thirteen Colonies of British America. His new enslaver took Gronniosaw to the Province of New York and resold him for £50 to "Mr. Freelandhouse, a very gracious, good Minister." Freelandhouse was Theodorus Jacobus Frelinghuysen, a Dutch Reformed Church minister who lived in the Province of New Jersey and served as a church pastor in Middlesex and Somerset counties.

== Life in the Americas ==
c. 1742 engraving of a private of the 28th Foot, which Gronniosaw joined in 1761

In New Jersey Gronniosaw was taught to read and write by Frelinghuysen, who converted him to Christianity. Though Gronniosaw told Frelinghuysen he wished to return to his family in Africa, Frelinghuysen denied his request and told him to focus on the Christian faith. During his time with Frelinghuysen Gronniosaw attempted suicide, distressed by his perceived failings as a Christian. When Frelinghuysen died in 1747 he freed Gronniosaw in his will. Gronniosaw began working for Frelinghuysen widow and subsequently their orphans, but the entire family died within four years. Now free of any obligations Gronniosaw planned to travel to England where he expected to meet similarly pious people like the Frelinghuysens. In the interim he went to the West Indies, and after the Seven Years' War broke out in 1756 Gronniosaw joined the crew of a British privateer as a cook.

In 1761 Gronniosaw enlisted in the British Army in New York in order to acquire enough money to travel to England. He joined the 28th Regiment of Foot at the rank of private and boarded a troopship which sailed out of New York Harbor in the final weeks of 1761 as part of a 6,000-strong expeditionary force intended to attack the French West Indies. Escorted by a British fleet under Admiral of the Blue George Pocock, the force arrived at Barbados in January 1762. In the same month the 28th Foot participated in the invasion of the French colony of Martinique, landing on 5 January. The colony capitulated on 12 February, and in the next month the regiment was part of a new force which was ordered to capture Havana, the capital of Spanish Cuba. Arriving in Cuba in June, the regiment participated in the siege of Havana, which fell on 14 August. Gronniosaw was discharged in 1763 and sailed to England.

== Life in England ==
Gronniosaw initially settled in Portsmouth, but when his landlady swindled him out of most of his savings he travelled to London out of neccessity. There he married a young English widow, a weaver named Betty. She already had a child and bore him at least two more. However, Betty soon lost her job because due to a financial depression and industrial unrest and the whole family moved to Colchester. There they were saved from starvation by the Quaker lawyer Osgood Hanbury, who employed Gronniosaw as a construction worker. Moving to Norwich, Gronniosaw and his family again fell on hard times, as the building trades were largely seasonal. Once again, they were saved by the kindness of a Quaker, Henry Gurney (coincidentally, the grandfather of Fowell Buxton's wife, Hannah Gurney), who paid their rent arrears. A daughter died and was refused burial by the local clergy because she was not baptised. One minister at last offered to allow her to be buried in the churchyard, but he would not read the burial service.

After pawning all their possessions, the family moved to Kidderminster, where Betty supported them by working again as a weaver. On Christmas Day 1771, Gronniosaw had their remaining children, Mary Albert (aged six), Edward Albert (aged four), and newborn Samuel Albert, baptised in the Old Independent Meeting House in Kidderminster by Benjamin Fawcett, a Dissenting minister and associate of Selina Hastings, Countess of Huntingdon and a significant figure in Calvinistic Methodism. At around the same time, Gronniosaw received a letter and a charitable donation from Hastings herself. On 3 January 1772, he responded by thanking her for her "favour", which arrived "at a time of great necessity", and explained that he had just returned from "Mrs Marlowe's" in nearby Leominster "were I was shewed kindness to from my Christian friends." On 25 June 1774, Gronniosaw's fifth child, James Albert junior, was baptised again by Fawcett.

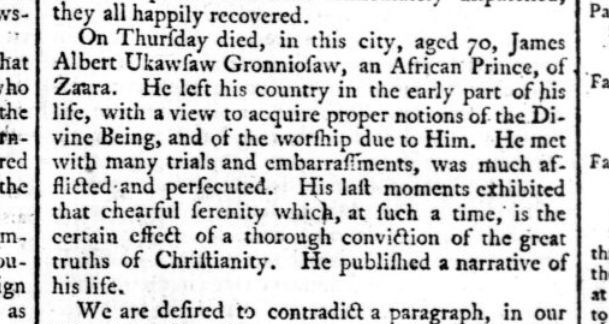
Gronniosaw's death notice published in the Chester Chronicle on 2 October 1775

Shortly after he arrived in Kidderminster, Gronniosaw began work on his autobiography with the help of an amanuensis from Leominster, possibly the "Mrs Marlowe" he had mentioned in his letter to Hastings. Gronniosaw's Narrative has been studied by scholars as a groundbreaking work by an African in English. It is the first known slave narrative published in England and received wide attention, with multiple printings and editions. Gronniosaw's Narrative concludes with its author still living in Kidderminster, having "appear[ed] to be turn'd sixty"; for a long time, nothing was known of his later life. However, at some point during the late twentieth century, an obituary for Gronniosaw was discovered in the Chester Chronicle. The article, from 2 October 1775, reads:

On Thursday died, in this city, aged 70, James Albert Ukawsaw Gronniosaw, an African Prince, of Zaara. He left his country in the early part of his life, with a view to acquire proper notions of the Divine Being, and of the worship due to Him. He met with many trials and embarrassments, was much afflicted and persecuted. His last moments exhibited that chearful serenity which, at such a time, is the certain effect of a thorough conviction of the great truths of Christianity. He published a narrative of his life.

The burial register for the Church of England parish church of St Oswald, Chester – a church that occupied the south transept of Chester Cathedral from 1448 to 1881 – includes an entry from 28 September 1775 for "James Albert (a Blackm[an])", giving his age as 70. Gronniosaw's grave has not been identified.

== Autobiography ==
Gronniosaw's autobiography, titled A Narrative of the Most remarkable Particulars in the Life of James Albert Ukawsaw Gronniosaw, an African Prince, As related by himself, was published in Bath, Somerset in December 1772. The title page explains that it was "committed to paper by the elegant pen of a young LADY of the town of LEOMINSTER." It is one of the first English-language narratives by an African and was a prominent example of slave narratives by Black authors. The work gives a vivid account of Gronniosaw's life. He was attracted to this last town because it was at one time the home of Richard Baxter, a 17th-century Nonconformist minister whom Gronniosaw had grown to admire. The preface was written by the Reverend Walter Shirley, cousin to Selina Hastings, Countess of Huntingdon, who was a patron of the Calvinist wing of Methodism. He interprets Gronniosaw's experience of enslavement and his being transported from Bornu to New York as an example of Calvinist predestination and election.

Scholar Henry Louis Gates Jr. noted that Gronniosaw's narrative differed from later slave narratives, which generally criticised slavery as an institution. In his account, Gronniosaw referred to his "white-skinned sister," said that he had been willing to leave Africa because his family believed in many deities instead of one almighty God (which he learned more about under Christianity), and suggested that he became happier as he assimilated to white society, through clothing but mostly via language. In addition, he stated a black servant at Frelinghuysen's house named Old Ned was the first person to inform him of the Devil, who lives in Hell and punishes the wicked. This was done to discourage the teenage Gronniosaw from using profanity. Gates has concluded that the narrative does not have an anti-slavery view, as was ubiquitous in subsequent slave narratives. Until the discovery of the 1775 obituary and a manuscript letter written by Gronniosaw to Hastings, the Narrative was the only significant source of information for his life.

== Additional sources ==
- Echero, Michael. "Theologizing 'Underneath the Tree': an African topos in Ukawsaw Gronniosaw, William Blake, and William Cole". Research in African Literatures. 23.4 (Winter 1992). 51–58.
- Harris, Jennifer. "Seeing the Light: Re-Reading James Albert Ukawsaw Gronniosaw". English Language Notes 42.4, 2005: 43–57.
