= Nicholas Clayton (divine) =

English presbyterian minister

Nicholas Clayton, D.D. (1733?–1797) was an English presbyterian minister.

== Life ==
Clayton was the son of Samuel Clayton of Old Park, Enfield, Middlesex, and was born about 1733. He was educated by private teachers at St Albans and Chelmsford, at a dissenting academy in Northampton, and at the University of Glasgow.

He was minister from 1759 to 1763 of the Presbyterian chapel at Boston, Lincolnshire From there he was invited in 1763 to the newly built Octagon Chapel, Liverpool; the promoters of this chapel had the plan of introducing a liturgy which dissenters and members of the established church might join in using. The scheme was carried on for thirteen years, but it was not supported by the members of the church who had professed to be dissatisfied with the Book of Common Prayer. The chapel was then sold to a clergyman of the church of England, and Clayton went to the chapel in Benn's Garden, Liverpool, as the colleague of the Rev. Robert Lewin.

In the spring of 1781 he was appointed divinity tutor at Warrington Academy, in succession to John Aikin; but it was then in its final years. In 1783 he returned to Liverpool broken in health. While at Warrington, in 1782 he received the degree of D.D. from the University of Edinburgh.

From 1785 to 1795 he ministered at the High Pavement Chapel, Nottingham as the colleague of George Walker. He then returned once more to Liverpool, and died there on 20 May 1797, aged 66. He married in 1765 Dorothy, daughter of James Nicholson of Liverpool.

== Works ==
The sermon with which he concluded the services at the Octagon on 25 February 1776 was published under the title of ‘The Importance of Sincerity in Public Worship to Truth, Morals, and Christianity.’ Besides this sermon, he printed one in the same year entitled ‘The Minister of the Gospel represented in a sermon on 1 Cor. x. 33’ and another in 1776, on prayer.
