= Walter Jenkin Evans =

British historian (1856–1927)

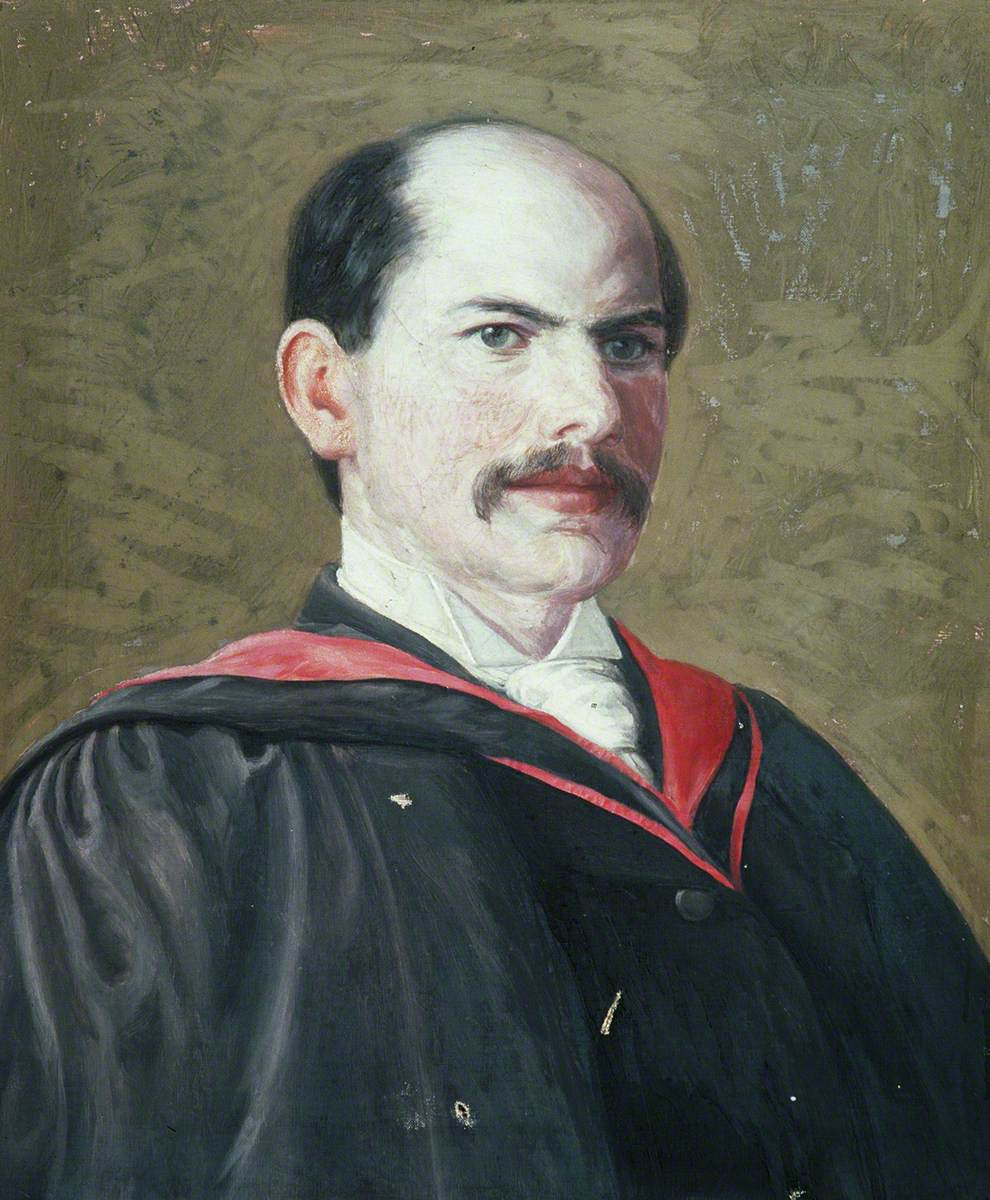
Professor Walter Jenkin Evans, Carmarthen Presbyterian College

Walter Jenkin Evans (1 April 1856 – 10 February 1927) was a Welsh academic who served as Principal of Carmarthen Presbyterian College and who wrote about the history and people of Unitarianism in Carmarthen.

== Early life and education ==
Evans was born on 1 April 1856 at Carmarthen, South Wales, the son of Rev Titus Evans. After schooling at Parc-y-felfed Preparatory School (also known as Parkyvelvet Academy) and at Queen Elizabeth's Grammar School in Carmarthen.

Evans went to Carmarthen Presbyterian College from 1870 to 1873, then to Jesus College, Oxford, and Manchester College, Oxford, obtaining his BA in 1878 and his MA in 1880.

== Teaching career ==
After teaching in London and in Brighton from 1879 to 1884, he returned to Carmarthen Presbyterian College in 1884 as tutor in Latin and Greek. In 1888, he became Principal (the appointment attracting some controversy at the time on theological grounds). He helped to establish good links between the college and the University of Wales during his time in office, and served as Dean of Divinity for the university from 1910 to 1913.

== Academic Works ==
Whilst Evans published some research on Latin poetry (Alliteratio Latina, or Alliteration in Latin Verse, 1921), his main work was on the history of Unitarianism. He wrote on the history of Carmarthen Academy and on the history of Unitarianism in Carmarthen, and also penned biographies of Unitarian students from Carmarthen. The National Library of Wales holds six manuscript volumes of his biographies and notes on the history of his denomination.

== Personal life ==
He married Annie Curtis in 1888, and they had two sons and one daughter. He was also the first cousin to the jurist, Daniel Thomas Tudor.

== Death ==
Evans died at home in Carmarthen on 10 February 1927. He was survived by his wife and their 3 children, Major Stuart Evans, Alice Mellor, and Grace Evans.
