= Benjamin Boothroyd =

English Independent minister and Hebrew scholar

Benjamin Boothroyd (10 October 1768 – 8 September 1836) was an English Independent minister and Hebrew scholar. He had the degrees of D.D. and L.L.D. (Doctor of Divinity & Doctor of Laws)

== Life ==
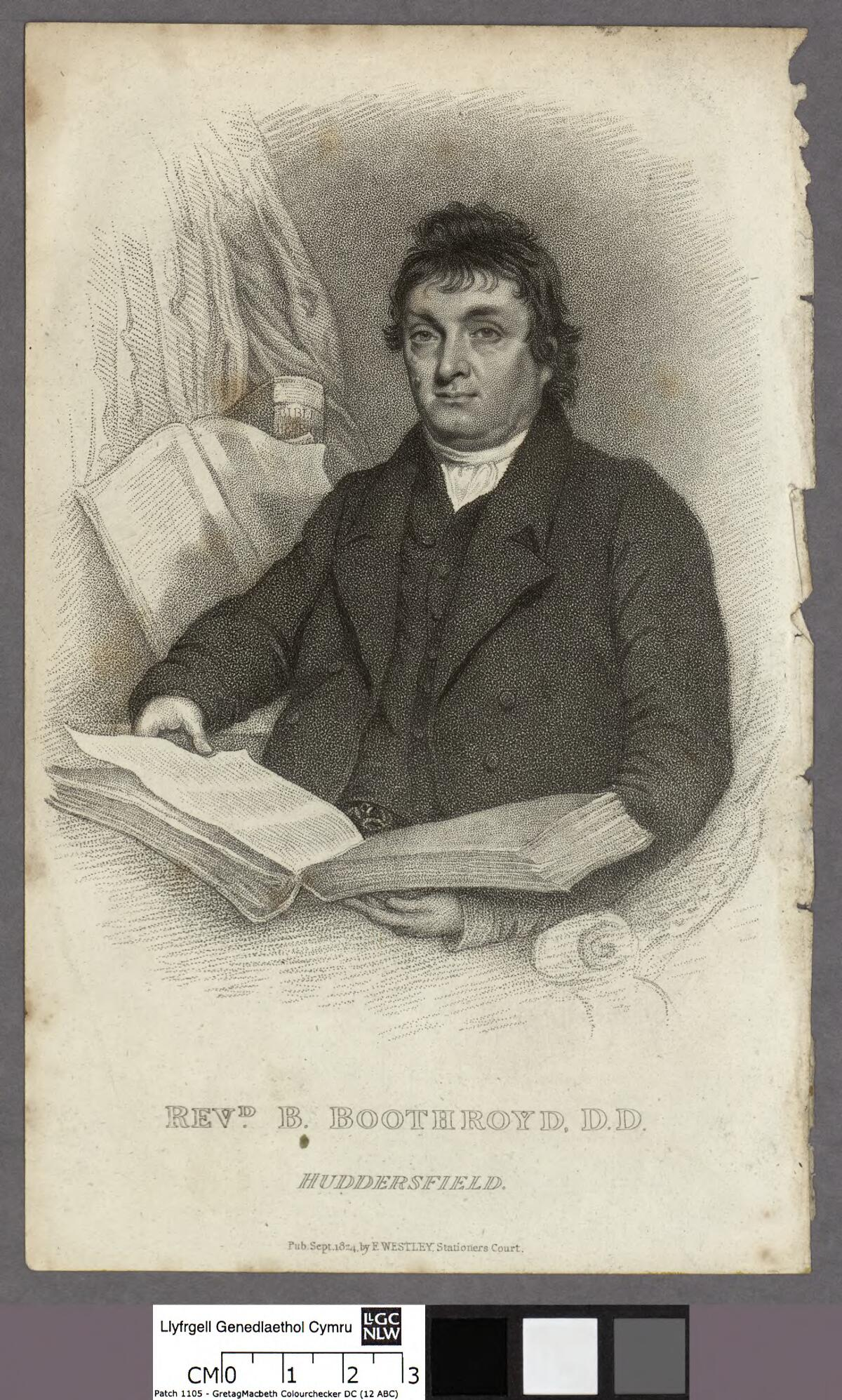
A portrait from the Welsh Portrait Collection at the National Library of Wales. Depicted person: Benjamin Boothroyd – English Independent minister and Hebrew scholar.

Born at Warley Town, in the parish of Halifax, Yorkshire, on 10 October 1768, Booth was the son of a shoemaker there. He was sent to the village school, leaving it when six years old. He helped his father to make shoes for a time, but when about 14 years old he ran away. In Lancashire he found work with a Methodist; and later returned to Warley to superintend his father's trade.

About 1785 Boothroyd devoted himself to religion, attended prayer meetings and spoke at them; he read Philip Doddridge's works and was admitted a student of the North Howram dissenting academy. In 1790 he was chosen minister at Pontefract. Ordained there, he succeeded in filling his chapel and a new one was built. He also opened a shop as a bookseller and printer.

In 1818 Boothroyd (who had accepted the degree of LL.D.) became co-pastor at Highfield Chapel, Huddersfield, with the Rev. William Moorhouse. On 10 January 1836 he went down with a violent illness; he died on 8 September and was buried at Huddersfield.

== Works ==
In 1807, having had materials for a history of the town given to him by a Richard Hepworth, Booth added to them, and brought out, at his own press, History of the Ancient Borough of Pontefract. He then studied Hebrew, to produce a new Hebrew bible. He printed the work himself, and his wife helped him in correcting the proofs. It was brought out in quarterly parts, beginning in 1810, and finishing in 1813, under the title of Biblia Hebraica : or the Hebrew scriptures of the Old Testament, without points, after the text of Kennicott, with the chief various readings...accompanied with English notes, critical, philological, and explanatory, selected from the...Biblical critics, and formed finally two volumes, as a project taking seven years.

Boothroyd published standard works, and sermons of his own. His Sermon occasioned by the Death of Miss B. Shilito (1813) included Miss Shilito's conversion narrative.

In 1824 Booth completed his New Family Bible and Improved Version in three volumes to which had been suggested to him on a visit to York by Henry Tuke, a Quaker. The specialty of this translation is that he ensured to have God's name as "Jehovah" as it is called out on the original Hebrew scriptures. He printed many copies of it at his own press. It contained notes, and in recognition of his achievement the University of Glasgow conferred on Boothroyd the degree of D.D. in 1824. In 1835 he completed an octavo edition of the Family Bible.

== Family ==
In 1801 Boothroyd married a Miss Hurst of Pontefract; she died in 1832. They had four daughters and four sons.

== Notes ==
Attribution

- This article incorporates text from a publication now in the public domain: Stephen, Leslie, ed. (1886). "Boothroyd, Benjamin". Dictionary of National Biography. Vol. 5. London: Smith, Elder & Co.
