= Stephen Addington =

English dissenting clergyman and teacher (1729–1796)

Stephen Addington D.D. (9 June 1729, in Northampton, England – 6 February 1796, in Minories) was a scholarly English dissenting clergyman and teacher.

== Life ==
He was born at Northampton, June 9, 1729, and was educated under Dr. Philip Doddridge, whose manner in the pulpit he closely followed for many years. After being admitted to preach, he removed in 1750, to Spaldwick in Huntingdonshire; where, in 1752, he married Miss Reymes of Norwich, a lady who died in 1811, at an advanced age. A few weeks after his marriage, he was called to be minister of a congregation of dissenters at Market Harborough, Leicestershire. His receiving this appointment was owing to a singular occurrence in the history of popular elections. Two candidates had appeared who divided the congregation so equally that a compromise was impossible, unless by each party giving up their favourite, and electing a third candidate, if one could be found agreeable to all. At this crisis Mr. Addington was recommended, and unanimously chosen. In this place he remained about thirty years, and became highly popular to his increasing congregation by the pious discharge of his pastoral duties, and by his conciliatory manners.

In 1758 he opened his house for the reception of pupils to fill up a vacancy in the neighbourhood of Harborough, occasioned by John Aikin's move to Warrington Academy. This scheme succeeded; and for many years he devoted nine hours each day to the instruction of his pupils, and compiled books for their improvement.

At length, in 1781 he received an invitation to become pastor of the congregation in Miles's-lane, Cannon Street; and soon after his removal there was chosen tutor of a new dissenting academy at Mile End, where he resided until his growing infirmities, occasioned by several paralytic strokes, obliged him to relinquish the charge. He continued, however, in the care of his congregation till within a few months of his decease, when, from the same cause, he was compelled to discontinue his public services. He died Feb. 6, 1796, at his house in the Minories. In London he was neither so successful or popular as in the country; and his quitting Harborough after so long a residence appears to have displeased his friends, without adding to his usefulness among his new connections.

== Works ==
His textbooks and other writings include the following.

- A system of Arithmetic, 2 vols. 8vo.
- The Rudiments of the Greek tongue, 1761, 12mo.
- Eusebes to Philetus; or Letters from a Father to his Son, on a devout temper and life, 1761, 12mo.
- Maxims religious and prudential, with a Sermon to young People, 12mo.
- The Youth's Geographical Grammar, 1770, 8vo.
- Dissertation on the religious knowledge of the ancient Jews and Patriarchs; to which is annexed a specimen of a Greek and English Concordance, 1757, 4to; which he had a design of completing, if his health and time had permitted.

He published also, partly in the country, and partly in London, some occasional funeral and other sermons; two tracts on infant baptism; a collection of psalm tunes, and another of anthems; and his most popular work, The Life of St. Paul the Apostle, 1784, 8vo.

== Sources ==
1. Chalmers, Alexander. The General Biographical Dictionary: Containing an Historical and Critical Account of the Lives and Writings of the most Eminent Persons in Every Nation; Particularly the British and Irish; from the Earliest Accounts to the Present Time. new ed. rev. and enl. London: Nichols [et al.], 1812-1817. 32 vols.
