= George Walker (mathematician) =

English Dissenter, mathematician, theologian and activist

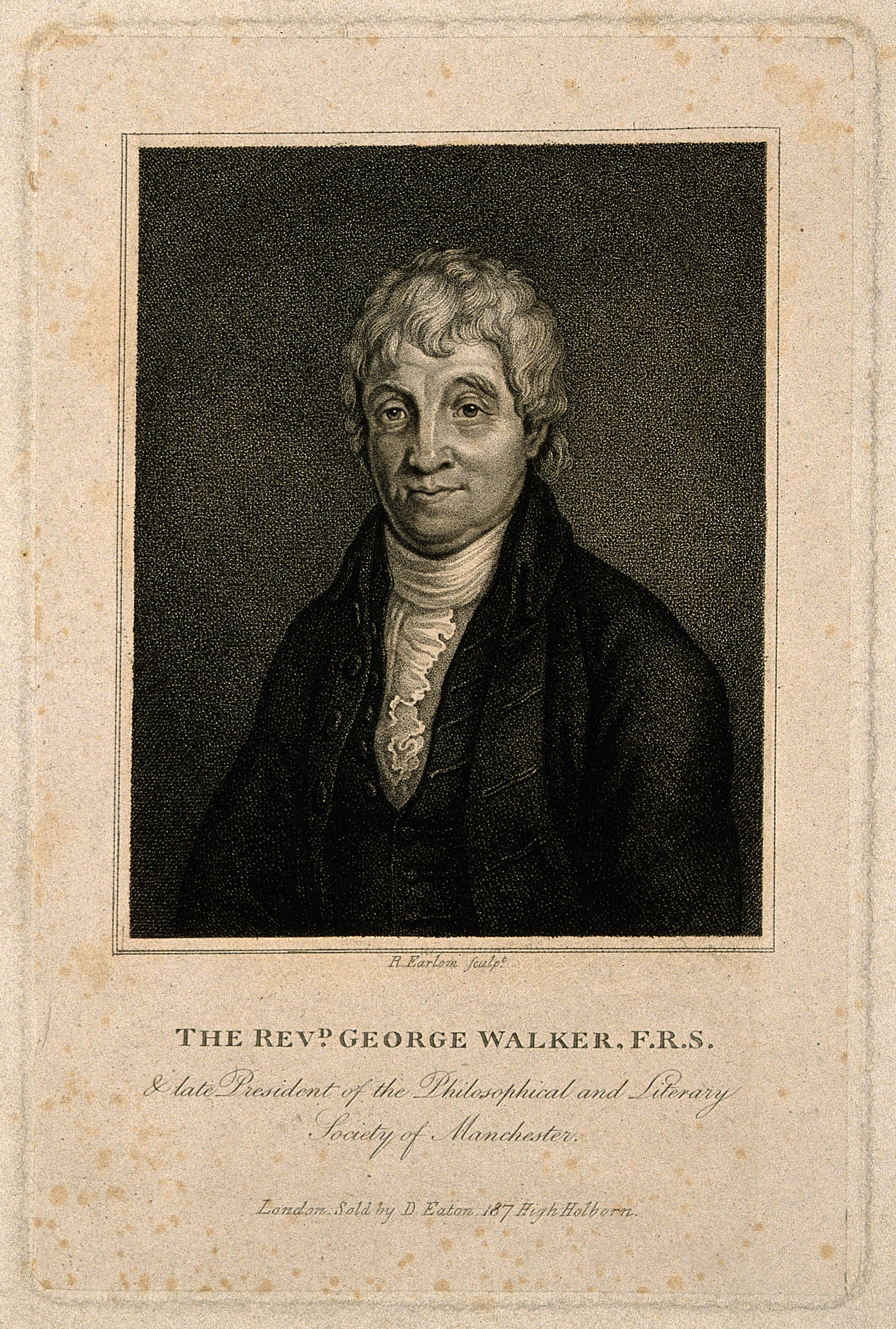

George Walker (c. 1734–1807) was a versatile English Dissenter, known as a mathematician, theologian, Fellow of the Royal Society, and activist.

== Life ==
He was born at Newcastle-on-Tyne in or around 1734. At ten years of age he was placed in the care of an uncle at Durham, Thomas Walker (died 10 November 1763), successively minister at Cockermouth, 1732, Durham, 1736, and Mill Hill Chapel at Leeds, 1748. He attended the Durham School, by then "a north-country public school of repute and wide influence", under Richard Dongworth. In the autumn of 1749, being then about fifteen, he was admitted to the dissenting academy at Kendal under Caleb Rotherham; here he met his lifelong friend, John Manning (1730–1806). On Rotherham's retirement (1751) he was for a short time under Hugh Moises at Newcastle-on-Tyne. In November 1751 he entered at Edinburgh University with Manning, where he studied mathematics under Matthew Stewart. He moved to Glasgow in 1752 for the sake of the divinity lectures of William Leechman, continued his mathematical studies under Robert Simson, and heard the lectures of Adam Smith, but found their private conversation more instructive. Among his classmates were Newcome Cappe, Nicholas Clayton, and John Millar, members with him of a college debating society.

Leaving Glasgow in 1754 without graduating, he did occasional preaching at Newcastle and Leeds, and injured his health by study; he recovered by a course of sea bathing. In 1766 he declined an invitation to succeed Robert Andrews as minister of Platt Chapel, Manchester, but later in the year accepted a call (in succession to Joseph Wilkinson) from his uncle's former Presbyterian flock at Durham, and was ordained there in 1757.

At Durham he finished, but did not yet publish, his ‘Doctrine of the Sphere,’ begun in Edinburgh. With the signature P.M.D. (presbyterian minister, Durham) he contributed to the Ladies' Diary, then edited by Thomas Simpson. He left Durham at the beginning of 1762 to become minister at Filby, Norfolk, and assistant to John Whiteside (died 1784) at Great Yarmouth. Here he resumed his intimacy with Manning, now practising as a physician at Norwich. He began his treatise on conic sections, suggested to him by Isaac Newton's Arithmetica Universalis, 1707. He took pupils in mathematics and navigation. Through Richard Price he was elected Fellow of the Royal Society, and recommended to William Petty, 2nd Earl of Shelburne for the post of his librarian, afterwards filled by Joseph Priestley, but declined it (1772) owing to his approaching marriage. He accepted in the same year the office of mathematical tutor at Warrington Academy, in succession to John Holt (died 1772). Here he prepared for the press his treatise on the sphere, himself cutting out all the illustrative figures (twenty thousand, for an edition of five hundred copies). It appeared in quarto in 1775, and was reissued in 1777. Joseph Johnson gave him £40 for the copyright, returned by Walker on finding Johnson had lost money. The pay at Warrington did not answer his expectation. He resigned in two years, and in the autumn of 1774 became colleague to John Simpson (1746–1812) at High Pavement Chapel, Nottingham.

Here he remained for twenty-four years, developing in public work and as a pulpit orator. He reconciled a division in his congregation, founded a charity school (1788), and published a hymn-book. His colleagues after Simpson's retirement were (1778) Nathaniel Philipps (died 20 October 1842), the last dissenting minister who preached in a clerical wig (1785), Nicholas Clayton (1794), William Walters (died 11 April 1806). In conjunction with Gilbert Wakefield, who was in Nottingham from 1784 to 1790, he formed a literary club, meeting weekly at the members' houses. Nottingham was a focus of political opinion, which Walker led both by special sermons and by drafting petitions and addresses sent forward by the town in favour of the independence of the United States and the advocacy of parliamentary and other reforms. He won the commendation of Edmund Burke. His reform speech at the county meeting at Mansfield, 28 October 1782, was his greatest effort. William Henry Cavendish Bentinck, 3rd Duke of Portland compared him with Cicero. From 1787 he was chairman of the associated dissenters of Nottinghamshire, Derbyshire, and part of Yorkshire, whose object was to achieve the repeal of the Test Acts. His Dissenters' Plea, Birmingham (1790), was reckoned by Charles James Fox the best publication on the subject. He was an early advocate of the abolition of the slave trade. In 1794 he published his treatise on conic sections, while he was agitating against measures for the suppression of public opinion, which culminated in the Seditious Meetings Act 1795.

Towards the close of 1797, after a fruitless application to Thomas Belsham, Walker was invited to succeed Thomas Barnes as professor of theology in Manchester College. He resigned his Nottingham charge on 5 May 1798. There was one other tutor, but the funds were low, and Walker's appeal (19 April 1799) for increased subscriptions met with little response. From 1800 the entire burden of teaching, including classics and mathematics, fell on him. In addition he took charge (1801–3) of the congregation at Dob Lane Chapel, Failsworth. He resigned in 1803, and the college moved to York.

Walker remained for two years in the neighbourhood of Manchester, and continued to take an active part in its Literary and Philosophical Society, of which he was elected president on the death of Thomas Percival. In 1805 he removed to Wavertree, near Liverpool, still keeping up a connection with Manchester. In the spring of 1807 he went to London on a publishing errand; he died at Draper Hall, London, on 21 April 1807, and was buried in Bunhill Fields.

== Works ==
According to Alexander Gordon in the Dictionary of National Biography, Walker's theology, a ‘tempered Arianism,’ played no part in his own compositions, but shows itself in omissions and alterations in his Collection of Psalms and Hymns, Warrington, 1788. He wrote a few hymns. Many of his speeches and political addresses are found in his ‘Life’ and collected ‘Essays.’ Besides the mathematical works already mentioned, he published:

- ‘Sermons,’ 1790, 2 vols.

Posthumous were:

- ‘Sermons,’ 1808, 4 vols. (including reprint of the 1790 volume).
- ‘Essays ... prefixed ... Life of the Author,’ 1809, 2 vols.

== Family ==
He married in 1772 and was survived by his widow. They had two children: a son, George Walker, his father's biographer and author of Letters to a Friend (1843) on his reasons for nonconformity, became a resident in France, and a daughter, Sarah (died 8 December 1854), who married on 3 July 1795 to George Cayley of Brompton, near Scarborough. (J W Clay's expanded edition of Dugdale's Visitation of Yorkshire gives the date as 9 July 1795.)
