= Samuel Morton Savage =

English nonconformist minister and dissenting tutor

Samuel Morton Savage (1721–1791) was an English nonconformist minister and dissenting tutor.

== Life ==
He was born in London on 19 July 1721. His grandfather, John Savage, was pastor of the Seventh Day Baptist church, Mill Yard, Goodman's Fields. Savage was related to Hugh Boulter.

Savage first thought of medicine, and spent a year or two with his Uncle Toulmin, an apothecary, in Old Gravel Lane, Wapping. Through the influence of Isaac Watts he entered the Fund Academy, under John Eames. In 1744, while still a pupil, he was made assistant tutor in natural science and classics by the trustees of William Coward, a post he retained until the reconstruction of the academy in 1762; from the time of his marriage (1752) the lectures were delivered at his house in Wellclose Square.

Meanwhile, in December 1747, Savage became assistant minister at Duke's Place, Bury Street, St Mary Axe, to the independent congregation of which Watts had been pastor. He was ordained there as co-pastor to Samuel Price in 1753, and became sole pastor on 2 January 1757. In addition he held the office of afternoon preacher (1759–1766) and Thursday lecturer (1760–7) to the presbyterian congregation in Hanover Street under Jabez Earle. He was Friday lecturer (1761–90) at Little St. Helen's, and afternoon preacher (1769–75) at Clapham.

On the death of David Jennings, the Coward trustees moved the academy to a house in Hoxton Square, formerly the residence of Daniel Williams. Savage was placed in 1762 in the divinity chair, his colleagues in other branches being Andrew Kippis, and Abraham Rees (Savage was a Calvinist, Rees an Arian, Kippis a Socinian). Kippis resigned in 1784. Savage, who had been made B.D. by King's College, Aberdeen, on 28 April 1764, and D.D. by Marischal College, Aberdeen, in November 1767, held on until midsummer 1785, when the Hoxton academy was dissolved.

Like Jennings, Savage, though an orthodox Presbyterian, was a non-subscriber; he was one of the originators of the appeal to parliament in 1772 which resulted in the amendment (1779) of the Toleration Act, substituting a declaration of adhesion to the scriptures in place of a subscription to the doctrinal part of the Anglican articles. He resigned his congregation at Christmas 1787; his ministry, though prolonged, had not been popular. A bookish man, he avoided society, and buried himself in his ample library. He died on 21 February 1791 of a contraction of the œsophagus; unable to take food, he starved to a skeleton. He was buried in Bunhill Fields.

== Works ==
Savage published eight single sermons (1757–82), including ordination discourses for William Ford (1757) and Samuel Wilton (1766), and funeral discourses for David Jennings (1762) and Samuel Wilton (1778). A posthumous volume of Sermons (1796) was edited, with a life, by Joshua Toulmin.

== Family ==
Savage married first, in 1752, the only daughter (d. 1763) of George Houlme, stockbroker, of Hoxton Square; secondly, in 1770, Hannah Wilkin, who survived him. By his first marriage he left two daughters.
