= Hoxton Square =

Public garden square in the United Kingdom

Coordinates: 51.5277°N 0.08125°W

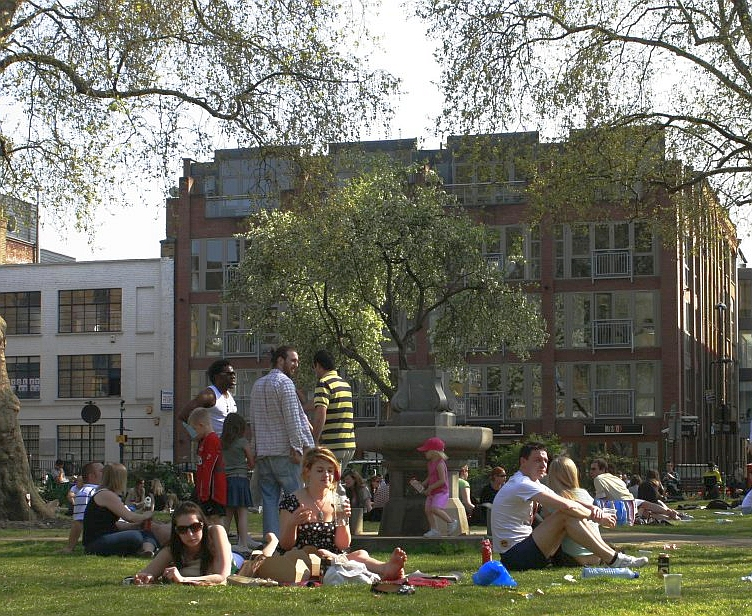
Hoxton Square garden in the summer

Hoxton Square is a public garden square in the Hoxton area in the London Borough of Hackney. Laid out in 1683, it is thought to be one of the oldest in London. Since the 1990s it has been at the heart of the Hoxton national (digital and design) arts and media hub, as well as hosting entertainment, with globally eclectic musicians, actors and dancers. Most of the square's buildings, quite tall for the Victorian age, diverge in use, with many floors converted to bars, restaurants and offices and at least one live music club of note.

One of the square's 18th-century residents, Rev. John Newton, composed the popular hymn "Amazing Grace".

== History ==
Hoxton Square was laid out by Samuel Blewitt and Robert Hackshaw, who leased the land from the Austen family in 1683.

Hoxton and Charles Squares, while upper-middle class, housed many non-conformists (with Anglicanism). From 1699 to 1729 an academy, offering a wide curriculum and also allowing "free enquiry" by its students, stood against the square. Samuel Pike, who lived in one of houses, offered theological teaching from 1750. Samuel Morton Savage opened his Hoxton Square Academy there. The academy closed in 1785.

== Catholic Church and School ==
Hoxton Square is home to the Augustinian Priory, school and Church of St Monica (architect: E. W. Pugin) built 1864-66 and the first Augustinian House in England since a brief attempt at revival under Mary I of England.

== Culture ==
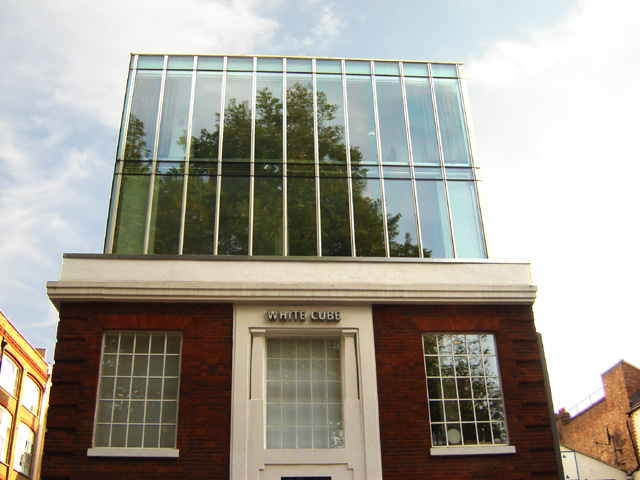
The former White Cube art gallery

Since the 1990s the square has become the heart of a nationally notable Hoxton arts and media scene, as well as being a hub of the thriving local entertainment district. It would be home to the Blue Note (formerly The Bass Clef), which was a key club for both the acid jazz and drum and bass scenes.

Between 2000 and 2012, the south side of the square was home to the White Cube art gallery, which primarily showcased newer artists such as from the movement Young British Artists.

Since the year 2000 the square's buildings, largely of Victorian vintage, have become host to bars, restaurants and offices - such as Sh! Women's Erotic Emporium. The insurance group Aviva increasingly have purchased property on the square to redevelop into what has been dubbed a "corporate campus".

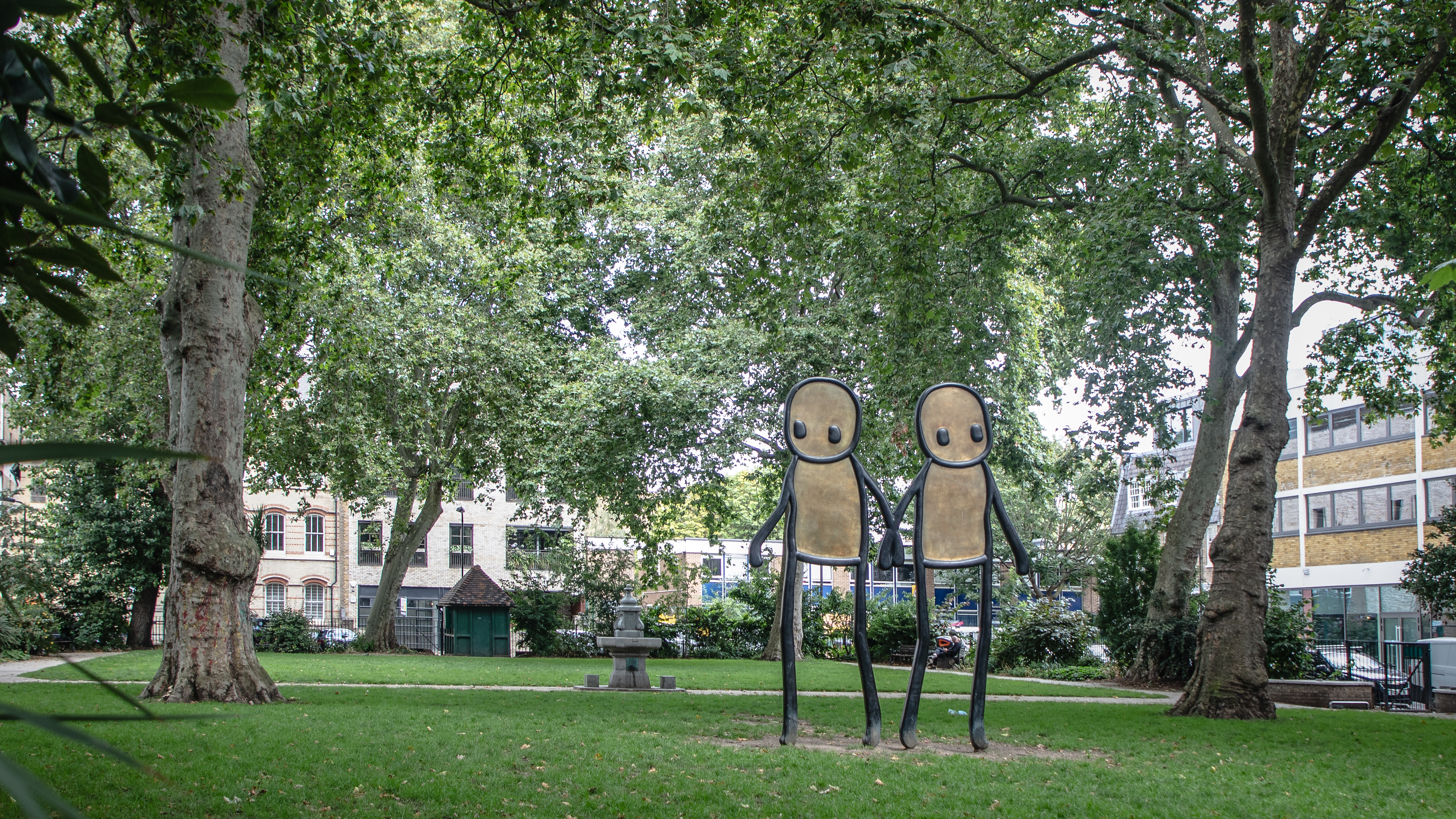
Stik's "Holding Hands" sculpture in the square

In 2020 a sculpture designed by the graffiti artist Stik was installed in the square.

== Notable people ==
The Christian theologian John Thomas, founder of the Christadelphian movement, was born at Hoxton Square in 1805, and in 1810 the square was home to Peter Durand, who filed the first patent nationally for tinning food.

One of the square's 18th-century residents, Rev. John Newton, composed the popular hymn "Amazing Grace". The parish church of St John's Hoxton is nearby, where one of Prince George's ancestors was married in the mid-19th century.

James Parkinson (1755–1824), the physician and author of An Essay on the Shaking Palsy, the subject of which is now known as Parkinson's disease, was in practice at No.1, which is commemorated with a blue plaque on the site.

== See also ==
- St John the Baptist, Hoxton
