= Ebenezer Latham =

Ebenezer Latham (c. 1688, Mickledale–1754) was an English medical doctor, teacher and dissenting minister.

== Early life ==
His father was Richard Latham (c.1653–1706), who later became a nonconformist minister at Wem. Young Ebenezer enrolled as student at Samuel Benion's academy in Shrewsbury.
