= Samuel Pike =

British clergyman

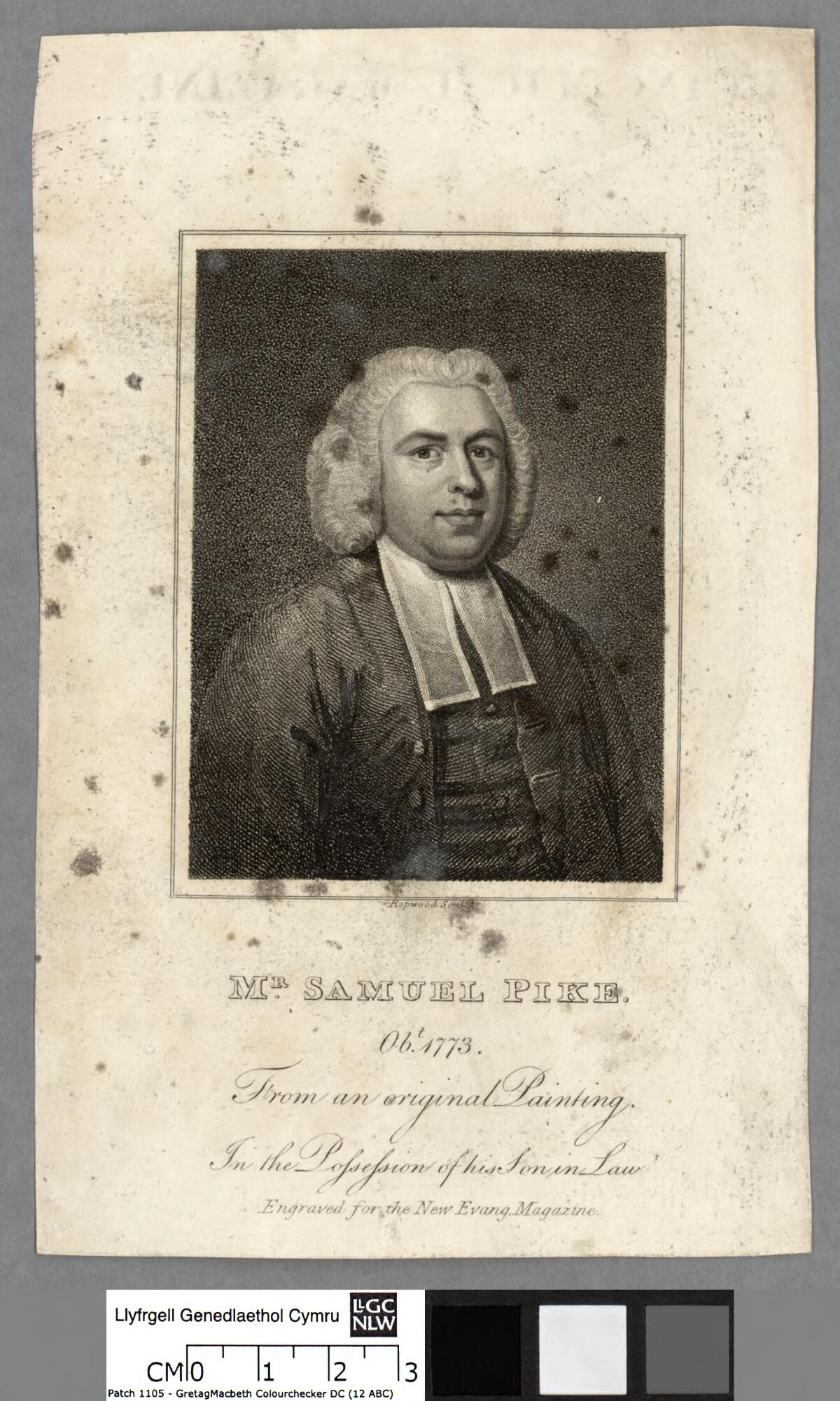
Pike as engraved for the New Evangelical Magazine

Samuel Pike (1717?–1773) was a British clergyman and a member of a religious movement known as Sandemanians.

== Life ==
Pike was born about 1717 at "Ramsey, Wiltshire" (Wilson), which may mean Ramsbury, Wiltshire, or Romsey, Hampshire. He was educated for the independent ministry, receiving his general training from John Eames of the Congregational Fund academy, and his theology from John Hubbard at Stepney Academy. His first post as a minister was at Henley-on-Thames, Oxfordshire, about 1740. He moved in 1747 to succeed John Hill (1711–1746) as pastor at the Three Cranes meeting-house in Fruiterers Alley, Thames Street, London.

Early in his London ministry Pike established, in his house on Hoxton Square, an academy for training students for the ministry. He adopted the principles of John Hutchinson (1674–1737), and defended them (1753) in a long work. In 1754 he succeeded Zephaniah Marryat, D.D. (1684?–1754), as one of the Tuesday lecturers at Pinners' Hall. About the same time he joined Samuel Hayward (1718–1757), independent minister at Silver Street, Wood Street, Cheapside, in a Sunday-evening lecture, dealing with "cases of conscience", at Little St. Helen's Church, Bishopsgate Street. His Body of Divinity (1755) was criticised by Caleb Fleming.

He was married, and left children.

== Religious views ==
In 1757 Pike became acquainted with the views of Robert Sandeman, the son-in-law and disciple of John Glas. Sandeman had published (1757) a series of Letters dealing with the Dialogues between Theron and Aspasio (1755), by James Hervey (1714–1758). The Letters were admired by members of Pike's church; and Pike, on reading them, began (17 January 1758) a correspondence with Sandeman, then in Edinburgh. The correspondence, as it proceeded, was communicated to Pike's church, with the result that he, and a section of his people, came gradually into Sandeman's views; while others showed such dissatisfaction that Pike ceased the correspondence, suppressing his fourth letter. He began, however, to adopt Glassite or Sandemanian usages, including a weekly communion. This led (August 1758) to rumours of his unsoundness; his discourses at Pinners' Hall gave offence, and he was excluded from the lectureship in 1759 by forty-four votes to one, Dr. John Conder being chosen to succeed him on 3 Oct. In his own church he was hotly opposed by William Fuller and Thomas Uffington. A church meeting (9 October 1759) came to no conclusion; church meetings on 13 January and 21 April 1760 were equally divided (seventeen votes on either side), but Pike's casting vote carried the exclusion of the malcontents, who formed a new church under Joseph Barber. Disputes then arose about possession of church property, and a lawsuit was begun (1761) by Pike for recovery of an endowment of £12 a year. At length he resigned his charge (14 December 1765), left the independents, and became a member of the Sandemanian church in Bull and Mouth Street, St. Martin's Le Grand. He was chosen "elder" in 1766, and ministered with great acceptance.

From London, Pike moved in 1771 to minister to a Sandemanian congregation at Trowbridge, Wiltshire. Unfounded reports were spread of his insobriety. Pike was a follower of the doctrines of Hutchinson, who found in scripture a system of physical science, and then became a follower of Glas, who held that biblical authority did not extend to such topics. He died at Trowbridge in January 1773, and was buried on 10 January in the parish churchyard. His portrait, engraved by Hopwood, is given in Wilson.

== Works ==
He published, besides single sermons (1748–53):

- The Book of Psalms in Metre, 1751
- Thoughts on such Phrases of Scripture as ascribe Affections and Passions to the Deity, &c., 1750, 12mo.
- Philosophia Sacra, or the Principles of Natural Philosophy. Extracted from Divine Revelation, &c., 1753, 8vo; Edinburgh, 1815, 8vo.
- Some important Cases of Conscience, &c., 1755–6, 8vo, 2 vols. ); (the substance of lectures by Pike and Hayward); Glasgow, 1762, 8vo; with title Religious Cases of Conscience, 1775, 8vo; 1807, 8vo; Romsey, 1819, 8vo; Philadelphia [1859], 12mo; with title The Doubtful Christian encouraged, &c., Woodbridge [1800], 8vo; in Welsh, 1769, 12mo.
- A form of Sound Words; or ... Body of Divinity, &c., 1755, 12mo; 1756, 12mo (based on the shorter catechism of the Westminster assembly).
- Public Fasting, &c., 1757, 12mo; 1758, 8vo.
- An Epistolary Correspondence between ... Pike and ... Sandeman, &c., 1758, 8vo; in Welsh, 1765, 12mo.
- Saving Grace, Sovereign Grace, &c., 1758, 8vo (lectures at Pinners' Hall); 1825, 8vo.
- Free Grace indeed! &c., 1759, 8vo; 1760, 12mo.
- A ... Narrative of the ... Schism in the Church under ... Pike, &c., 1760, 8vo.
- Simple Truth Vindicated, &c., 1760, 12mo (anon).
- The Nature and Evidence of Saving Faith, &c., 1764, 8vo.
- A Plain ... Account of ... Practices observed by the Church in St. Martin's-le-Grand, &c., 1766, 8vo; 1767, 12mo.
- A Compendious Hebrew Lexicon, &c., 1766, 8vo (annexed is a short grammar); Glasgow, 1802, 8vo.
