= Robert Andrews (translator) =

English clergyman, translator and poet (1723–1766)

- Born: 1723
- Died: 1766 (aged 42–43)
- Occupations: Clergyman, poet, translator
- Spouse: Hannah Hazlewood
- Writing career
- Period: 1752–1766
- Notable works: The Works of Virgil, Englished; Eidyllia, or, Miscellaneous poems

Robert Andrews (1723–1766) was an English Dissenter, known as a poet and translator of Virgil.

== Life ==
Andrews was the son of Robert Andrews of Bolton and his wife Hannah Crompton, daughter of Joseph Crompton. He was descended from an eminent nonconformist family which had lived for nearly two centuries at Little Lever and at Rivington Hall, near Bolton, Lancashire. He received his theological education at the Dissenting academy of Dr. Caleb Rotheram, at Kendal. He was chosen in 1747 minister of the Presbyterian congregation at Lydgate, in the parish of Kirkburton, Yorkshire. He continued to hold this charge till about 1753, when he became minister of Platt Chapel, a place of worship for Protestant dissenters in Rusholme, Lancashire. He stayed there about three years. In 1756 he moved to Bridgnorth, where he presided over a Presbyterian congregation. He married Hannah Haslewood but had no children. His health broke down and he became insane before his death in 1766.

== Works ==
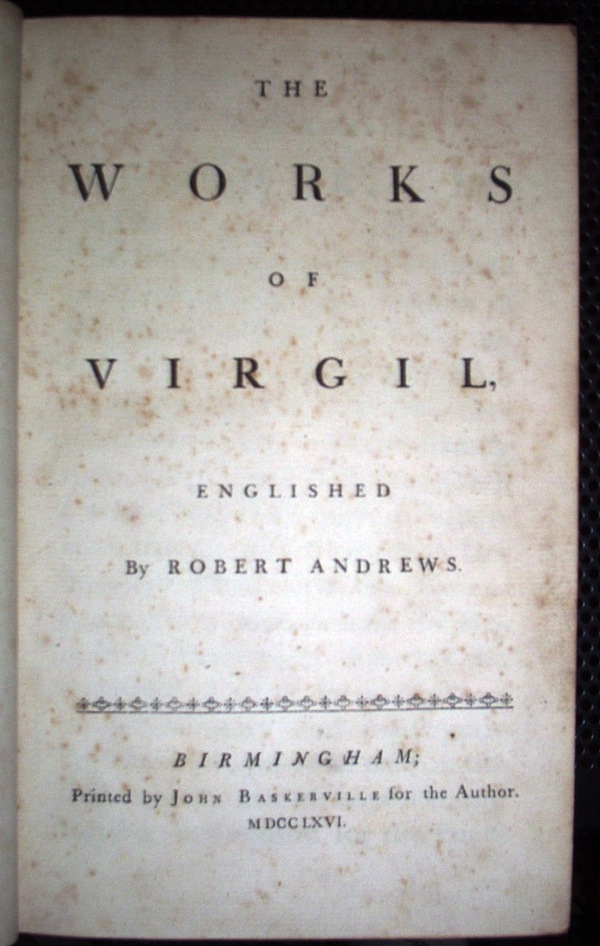
The title page of Andrews's blank verse translation of Virgil, printed by John Baskerville in 1766

In the earlier part of his life he sent to the press a criticism on the sermons of his friend, the Rev. John Holland, and some animadversions on Dr. John Brown's Essays on the Characteristics. A volume of poems, called Eidyllia and dedicated to the Hon. Charles Yorke was published in 1757; the preface contains a polemic against rhyme.

The work for which Andrews is remembered, his Virgil Englished, was published in the year of his death, 1766. It was printed by the famous Birmingham printer, John Baskerville.

The book is dedicated to the Hon. Booth Grey, who would later be the MP for Leicester from 1774 to 1784. The translation is in blank verse, with the intention of to conveying the sense of Virgil line for line. The work has since been described as an "eccentric, line–by-line, completely unreadable translation". Others have described it as "monumental and austere". On its publication, the work was considered significant enough to be reviewed in both The Critical Review and the Monthly Review

In the preface, Andrews wrote a defence of the use of blank verse and a commendation of Virgil as a defender of liberty. He describes Virgil as inspiring a spirit of liberty that finds perfection ‘under the inviolable authority of a British King and Parliament’. The work is currently available as a Print on demand publication from the Eighteenth Century Collections Online.

In the same year, Baskerville also reprinted Andrews' Odes in a Quarto edition, dedicated to Charles Yorke. This book is exceptionally rare - the English Short Title Catalogue lists only three known copies in libraries around the world, compared with around 70 known library copies of Andrews' Virgil.
