= John Jennings (tutor) =

English Nonconformist minister and tutor

John Jennings (c. 1687 – 1723) was an English Nonconformist minister and tutor of an early dissenting academy at Kibworth, Leicestershire, the original institution that became Daventry Academy. Jennings through his teaching and pedagogic writings was a major influence on the Dissenting educational tradition.

== Life ==
Jennings’s father, John Jennings (1634–1701), a native of Oswestry, Shropshire, was educated at Christ Church, Oxford, and was ejected from the rectory of Hartley Wespall, Hampshire, after the Act of Uniformity 1662. The elder John Jennings was afterwards a private chaplain at Langton, near Kibworth, and founder of the independent congregation at Kibworth, where he purchased a small estate. A younger son, David Jennings, became known as tutor of the Coward Trust academy in Wellclose Square.

Jennings was educated at Timothy Jollie's academy at Attercliffe, and succeeded his father as independent minister at Kibworth, where from 1715 he conducted a nonconformist academy. His students included Philip Doddridge, who carried on the academy tradition in various locations; others were Sir John Cope and John Mason, the writer on Self-Knowledge. In July 1722 Jennings became minister of the Presbyterian congregation at Hinckley, and moved his academy to that town, where a new meeting-house was immediately built for him. Next year he fell a victim to smallpox, and died at Hinckley on 8 July 1723.

== Pedagogy ==
The four years' course of study was documented by Doddridge, who comments on his tutor's thoroughness of method and liberality of spirit. Doddridge took Jennings's theological lectures as the basis of his own. Alexander Gordon, writing in the Dictionary of National Biography, describes John Jennings as more able and original than his brother David.

He published:

- Miscellanea in usum Juventutis Academicæ,, Northampton, 1721, a handbook to the studies of his academy.
- Logica in usum, Northampton, 1721, includes a system of phonetic shorthand.
- A Genealogical Table of the Kings of England.

Posthumous was Two Discourses, 1723, (preface by Isaac Watts); 4th edition, 1754. These were lectures on preaching; they were recommended by two bishops, and were translated into German.

== Family ==
Jennings was twice married, his second wife being Anna Letitia, daughter of Sir Francis Wingate, by Anne, daughter of Arthur Annesley, 1st Earl of Anglesey. He left four children, Arthur, John, Francis, and Jane. John, "the wit of Doddridge's academy", was minister (ordained 12 August 1742) at St. Ives, Huntingdonshire, and left the ministry about 1756 from a failure of speech. Jane married John Aikin, and became the mother of Anna Letitia Barbauld.
