= Samuel Benion =

Samuel Benion (1673–1708) born in Whixall, Shropshire in 1696 became the first medical doctor from Glasgow University.
