= Benjamin Fawcett (minister) =

English dissenting minister

Personal life
- Born: August 16, 1715 Sleaford, Lincolnshire, England
- Died: 1780
- Children: Samuel Fawcett
- Notable works: The Grand Enquiry (1756); Candid Reflections on the ... Trinity (1777); Observations on the Causes and Cure of Religious Melancholy (1780)
- Education: Philip Doddridge's Academy, Northampton
- Occupation: Dissenting minister

Religious life
- Religion: Dissenting Christianity
- Church: Paul's Meeting, Taunton; Kidderminster

Benjamin Fawcett (1715–1780) was an English dissenting minister.

== Life ==
Fawcett was born at Sleaford, Lincolnshire, on 16 August 1715, the youngest of ten children. He entered Philip Doddridge's dissenting academy at Northampton in 1738. In March 1741 Doddridge sent him to Whitchurch and Chester to collect evidence for an alibi in the case of Bryan Connell, then under sentence of death for murder (executed 3 April). In the same year Fawcett became minister of Paul's Meeting, Taunton, where he was ordained on 16 June 1742, forty ministers being present. Doddridge went down to take part in the ordination, and was presented to Fawcett's future wife.

In 1745 Fawcett moved to Kidderminster. Here Doddridge visited him in 1747, and found his ministry prospering: he had 316 catechumens. He seems to have retained his popularity to the close of his life. He was very zealous in founding country congregations. Some of his notions were unconventional. Job Orton, who retired to Kidderminster in 1766, was scandalised when a drum-major of the Northamptonshire militia was allowed to preach in Fawcett's pulpit.

In July 1780 Fawcett was prostrated by illness; the disease was supposed to be the stone, but was in reality an ulcer. He died in October. His funeral sermon was preached on 18 October by Thomas Tayler of Carter Lane. On his death his congregation divided, the Independents retaining the meeting-house, and an Arian secession building a new place of worship.

== Works ==
For the use of his congregations he published abridgments of many of Richard Baxter's writings, and edited other religious works.

Between 1756 and 1774 Fawcett published many sermons, the first being The Grand Enquiry, 1756. These also included the funeral sermon for Risdon Darracott in 1759. His major pieces were:

- Candid Reflections on the different manner in which the learned and pious have expressed their conceptions concerning the doctrine of the Trinity, Shrewsbury, 1777; second edition, enlarged, Shrewsbury, 1778; an "appendix" to the second edition, Shrewsbury, 1780. These were in a letter to a friend, probably Orton. The publication is irenic in design, its main point being the diversity of ways in which the doctrine of the Trinity may be stated. Orton, who saw the manuscript, warned Fawcett that its publication "would for ever ruin his reputation among the warm, zealous people". It led to a controversy with William Fuller, an independent layman, which was continued by Samuel Palmer after Fawcett's death.
- Observations on the Causes and Cure of ... Religious Melancholy, Shrewsbury, 1780.

== Family ==
Fawcett's son Samuel was ordained at Beaminster, Dorset in 1777; he became a Unitarian, and retired from the ministry, living on his private estate near Bridport. From 1801 to 1816 he was Unitarian minister at Yeovil, where he died on 14 December 1835, aged 81.
