= Daniel Neal =

English historian (1678–1743)

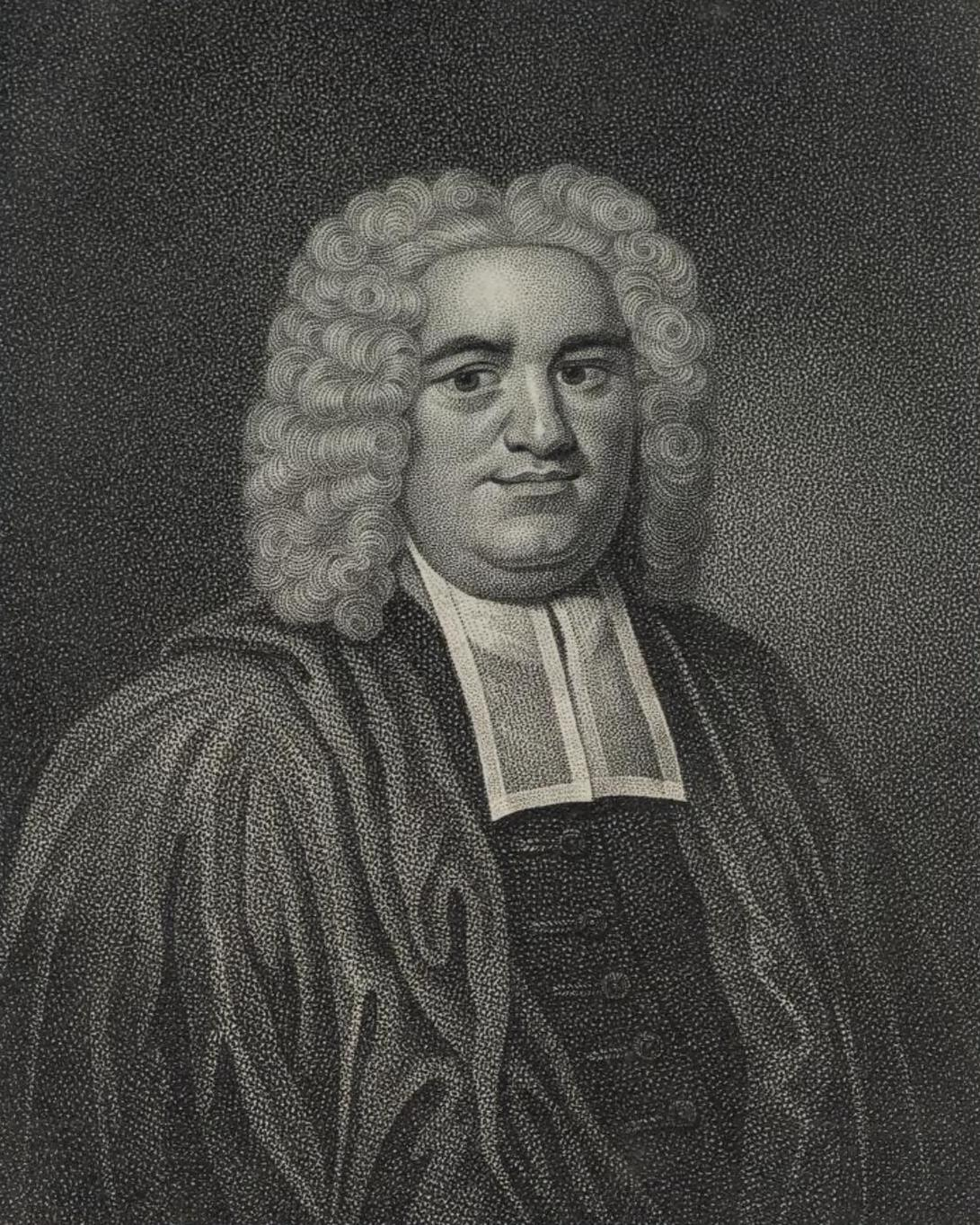
Portrait of Neal by William Holl the Elder

Daniel Neal (14 December 1678 – 4 April 1743) was an English historian.

== Biography ==
Born in London, he was educated at the Merchant Taylors' School, and at the universities of Utrecht and Leiden. In 1704 he became assistant minister, and in 1706 sole minister, of an independent congregation worshipping in Aldersgate Street, and afterwards in Jewin Street, London, where he remained almost until his death. He married Elizabeth Lardner (d. 1748), by whom he had one son, Nathanael, and two daughters.

In 1720 Neal published his History of New England, which obtained for its author the honorary degree of MA from Harvard College. He also undertook to assist Dr John Evans in writing a history of Nonconformity. Evans, however, died in 1730, and, making use of his papers for the period before 1640, Neal wrote the whole of the work himself.

This History of the Puritans deals with the time between the Protestant Reformation and 1689; the first volume appearing in 1732, and the fourth and last in 1738. The first volume was attacked in 1733 for unfairness and inaccuracy by Isaac Maddox, afterwards bishop of St Asaph and bishop of Worcester, to whom Neal replied in a pamphlet, A Review of the principal facts objected to in the first volume of the History of the Puritans; and the remaining volumes by Zachary Grey (1688–1766), to whom the author made no reply.

The History of the Puritans was edited, in five volumes, by Dr Joshua Toulmin (1740–1815), who added a life of Neal in 1797. This was reprinted in 1817, and an edition in two volumes was published in New York in 1844.

== Additional Literature ==
- Bracy V. Hill II: Faithful Accounts? The Hampton Court Conference and The King James Bible in Early Eighteenth-Century Dissenting Histories. In: Reformation 16, 2011. S. 113–144. Online: <https://web.archive.org/web/20160518203311/http://essential.metapress.com/content/t524766nn78131p0/fulltext.pdf>
- Bracy V. Hill II: Suffering for their Consciences: The Depiction of Anabaptists and Baptists in the Eighteenth-Century Histories of Daniel Neal. In: Welsh Journal of Religious History 5, 2010. S. 84–113. Reprint Online In "The Baptist History & Heritage" 9, no. 3 (Fall 2014): 39-67 : <http://www.thefreelibrary.com/Suffering+for+their+consciences%3a+the+depiction+of+anabaptists+and...-a0393654230>
- Laird Okie: Daniel Neal and the "Puritan Revolution". In: Church History 55:4, 1986. S. 456–467.
- Laird Okie: Neal, Daniel (1678–1743). In: Oxford Dictionary of National Biography, Oxford University Press, 2004. Online: <http://www.oxforddnb.com/view/article/19817>
- John Seed: Dissenting Histories: Religious Division and The Politics of Memory in Eighteenth-Century England. Edinburgh University Press, Edinburgh 2008. ISBN 0748621512
- Joshua Toulmin: Memoir of the Life of Daniel Neal, A.M.. In: Daniel Neal: The History of the Puritans, or Protestant Nonconformists. Hrsg. von Joshua Toulmin, durchgesehen und annotiert von John O. Choules. Harper & Brothers, New York 1843.
- Walter Wilson: The History and Antiquities of Dissenting Churches and Meeting Houses, in London, Westminster, and Southwark: Including the Lives of Their Ministers, from the Rise of Nonconformity to the Present Time: With an Appendix on the Origin, Progress, and Present State of Christianity in Britain. 4 Bände. W. Button, London 1814. Bes. Band III, S. 91ff.
