= Christian Reformer =

British Unitarian magazine

The Christian Reformer, or New Evangelical Miscellany was a British Unitarian magazine established in 1815 and edited by Robert Aspland. It was headquartered in London.

The Christian Reformer was published monthly until 1863 and a different Unitarian journal appeared during 1886–1887 with the same title.
