= Thomas Cogan =

English Nonconformist physician

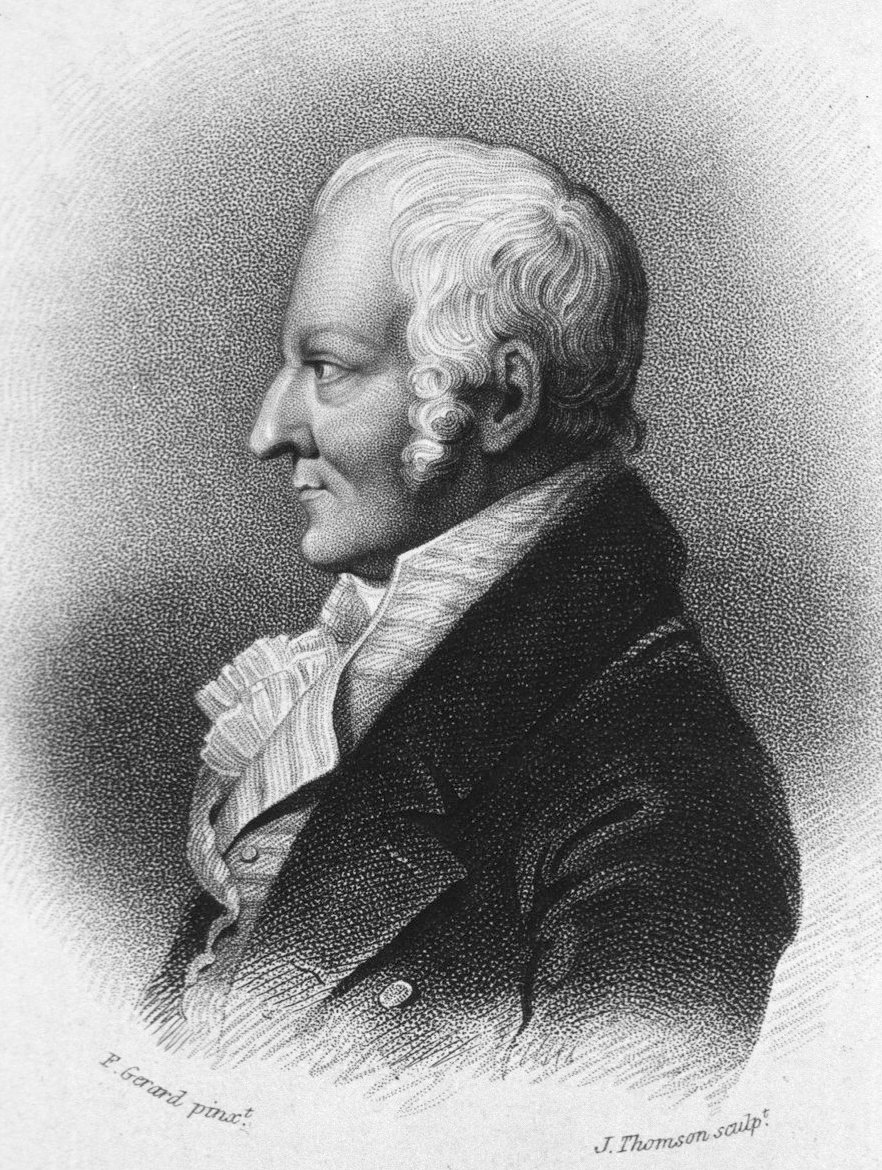
- Drawing of Cogan by Petrus Camper
- Born: 8 February 1736; Rothwell, Northamptonshire, England
- Died: 2 February 1818 (aged 81)
- Occupations: Physician; Philosophical writer
- Organization: Royal Humane Society

Thomas Cogan (8 February 1736 – 2 February 1818) was an English Nonconformist physician, a founder of the Royal Humane Society and philosophical writer.

== Life ==
Thomas Cogan was born at Rothwell, Northamptonshire on 8 February 1736, the half-brother of Eliezer Cogan. For two or three years he was placed in the dissenting academy at Kibworth Beauchamp, run by John Aikin, but was removed at the age of fourteen, and spent the next two years with his father. He was then sent to the Mile End academy, where John Conder was the divinity tutor, but was transferred at his own request to a similar institution at Homerton. Doubts as to the truth of the doctrines of Calvinism prevented him from joining the dissenting ministry.

In 1759 he was in the Netherlands, where he found that the Rev. Benjamin Sowden, the English minister of the presbyterian church at Rotterdam, supported by the English and Dutch governments with two pastors, required a substitute; Cogan applied for and obtained the place. He continued to seek for a pastorate over a dissenting congregation in England, and about 1762 he was selected as the minister of a chapel at Southampton, where he soon publicly renounced Calvinism and adopted the doctrines of Unitarianism. A quarrel with his congregation followed, and Cogan became the junior minister of the English church at the Hague. He was introduced to Mr. Graen or Groen, originally a silversmith at Amsterdam, and afterwards a banker, and was wooed and won, as the story goes, by the banker's only daughter, a beauty and an heiress. It was a condition of the marriage that Cogan should enter the profession of medicine, and he accordingly matriculated at Leyden University on 16 October 1765, and took his degree of M.D. in 1767. He practised for a few years at Amsterdam, Leyden, and Rotterdam.

He returned to London and settled in Paternoster Row, where he soon obtained a lucrative practice, especially in midwifery. By 1780 he was once more in the Netherlands, having resigned his connection to Dr. John Sims, for many years the leading accoucheur in London, and retired to follow his studies in moral philosophy. They rented the mansion of Zuylestein, where they dwelt until the invasion by the French republicans in 1795. After a time at Colchester they settled at Bath, Somerset. Cogan rented a farm at South Wraxall, near Bradford-on-Avon and studied agriculture; when he left Bath he took farms at Clapton and at Woodford, and at the time of his death he was the tenant of a farm near Southampton. Mrs. Cogan died at Bath in 1810 and was buried at Widcombe; Cogan later moved to London. The last years of his life were mainly passed in his lodgings in London or at his brother's house at Higham Hill. He died there on 2 February 1818. On 9 February he was buried at Hackney.

== Royal Humane Society ==
A society for the preservation of life from accidents in water was instituted at Amsterdam in 1767, and became known to Cogan. On his return to England he found that Dr. William Hawes had a similar project, and the two doctors co-operated. Each of them brought 15 friends to a meeting at the Chapter Coffee-house in St. Paul's Churchyard in the summer of 1774, when the Royal Humane Society was formed. Cogan translated from the original Dutch in 1773 the Memoirs of the Society instituted at Amsterdam in favour of Drowned Persons, 1767–71, and prepared the first six annual reports of the English society. His interest in this charitable work lasted throughout his life. He started a branch at Bath in 1805, and left the mother-foundation in his will the sum of £100. One of the five gold medals minted for the society is inscribed to the memory of Cogan, and in its annual report for 1814 is a portrait of him, with a eulogy of his talents as an author and the co-founder.

== Works ==
Cogan's thesis for his medical degree at Leyden was delivered there on 20 February 1767, and printed in the same year. It was entitled Specimen Medicum inaugurale de animi pathematum vi et modo agendi in inducendis et curandis morbis. His next publication was an anonymous account of John Buncle, junior, gentleman, 1776, which purported to be a memoir of the youngest son of Thomas Amory's whimsical creation of John Buncle, by his seventh wife, Miss Dunk. In 1793 he published, without his name, two volumes entitled The Rhine; or, a Journey from Utrech to Francfort, described in a series of letters in 1791 and 1792; it was republished in 1794 with his name on the title-page, and there was a Dutch translation published at Haarlem in 1800. This translation of Cogan's work into Dutch was balanced by his translating into English from that language in 1794 the work of Peter Camper, On the Connexion between the Science of Anatomy and the Arts of Drawing, Painting, Statuary.

He also wrote elaborate treatises on the passions. The first of them bore the name of A Philosophical Treatise on the Passions, 1800, 2nd edit. 1802. Then succeeded an Ethical Treatise on the Passions, in two parts, the first of which appeared in 1807 and the second in 1810. Two volumes of Theological Disquisitions on Religion as affecting the Passions and on the Characteristic Excellencies of Christianity followed in 1812 and 1813 respectively, and the whole five treatises were published in a set in 1813. Last of all came in 1817 a bundle of Ethical Questions, or Speculations on the principal subjects of Controversy in Moral Philosophy. His plan was "to trace the moral history of man in his pursuits, power, and motives of action." A long analysis of Cogan's writings is in Jared Sparks's Collection of Essays and Tracts in Theology (1824), which also contains (pp. 237–362) a reprint of his Letters to William Wilberforce on the doctrine of Hereditary Depravity, by a Layman (pseud. i.e. T. Cogan), in which he denounced the view supported by William Wilberforce in his Practical View of the prevailing Religious Systems of Professed Christians, and argued for the happiness of all mankind. These letters originally appeared in 1799, and were printed in cheap editions for Unitarian book societies. A fragment of his Disquisition on the Characteristic Excellencies of Christianity was appended in 1822 to a discourse by Lant Carpenter. NOTE* The above statement about the 2 volumes of "The Rhine a Journey from Utrecht to Francfort", etc. 1793. I believe was not published at stated above in 1793 as the advertisement leaf in the 1794 1st edition dated january 1794 states clearly his reason for NOT publishing it anonymously as it might be taken for a work by a "fabulist" or tale teller and NOT a true travelogue. I doubt very much the statement above to be correct all 6 copies held in The British Library are dated 1794, bar two electronic/virtual copies which are taken from the one source.
