= Caleb Rotheram =

English dissenting minister and tutor

Caleb Rotheram D.D. (1694–1752) was an English dissenting minister and tutor.

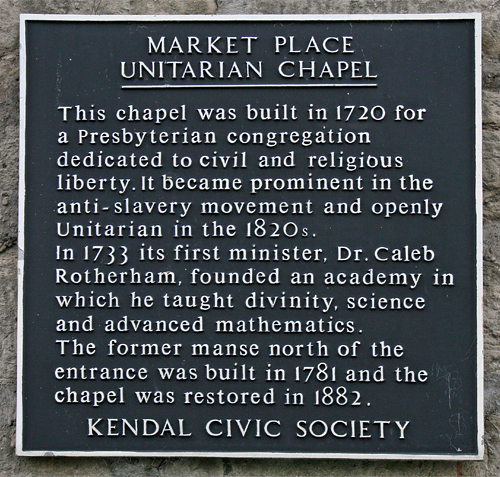
Plaque in Kendal

== Life ==
He was born on 7 March 1694 at Great Salkeld, Cumberland. He was educated at the grammar school of Great Blencow, Cumberland, under Anthony Ireland, and prepared for the Presbyterian ministry in the academy of Thomas Dixon at Whitehaven. In 1716 he became minister of the dissenting congregation at Kendal, Westmorland.

After Dixon's death (1729) he took up from 1733 the work of a dissenting academy at Kendal, where he educated about 120 laymen, including Jeremiah Dyson, and fifty-six divinity students, among whom was George Walker. In 1743 he visited Edinburgh, where he was admitted M.A., and gained the degree of D.D. by public disputation on 27 May.

His theology, and that of most of his divinity pupils, was Arian. In 1751 his health failed; leaving his congregation and academy in charge of Richard Simpson, he went to Hexham, Northumberland, to stay with his eldest son, a physician. He died at Hexham on 8 June 1752, and was buried in the south aisle of the abbey church, where was a mural monument to his memory.

== Works ==
Rotheram published ‘Dissertatio … de Religionis Christianæ Evidentia,’ &c., Edinburgh, 1743.

== Family ==
His second son was in the army. His third son, Caleb (1738–1796), educated at Kendal (the academy ceased in 1753) and Daventry Academy, was ordained minister of Kendal on 21 April 1756; he was a friend and correspondent of Joseph Priestley, and was apparently the first unitarian minister who officiated (1781) in Scotland. His grandson, Edward Rotheram, was a senior officer of the British Royal Navy.

== Notes ==
Attribution

This article incorporates text from a publication now in the public domain: "Rotheram, Caleb". Dictionary of National Biography. London: Smith, Elder & Co. 1885–1900.
