= John Aikin (Unitarian) =

English Unitarian scholar and theologian tutor (1713–1780)

- Born: 1713; London, England
- Died: 1780 (aged 66–67)

John Aikin (1713–1780) was an English Unitarian scholar and theological tutor, closely associated with Warrington Academy, a prominent dissenting academy.

== Life ==
Aikin was born in 1713 in London. His father, a linen-draper, came originally from Kirkcudbright, in southern Scotland. He was placed for a short time as French clerk in a mercantile house, but entered Kibworth Academy, then run by Philip Doddridge, for whom Aikin was the first pupil. He then went to Aberdeen University, where the anti-Calvinist opinions of the tutors gradually led him to Low Arianism, as it was then called, which afterwards became the distinguishing feature of the Warrington Academy. Aberdeen subsequently conferred upon him the degree of D.D.

Returning from Aberdeen, he was ordained, and after a short period of work as Doddridge's assistant, he accepted a dissenting congregation at Market Harborough. Bad health made him take up teaching; he tutored Thomas Belsham at Kibworth, which lies between Market Harborough and Leicester; other pupils of Aikin were Newcome Cappe (at an earlier period), Thomas Cogan, and Thomas Simpson.

At Warrington Academy he was one of the first three tutors in 1757, teaching classics. In 1761, Aikin became tutor in divinity, and was succeeded in his old duties by Joseph Priestley. Priestley says of the tutors: ‘We were all Arians, and the only subject of much consequence on which we differed respected the doctrine of Atonement, concerning which Dr. Aikin held some obscure notions.’

Aikin's health began to fail in 1778; soon afterwards he resigned his tutorship, and died in 1780.

== Family ==
Aikin married Jane, daughter of John Jennings, founder of the academy at Kibworth and a teacher who was influential on the dissenting educational tradition. Their two children were John Aikin, physician and author, and Anna Letitia Barbauld, an author and literary critic who published in multiple genres, including poetry, essays, and children's literature.
