= James Yates (minister) =

English unitarian minister (1789–1871)

James Yates (30 April 1789 – 7 May 1871) was an English Unitarian minister and scholar, known as an antiquary.

== Life ==
He was the fourth son of John Yates (1755–1826) by his wife Elizabeth (1750–1819), youngest daughter of John Ashton of Liverpool, and widow of John Bostock the elder (cf John Bostock (physician)), and was born in Toxteth Park, Liverpool, on 30 April 1789. Joseph Brooks Yates was his eldest brother; another brother, Richard Vaughan Yates (4 August 1785 – 30 November 1856) was the donor of Prince's Park to the inhabitants of Liverpool, while John Ashton Yates became an MP. His father, minister (1777–1823) of the dissenting congregation in Kaye Street, Liverpool, which moved to Paradise Street (1791), was a noted preacher.

Receiving early training from William Shepherd, he entered Glasgow University in 1805, and went on for his divinity course (1808) to Manchester College, then at York, under Charles Wellbeloved. While still a student he acted (1809–10) as assistant classical tutor for John Kenrick. From York he went to Edinburgh University (1810), and Glasgow University again (1811). Before graduating M.A. at Glasgow (1812), he became unordained minister (October 1811) of a Unitarian congregation, for which a new chapel was opened (15 November 1812) in Union Place; he create a stable church out of previously discordant elements. With Thomas Southwood Smith, he founded (28 July 1813) the Scottish Unitarian Association.

On 6 April 1817 he succeeded Joshua Toulmin as colleague to John Kentish at the new meeting, Birmingham (see also Church of the Messiah, Birmingham), a post which he resigned at the end of 1825; and for a time he left the ministry, and resided at Norton Hall, near Sheffield. In 1827 he spent a semester at the University of Berlin, as a student of classical philology.

In 1819 Yates was elected a fellow of the Geological Society; in 1822 of the Linnean Society; in 1831 of the Royal Society; and in 1831 he was appointed secretary to the council of the British Association. In the same year he was elected a trustee of Daniel Williams's foundations (resigned 26 June 1861). In 1832 he succeeded John Scott Porter as minister of Carter Lane Chapel, Doctors' Commons, London. His congregation was increased by a secession (September 1834) from the ministry of William Johnson Fox at South Place Chapel, Finsbury. Yates resigned early in the following year. He remained a member of the Presbyterian section of the "general body" of ministers of the three denominations, and when other unitarians seceded in 1836, Yates retained his connection with the "general body".

Shortly Yates left the ministry, and, being unordained, took the style of a layman. He worked for Williams's trust, introducing the system of competitive examinations for scholarships. His later years were spent in learned leisure at Lauderdale House, Highgate where he had a library and a collection of works of art. He was probably the first to see the antiquarian value of the book Sketches at Carnac (Brittany) in 1834 authored by his friend Alexander Blair and Francis Ronalds and ensured it was preserved in the Royal Archaeological Institute's collection. He also helped examine the important fossil Cycadeoidea gibsoniana found by Ronalds’ cousin Thomas Field Gibson.

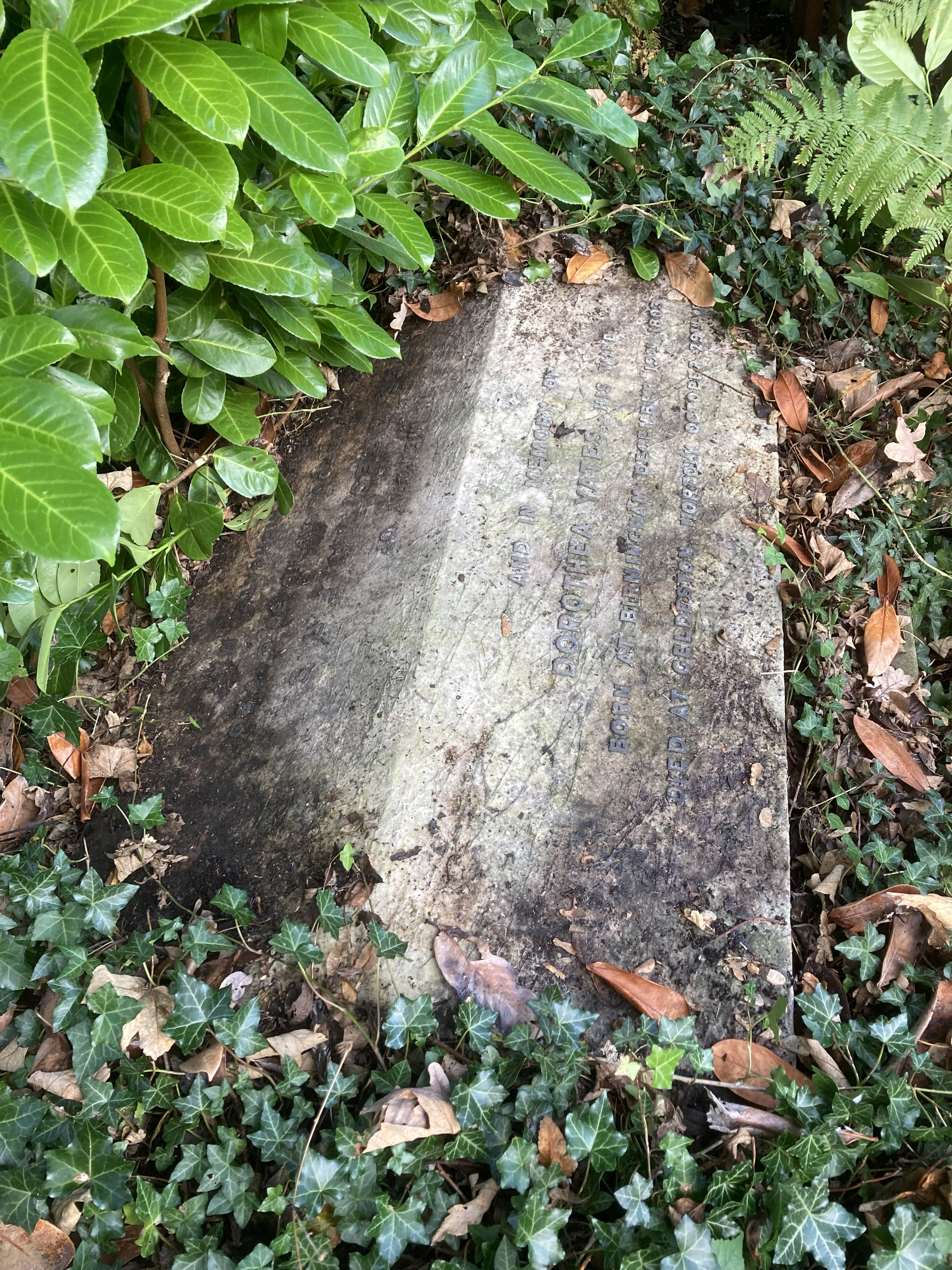
Grave of James Yates in Highgate Cemetery

Yates died at Lauderdale House on 7 May 1871, and was buried on the eastern side of Highgate Cemetery (grave no.18078) on 11 May. He married (about 1820) Dorothea, daughter of John William Crompton of Edgbaston, who survived him without issue. His will left benefactions including endowments for chairs in University College, London, but his property did not realise the estimated amount.

== Works ==
In 1814 Ralph Wardlaw delivered the series of pulpit addresses later published as Discourses on the Principal Points of the Socinian Controversy (1814). Yates had heard them given, and, on their appearance in print, published his Vindication of Unitarianism, 1815, (4th edit. 1850). On this, Strictures (1814) were published by John Brown. Wardlaw replied in Unitarianism incapable of Vindication, 1816, to which Yates rejoined in A Sequel, 1816. His position was broad, his aim being to take common ground on which Arians and Socinians could unite. His biblical conservatism, which he maintained, was criticised in the Prospective Review, 1851, p. 50.

Yates issued (1833) proposals for an organisation of the Unitarian congregations of Great Britain on the presbyterian model; the plan was abortive, though it obtained the support of John Relly Beard, Joseph Hunter, and John James Tayler. In the course of the Hewley case, Sir Lancelot Shadwell had condemned the Improved Version of the New Testament, issued (1808) by Unitarians. Yates wrote A Letter to the Vice-chancellor, 1834, defending the version, which produced a reply by Robert Halley.

Apart from Leonhard Schmitz, Yates was the largest contributor to the Dictionary of Greek and Roman Antiquities, 1842, edited by William Smith; he furnished drawings for one half of the woodcuts, and wrote one-eighth of the text. Only the first part, with appendices, of his Textrinum Antiquorum (1843) was published. Papers on archæological subjects were contributed by him to the learned societies of London and Liverpool; among reprints of these are papers on The Use of the terms Acanthus, Acanthion, 1845 (from the Classical Museum); Account of a Roman Sepulchre at Geldestone, 1849; The Use of Bronze Celts, 1849; and Observations on the Bulla worn by Roman Boys, 1851, (from the Archæological Journal); Some Account of a Volume containing Portions of "Ptolemy's Geography," 1864 (from Transactions of the Royal Society of Literature). He became a strong advocate of the decimal system; among many tracts on this subject, he published a Narrative of the … Formation of the International Association for … a Uniform Decimal System, 1856 (two editions); What is the Best Unit of Length, Hackney, 1858; Handbook to … Synoptic Table … of the Metric System, Edinburgh, 1864.

Among Yates's other publications were:

- ‘Thoughts on the Advancement of Academical Education,’ 1826; 2nd ed. 1827.
- ‘Outlines of a Constitution for the University of London,’ 1832.
- ‘Observations on Lord John Russell's Bill … with the Outlines of a Plan for registering Births, Deaths, and Marriages,’ 1836; ‘Postscript,’ 1836.
- ‘Preces e Liturgiis Ecclesiæ Catholicæ Romanæ desumptæ: cum earundem Versione Anglica … Accedunt Versiones … novæ … Germanica et Polonica,’ 1838 (Polish version by Stephen Mazoch).
- 'Memorials of Dr. Priestley' (1860): a descriptive catalogue of portraits and relics of Priestley, exhibited that year at Dr. Williams's Library, Red Cross Street, including Yates's own collection, which was presented to the Royal Society by his widow in June 1871.
- 'Descriptive Catalogue of … Current Coins of all Countries in the International Exhibition,' 1862.

A quarto manuscript containing 186 biographies of students at Glasgow on Williams's foundation, compiled by Yates, was presented to Williams's Library by his widow.
