= John Yates (minister) =

English minister (1755–1826)

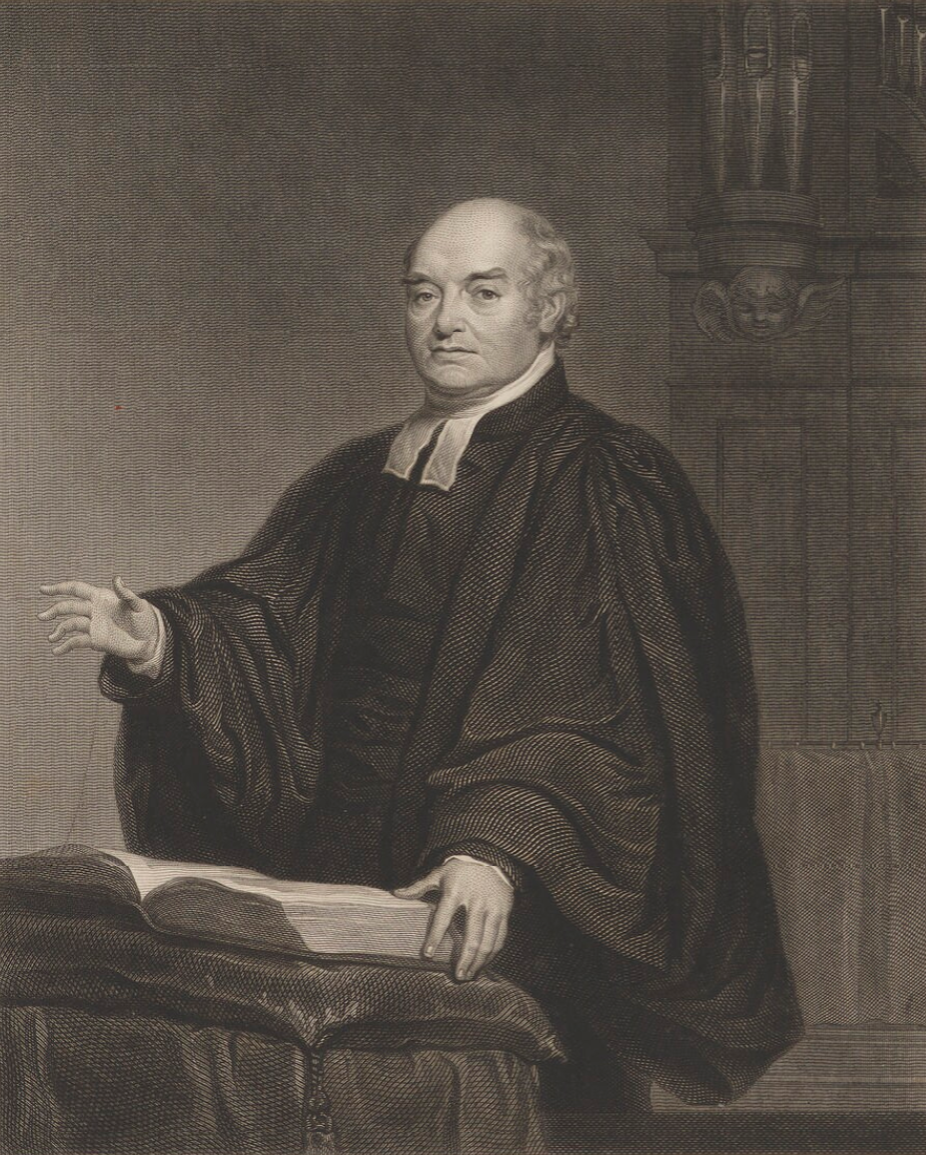
John Yates

John Yates (1755–1826) was an English Unitarian minister, for over 30 years at the Paradise Street Chapel in Liverpool. He was an abolitionist, a supporter of radical causes, and a member of the Roscoe circle of progressives.

== Life ==
He was born in Bolton, the only child of John Yates, a schoolmaster. He was educated at Bolton Grammar School, and from 1772 at Warrington Academy.

In 1777 Yates became the minister of the Kaye Street Chapel, Liverpool.

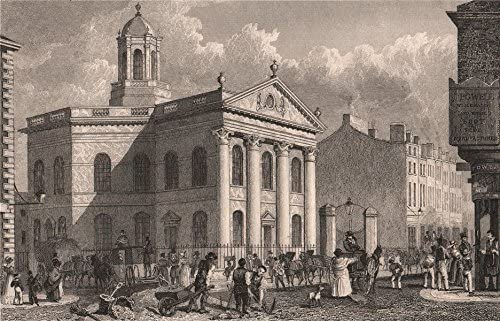
Paradise Street Chapel, Liverpool, 1829 engraving

With his friend William Shepherd, who tutored his children, Yates was active in Liverpool's radical politics. He preached against the Atlantic slave trade in 1788, offending some of his congregation. He took part in the private meetings of the "Friends of Freedom" from 1789, a group including William Roscoe and William Rathbone IV. Yates and his congregation moved to the Paradise Street Chapel in 1791.

Yates was active on the committee of The Lyceum. He was one of the supporters of Manchester College. He died on 10 November 1826 at Dingle Head.

== Family ==
In 1777 Yates married Elizabeth Bostock née Ashton, widow of the physician John Bostock the elder (1740–1774), a student of William Cullen. She was a daughter of the merchant John Ashton (1711–1759), and mother of John Bostock the younger. John and Elizabeth had a family of five sons and three daughters.

The sons were:

- Joseph Brooks Yates (1780–1855), merchant and plantation owner. John Yates had a covert interest in France, Fletcher & Co., in which Joseph Brooks Yates became a partner in 1801.
- John Ashton Yates (1781–1863), politician.
- Richard Vaughan Yates (1785–1856), donor of Prince's Park to the inhabitants of Liverpool.
- James Yates (minister) (1789–1871), Unitarian minister.
- Pemberton Heywood Yates (1791–1822).

The daughters were Elizabeth, Anna Maria (1787–1866) and Jane Ellen (1794–1877). Anna and Jane were commemorated by a tablet in Toxteth Unitarian Chapel.
