= John Ashton Yates =

British and Irish politician (1781-1863)

John Ashton Yates FRSA

Member of Parliament for County Carlow
- In office 1837–1841 Serving with Nicholas Aylward Vigors, Henry Bruen
- Preceded by: Nicholas Aylward Vigors; Henry Bruen
- Succeeded by: Henry Bruen; Thomas Bunbury

Personal details
- Born: 21 June 1781
- Died: 1 November 1863 (aged 82)
- Party: Whig
- Relations: James Yates (brother); Joseph Brooks Yates (brother); John Bostock (half-brother); William James (cousin)
- Parent(s): John Yates; Elizabeth Ashton Bostock
- Education: Manchester Academy

John Ashton Yates FRSA (21 June 1781 – 1 November 1863) was a British Whig politician and railroad investor.

== Early life ==
He was a son of Elizabeth (née Ashton) Bostock Yates and John Yates, a prominent Unitarian minister who served at Kaye Street Chapel in Liverpool, later known as Paradise Street Chapel. Among his siblings were brothers Joseph Brooks Yates, a merchant, and James Yates, a minister and scholar; both brothers were prominent antiquaries.

His father was the only child of John Yates, a schoolmaster, and his mother was the youngest daughter of merchant John Brooks Ashton of Woolton Hall near Liverpool, and the widow of physician John Bostock. From his mother's first marriage, he had an elder half-brother, John Bostock, who was also a physician. William James, who was also an MP, was his cousin.

Yates was educated by a Unitarian minister, William Shepherd, at Gateacre, Liverpool, before he studied commerce at the Presbyterian-run Manchester Academy. His teachers included Thomas Barnes, the minister of Cross Street Chapel, and John Dalton. He was particularly close to Dalton, who had previously taught his father at the Academy and with whom he went on a walking tour.

== Career ==
He was apprenticed to the firm run by the William Rathbone family. (Note: Another contemporary apprentice at the Rathbone firm with whom Yates remained friends was Thomas Bolton, who later became mayor of Liverpool.) One of his contemporaries there was Thomas Bolton, who also had a political career ahead of him. Yates became a merchant and broker in Liverpool. The firm of Yates and Cox, iron merchants and nail manufacturers, was a partnership with his brothers, Richard Vaughan Yates, who established Prince's Park, Liverpool, and Pemberton Heywood Yates. In 1830, he was one of the initial proprietors of the Wigan Branch Railway, the Manchester and Leeds Railway and in 1836 the Blackwall Railway.

Yates stood unsuccessfully for the Bolton seat in Lancashire at the 1832 general election. He was the Whig Party Member of Parliament (MP) for County Carlow, Ireland, between 1837 and 1841, but lost his Carlow seat in the 1841 contest.

=== Interests ===
In 1820, Yates was elected a Fellow of the Royal Society of Arts, and wrote several books related to the Corn Laws and economics. Despite his own involvement in slavery, he also wrote in opposition to it. His interest in old paintings and engravings, which he collected, was influenced by William Roscoe, who was another Unitarian MP from Liverpool. He was also a member of the Liverpool Literary and Philosophical Society from its origin in 1812; their obituary described his art collection as "one of the finest private minor collections in the metropolis".

Probably a member of Renshaw Street Chapel in Liverpool, Yates served as president of the British and Foreign Unitarian Association in 1841 and 1856. Throughout his life, he retained a connection to the Academy, which became known as Manchester New College; he served as an official of it.

== Personal life ==
Yates was married to Frances-Mary Lovett, a daughter of Francis Mary (née Gervais) Lovett and the Rev. Verney Lovett, Rector of Lismore (a brother of Sir Jonathan Lovett, 1st Baronet). Together, they lived at Dingle Head, Toxteth Park, and were the parents of five daughters:

- Frances Mary Yates (d. 1895), who married Sir Richard Musgrave, 4th Baronet of Tourin, a son of Sir Richard Musgrave, Bt, in 1845.
- Mary Ellen Yates (1822–1897), who was the second wife of Robert Needham Philips, MP for Bury, whose first wife had been a cousin to Mary, being the daughter of Yates' brother, Joseph.
- Ellen-Mellissina Yates, who died young.
- Isabella Yates, who died unmarried.
- Sophia Yates (1827–1900), who married to Louis Tennyson-d'Eyncourt, a cousin of the poet Alfred, Lord Tennyson, and the youngest son of the Charles Tennyson-d'Eyncourt of Bayons Manor, MP.

Yates died at Philips' house in Manchester on 1 November 1863, having suffered from a declining memory for the previous two years.

=== Descendants ===
Through his daughter Frances, he was a grandfather of Maria Musgrave, who married Hon. Cosby Godolphin Trench, the second son of Frederick Trench, 2nd Baron Ashtown. Their grandson, Nigel Trench, became the 7th Baron Ashtown, and married, as his second wife, Dorothea Mary Elizabeth (née Minchin) von Pless (the former wife of Hans Heinrich XVII Wilhelm Albert Eduard, 4th Prince of Pless).

Parliament of the United Kingdom
Preceded by Nicholas Aylward Vigors; Henry Bruen	Member of Parliament for County Carlow; 1837–1841; With: Nicholas Aylward Vigors to 1840; Henry Bruen from 1840	Succeeded by Henry Bruen; Thomas Bunbury
