= Thomas Stewart Traill =

Scottish physician, chemist, mineralogist, meteorologist, zoologist, and scholar

Thomas Stewart Traill FRSE
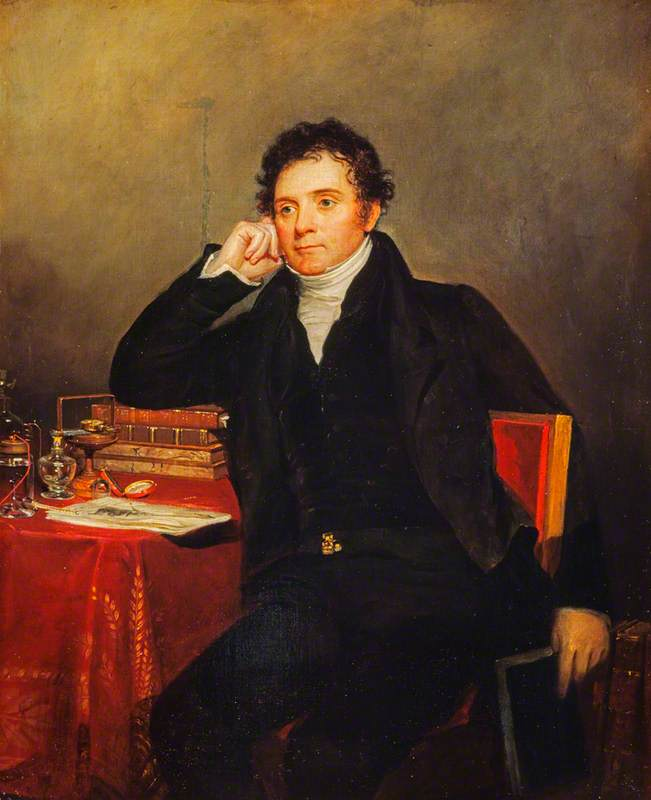
- Thomas Stewart Traill, 1827 portrait
- Born: 29 October 1781; Kirkwall, Orkney, Scotland
- Died: 30 July 1862 (aged 80); Edinburgh, Scotland
- Education: University of Edinburgh (MD 1802)
- Known for: List of animals of Greenland
- Scientific career
- Fields: Physician, chemist, meteorologist, zoologist, professor of medical jurisprudence
- Workplaces: Liverpool Infirmary, University of Edinburgh
- Doctoral advisor: Alexander Monro III
- Author abbrev. (zoology): Traill

Thomas Stewart Traill FRSE PRCPE MWS RSSA (29 October 1781 – 30 July 1862) was a British physician, chemist, meteorologist, zoologist and professor of medical jurisprudence. He was well known through his involvement in the Roscoe circle and the British Association for the Advancement of Science.

== Early life and background ==
Traill was born at Kirkwall in Orkney, the son of the Rev Thomas Traill (died 1782), the minister in Kirkwall, and his wife Lucia, daughter of James Traill of Westray His father died the year after he was born, and he was educated by his uncle the Rev. Robert Yule, married to his father's sister Barbara.

== Medical career ==
Traill studied medicine at the University of Edinburgh under Dr Alexander Monro, gaining his doctorate (MD) in 1802. From 1803 he practised medicine in Liverpool from 1803, where he had letters of introduction from a nephew of James Currie.

Traill joined Liverpool Infirmary in 1829. In 1831 he was one of the local physicians engaged there to combat the 1826–1837 cholera pandemic, In 1832 he returned to Edinburgh as Regius Professor of Medical Jurisprudence and Medical Police, covering the areas of forensic medicine and public health.

== Later life and death ==
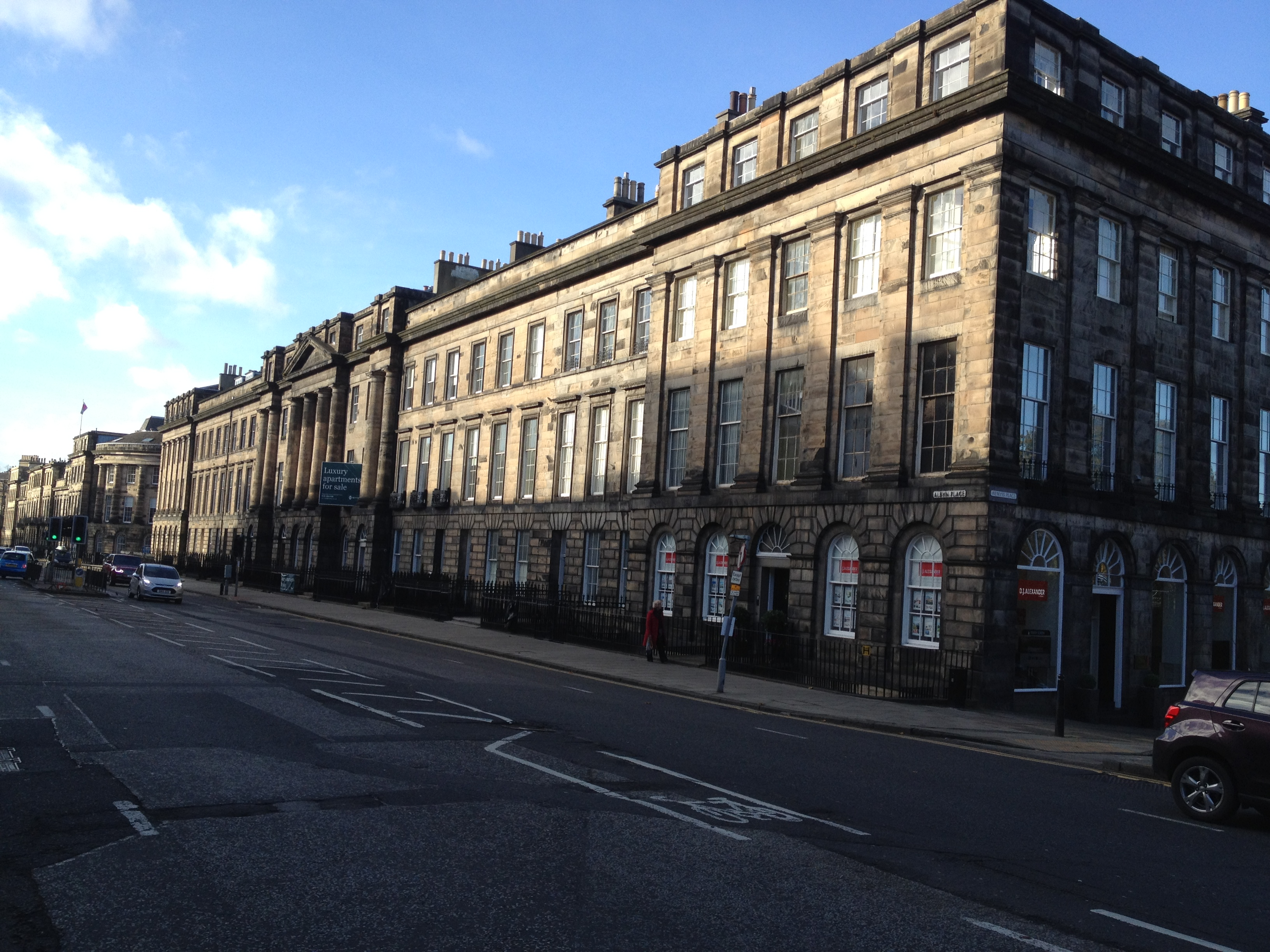
Albyn Place, Edinburgh

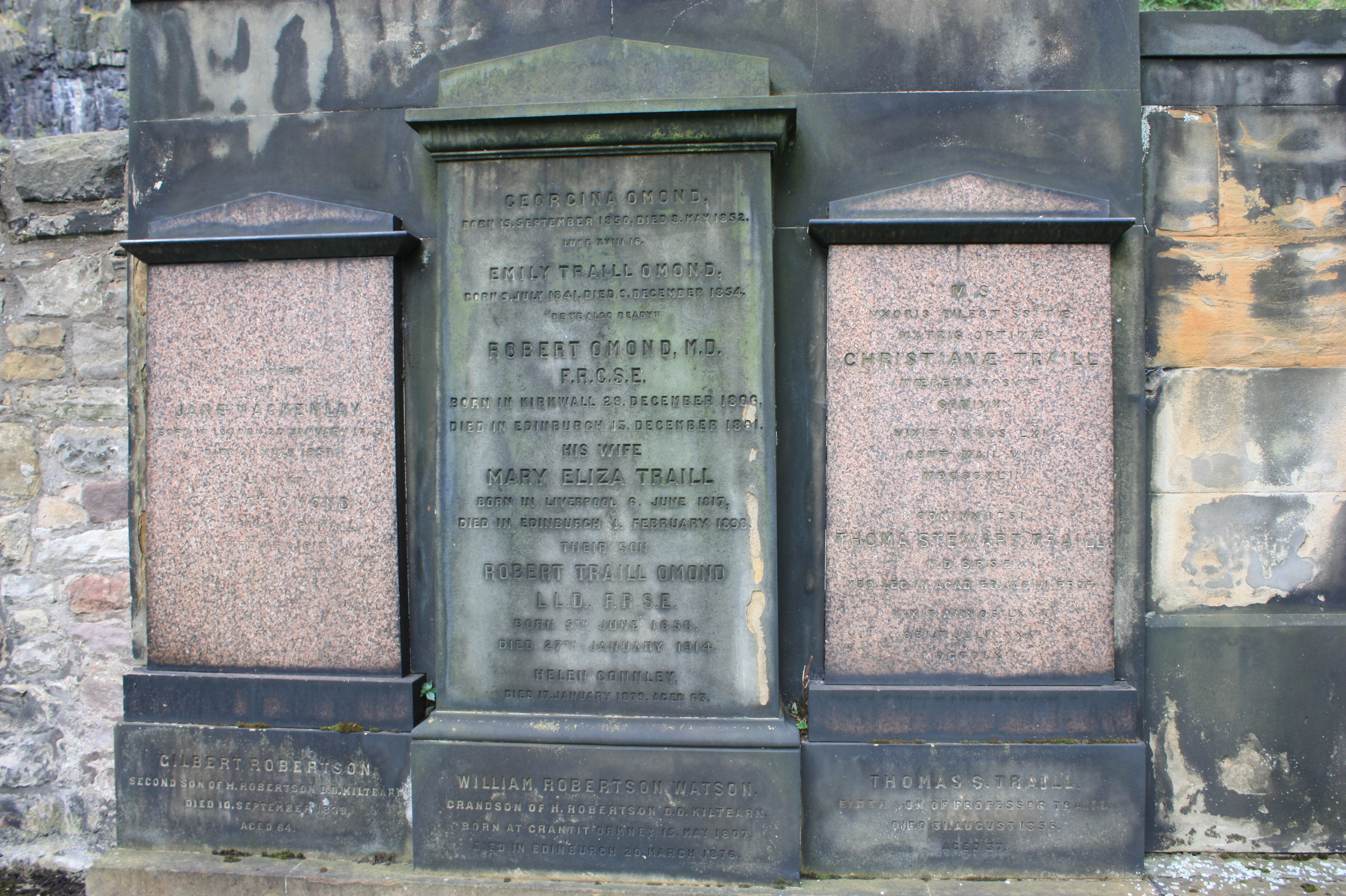
The grave of Thomas Stewart Traill, St Cuthbert's churchyard, Edinburgh

In 1840 Traill was living at 10 Albyn Place in Edinburgh's Moray Estate close to Charlotte Square. He died at his final home, 29 Rutland Square in Edinburgh's West End on 30 July 1862, and was interred at St Cuthbert's cemetery. The grave contains members of both the Omond family and Traill family and stands against an outer eastern wall of the southern section, under the shadows of Edinburgh Castle. He was a keen, if unsuccessful, advocate of women attending the university. His portrait by Alexander Mosses is held by the Scottish National Portrait Gallery.

== Interests ==
=== Roscoe circle ===
Traill encountered William Roscoe at the original Liverpool Botanic Garden of 1803, who found in him an ally. Traill joined the informal Roscoe circle, a group including businessmen as well as doctors. When the failure of the bank Roscoe, Clarke & Roscoe in 1816 led to William Roscoe's bankruptcy in 1820, Traill was in the group of friends who gave him personal financial support.

Traill was a founder of the Literary and Philosophical Society of Liverpool, with Theophilus Houlbrooke, Richard Rathbone, William Rathbone V, William Shepherd and Joseph Brooks Yates, and was its first secretary and third president. He lectured on chemistry at the Liverpool Institution, a learned society founded in 1814 (from 1817 having a royal charter). He was also involved with setting up the Liverpool Mechanics' School of Arts, having the backing of Sir John Gladstone and William Huskisson.

=== Terrestrial magnetism ===
Traill's acquaintance with William Scoresby led to his early but minimal role in the British Magnetic Survey. Scoresby was at Edinburgh University from 1806, was elected to the Wernerian Society of Edinburgh in 1809, and to the Royal Society of Edinburgh in 1819. He was from 1827 to 1832 chaplain at Liverpool's Floating Church for Seamen, moving on to Exeter in 1832. In the wake of James Dunlop's 1830 magnetic survey of Scotland, Scoresby was the prime candidate in 1831 for taking on a survey in England, but his circumstances interfered. The project, with Dunlop's magnetometer and Hansteen needle, was passed to Traill. His move to Edinburgh then intervened, and he managed only a few observations. The survey was started in earnest by Edward Sabine in 1833.

=== Natural history ===
Traill read an 1818 paper Observations on the Anatomy of the Orang Outang to the Wernerian Society, after dissecting a chimpanzee cadaver, belonging to William Bullock. He drew conclusions on animal speech.

In 1822, after the resignation of William Elford Leach as Keeper in the Natural History Department of the British Museum, Traill took a close interest in having William Swainson elected his successor. Swainson's candidacy was unsuccessful; and Traill then began an anonymous campaign against the Museum. It concentrated on the conditions of storage at Montague House for the natural history collections, and the fate of the Sloane Collection. Traill's expressed views gained some traction, which might not have happened in the same way if the source had been known, because his own scientific works were not considered careful. The ultimate separation of the Natural History Museum, London from the British Museum was influenced by the campaign.

Traill contributed a list of animals observed in eastern Greenland to William Scoresby's Journal of a Voyage to the Northern Whale Fishery (1823); Scoresby named Traill Island in Greenland for him. Mount Traill in Nigeria was named after him by William Balfour Baikie.

When John James Audubon arrived in Liverpool in July 1826 Traill helped him to find a publisher for his The Birds of America. Audubon named the Traill's flycatcher after him, which at one time referred to a species which included both the willow flycatcher (Empidonax traillii) and the alder flycatcher (Empidonax alnorum). The maroon oriole was named Oriolus traillii for him by Nicholas Aylward Vigors, in 1832.

== Awards and honours ==
Traill was elected a Fellow of the Royal Society of Edinburgh in 1819. His proposers were Robert Jameson, John Murray, Lord Murray, and Thomas Charles Hope. He was Curator of the Society's museum from 1834 to 1856. In 1833 he was elected a member of the Aesculapian Club; and in 1837 a member of the Harveian Society of Edinburgh, serving as president in 1842.

In 1837 Traill was President of the British Association for the Advancement of Science. He was President of the Royal Scottish Society of the Arts 1843–44. He served as President of the Royal College of Physicians in Edinburgh 1852 to 1854.

== Family ==
In July 1811 Traill married Christian Robertson (1780–1842), daughter of the Rev. Harry Robertson of Kiltearn, Ross-shire and the widow of James Watson of Crantit, Orkney, a factor for Lord Dundas. Her sister Elizabeth married Samuel Sandbach.

Christian had married, firstly, James Watson, at age 19, and had five sons by him. James was age 28 when he died, and the youngest was posthumous. Of those sons, the planter Peter Miller Watson (1805–1869) was father of the footballer Andrew Watson. Elder brothers were Henry Robertson Watson (1801–1836) and Andrew Watson (1803–1837). In the previous generation Christian's brothers Gilbert (1774–1840) and Hugh Monro Robertson were involved in the Kiltearn estate at Berbice, British Guiana. Her uncle George Forbes was a purchaser of the Culloden estate on Tobago.

Christian had a further five children with Traill, two sons and three daughters. Their daughter Mary Eliza Traill (1817–1898) married Robert Omond, and was mother of Robert Traill Omond.

== Works ==
- Thermometer and Pyrometer (1828)
- The Medico-Legal Examination of Dead Bodies (1839), a standard textbook on postmortem examinations, written with Robert Christison and James Syme.
- The Edinburgh Pharmacopoeia (1841, 12th edition)
- Memoir of William Roscoe (1853)

In 1847 Traill replaced Macvey Napier as main editor of the Encyclopædia Britannica for its 8th edition, appearing in 21 volumes to 1861. He contributed a large number of articles, but for health reasons delegated editorial work.

== See also ==
- Category:Taxa named by Thomas Stewart Traill
