= Thomas Bolton =

Thomas or Tom Bolton may refer to:

- Thomas Nelson, 2nd Earl Nelson (1786–1835), born Thomas Bolton
- Thomas Bolton (microscopist) (1831–1887), English businessman, zoologist, and microscopist
- Thomas Bolton (politician) (1841–1906), British politician
- Thomas Henry Bolton (1841–1916), British solicitor and politician
- Thomas Bolton (mayor) (died 1862), mayor of the Borough of Liverpool, England
- Tom Bolton (astronomer) (1943–2021), American-Canadian astronomer
- Tom Bolton (baseball) (born 1962), American professional baseball pitcher
- Tom Bolton, winner of the Distinguished Canadian Retail of the Year Award, 1983
