= The Lyceum, Liverpool =

Listed building in Liverpool, England

The Lyceum
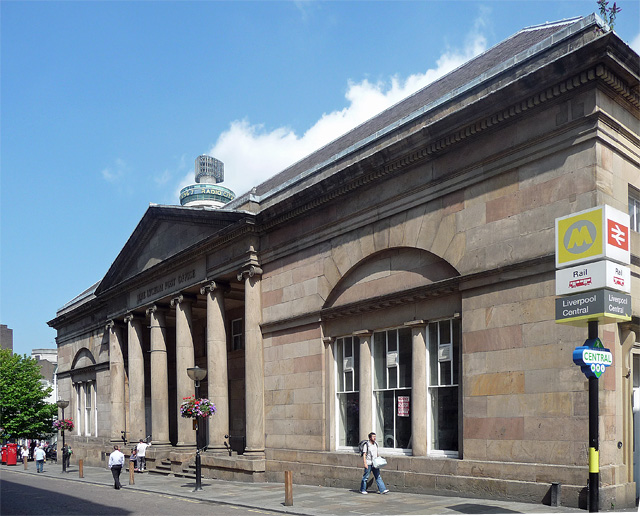
- Former Lyceum, Bold Street, Liverpool
- Interactive map of the The Lyceum area

General information
- Architectural style: Neoclassical
- Location: Bold Street, Liverpool, England
- Coordinates: 53.4044°N 2.9806°W
- Construction started: 1800
- Completed: 1802
- Cost: £11,000 (1803)

Design and construction
- Architect: Thomas Harrison
- Engineer: William Slater
- Designations

Listed Building – Grade II*
- Official name: The Lyceum
- Designated: 28 June 1952
- Reference no.: 1068383

The Lyceum is a Neoclassical Grade II* listed building located on Bold Street, Liverpool, England. It was constructed in 1802 as a news-room and England's first subscription library (1758–1942) and later became a gentlemen's club. After the club relocated in 1952 the building was left unoccupied for many years, eventually falling into a state of disrepair. Calls were made for its demolition in the late 1970s, sparking a campaign to save the building. It reopened as a post office, and then a branch of the Co-operative Bank. As of May 2024, its tenants are a Chinese restaurant (Church Street entrance) and a miniature golf and bar venue called One Below (main entrance).

== Construction ==
In 1757 members of a small literary club met in the house of William Everard, a teacher, to discuss reviews, periodicals and later books, which they circulated amongst themselves. On 1 May 1758, the Liverpool Library was established and the books which were originally stored in a large chest in Everard's parlor were moved to a number of different premises around the city centre as the collection increased.

A proposal was put forward on 12 May 1800 to club members for the construction of a purpose-built library in order to house their overflowing collection which had outgrown its current home on Lord Street.

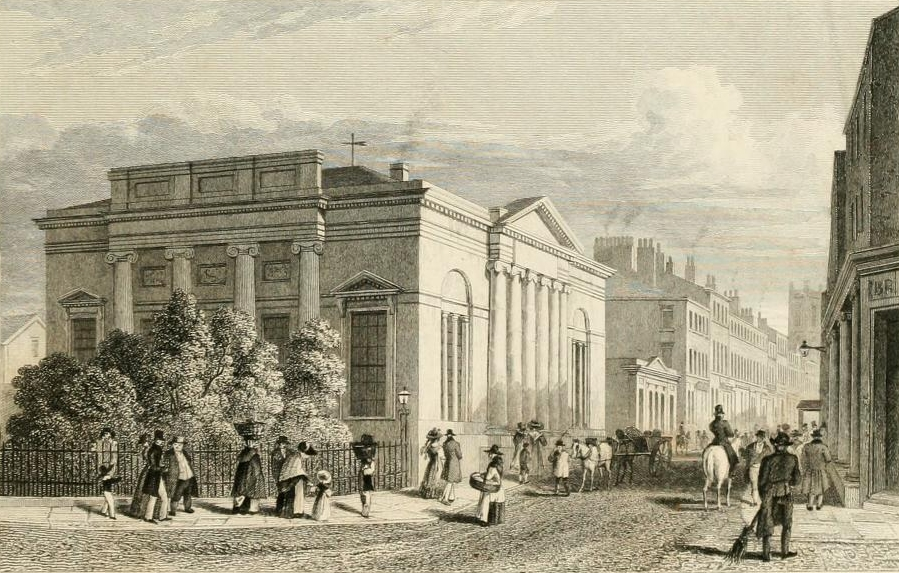
Lyceum Newsroom and Library in 1828

A design was accepted from architect Thomas Harrison of Chester which showed the building facing Church Street; this was later modified to fit local circumstances. Each of the library's 892 subscribers contributed 12 guineas (£12.60) each towards its construction. A 50-year lease on the land was purchased and construction work began in 1800 under the guide of William Slater. Completed two years later at a cost of £11,000 the deed was then signed. Signatories included John Lightbody; John Currie; John Yates, minister of Paradise Street Unitarian Church; and most notably abolitionist William Roscoe.

The Lyceum opened on 17 December 1802 with both the newsroom and library acting as separate institutions offering shares priced at 12 guineas for the newsroom and five guineas for the library. Selling of these shares raised £2,089 10s. The newsroom contained a coffee room and reading room were members had access to provincial, London and Irish newspapers, magazines, reviews and maps. Members were charged 10s 6d annually while proprietors paid one guinea and could admit a stranger for two months. The library was housed in a circular room which was estimated in 1807 to contain upwards of 10,000 volumes. Other rooms in the building were used for giving lectures and as meeting rooms for committee members. Over time the newsroom expanded, eventually taking over most of the building to become known as the Lyceum Gentlemen's Club.

== Decline ==
The library part of the building closed in 1942 and its collection of books was given to Liverpool Public Library. Ten years later, after a century and a half in the building, the club moved into new premises in the city centre while the Lyceum became Grade II* listed on 28 June 1952. The building was sold to developers, who in 1971 submitted an application to Liverpool City Council to demolish it, to make way for a shopping development and an extension to Liverpool Central Train Station. A petition called 'Save the Lyceum' and the involvement of SAVE Britain's Heritage forced the government's Department of the Environment to purchase the building.

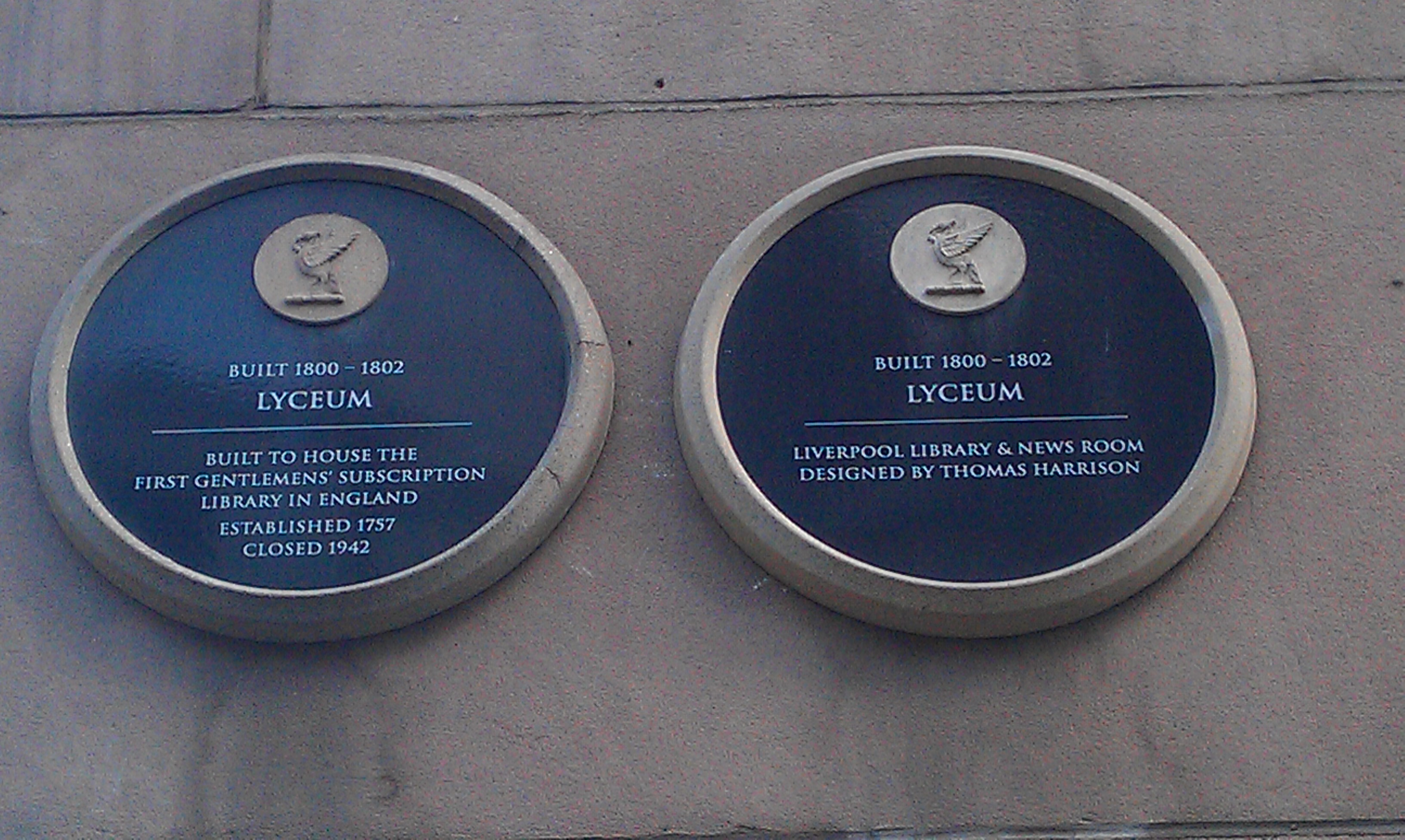
The Lyceum plaques

In 1984 the Lyceum was bought by the Post Office for £320,000 with a view of turning it into the city's PO headquarters and a philatelic museum. However, a major national restructuring, resulting in a private company called Post Office Counters Ltd meant the plans could no longer go ahead due to limited resources. Post Office Counters Ltd sold the Lyceum back to the developers, who again requested consent for its demolition. With opposition from Liverpool City Council and English Heritage, a compromise with developers resulted in part of the restored building being leased back to the Post Office and other parts converted to retail outlets. The lower floor became a building society while the ground floor along with the post office became a changing succession of different bars/cafes under various names including 'Life Bar', 'Prohibition', 'The Bar and Grill' and the 'Lyceum Café'.

It was announced in March 2004 that the post office branch was to close following a downsizing of Post Offices. After its closure other outlets soon followed, leading to the whole building being left empty except for a branch of the Co-operative Bank on the lower floor. Two years later, property developer Landlord Harbour View Estates bought the building for £7.8 million, only to put it up for sale again in 2008 for £4.25 million after the company went into administration. In 2010 John Doyle, a director of a property investment company, negotiated acquisition of the freehold, purchasing it from Anglo Irish Bank for £2.85 million, a significant discount to its previous sale price of £7.3 million. In April 2017, the Co-operative Bank finally left, leaving the building entirely vacant. The building is now re-let as a city centre Chinese restaurant.

== Architecture ==
=== Exterior ===
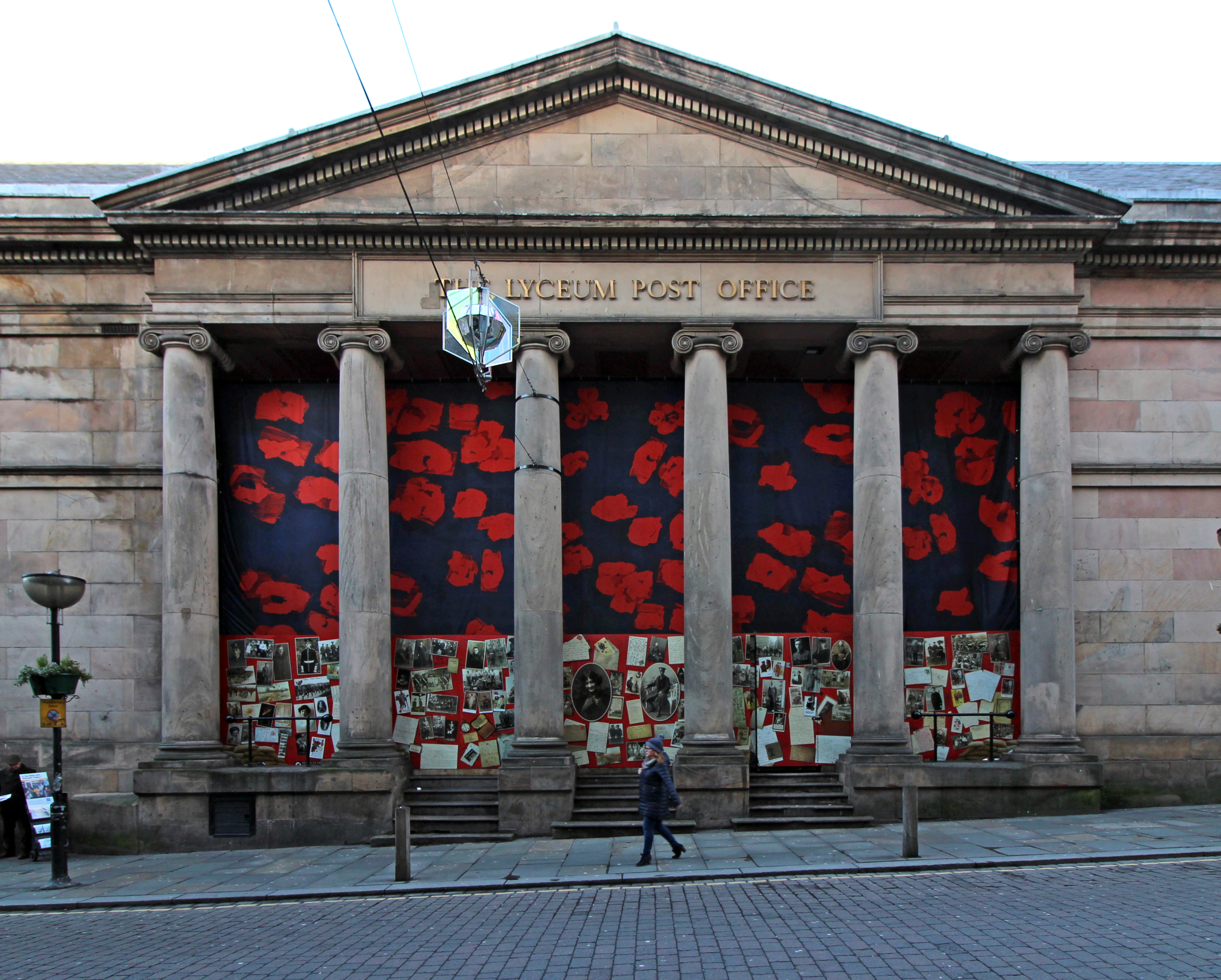
The main entrance, hosting a war memorial display

Harrison's original plan was for the building to face Church Street with a flight of steps leading up to the entrance but this plan was altered to meet 'local circumstances'. The exterior is neoclassical in style and built with ashlar stone topped with a slate pitched roof that is part mansard. Its plan consists of a rectangle with a recessed portico held up by six ionic columns which face Bold Street. The building's main entrance consists of four six-panel doors with architraves, cornices and consoles frames. On each side of the portico are three slightly recessed windows divided by Doric columns.

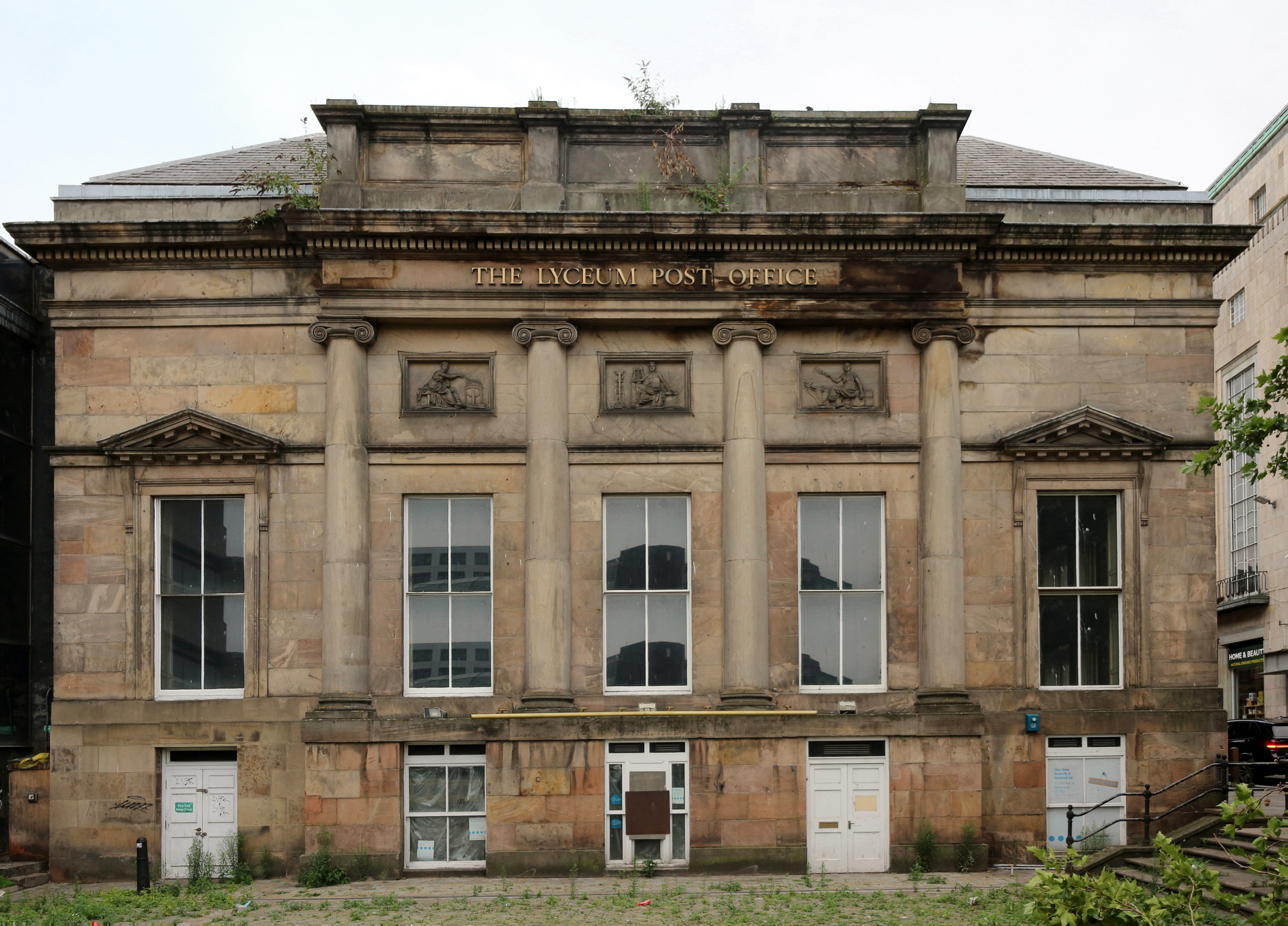
Elevation facing Church Street

On the left side facing Church Street are five evenly spaced half length windows with the first and fifth having pediments. The centre three windows are divided by four ionic columns and topped with alto relievo images of Greek characters by F.A. Legé. The left relief is a seated geographer with a divider measuring distances on a globe; this is speculated to be Eratosthenes. In the middle is Apollo the god of art, music and poetry and on the right is Hermes, the god of commerce and communication. The lower third of the building has full length windows and two doors. Historically this part of the building had a semi-circular area with trees; this has since been flagged over and railings added. The overall exterior was restored in the 1980s removing soot which had built up on the stone.

=== Interior ===
The former newsroom which faces Church Street has a segmental-vaulted ceiling and an arched recess with friezes facing the windows. The friezes are painted in grisaille to imitate classical relief sculpture and are said to be adapted from the Parthenon and the Temple of Apollo Epicurius at Bassae. Harrison's original ceiling was thought to be lost after a floor was added above in the early 1900s, but was later restored by Edmund Percey Scherrer & Hicks in 1990 when design plans were found in the Liverpool Planning Department. Opposite the newsroom stands the former library, a circular room topped with a dome measuring 59 feet (18 m) in diameter. During its use it was furnished with a gallery running around it, featuring vases, books and busts of historic figures including: Shakespeare, Milton, Locke, Bacon, Homer and Virgil. By 1841 the library had upwards of 30,000 volumes. Entered from the North West, the lower floor has Edwardian style plasterwork and woodwork.

== See also ==
- Architecture of Liverpool
- Grade II* listed buildings in Liverpool – City Centre
- List of libraries in Liverpool
- List of works by Thomas Harrison
- Liverpool Central Library
