= Joseph Brooks Yates =

English merchant and antiquarian (1780–1855)

Joseph Brooks Yates FSA
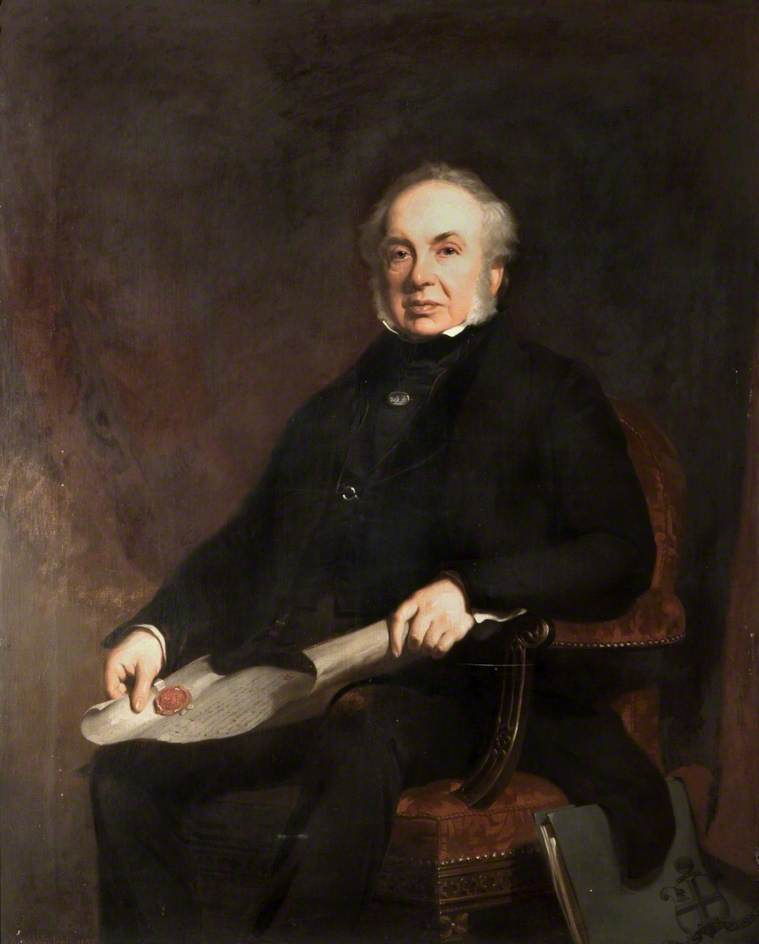
- Joseph Brooks Yates
- Born: 21 January 1780; Liverpool, Lancashire, England
- Died: 12 December 1855 (aged 75); Liverpool, Lancashire, England
- Education: Eton College
- Occupations: Merchant; Antiquary
- Spouse: Margaret Taylor
- Children: 1
- Relatives: John Yates (father); John Ashton Yates (brother); James Yates (brother); Pemberton Heywood Yates (brother)

Joseph Brooks Yates FSA (1780–1855) was an English antiquary, merchant and slave trader.

== Background and education ==
Born in Liverpool on 21 January 1780, he was the eldest son of John Yates, minister of the Paradise Street Unitarian Chapel, Liverpool. His brothers were John Ashton Yates (1781–1863), M.P. for Carlow and author of pamphlets on trade and slavery; Richard Vaughan Yates (1785–1856), founder of Prince's Park, Liverpool; James Yates; and Pemberton Heywood Yates (1791–1822). He was educated by William Shepherd and at Eton College.

== West Indies, Jamaica and slavery interests ==
On leaving Eton, around 1796, Yates entered the house of a West India merchant, in which he became a partner; he continued in it until a year or two before he died. He had numerous holdings in slave-run estates in Jamaica.

== Philanthropic and antiquarian interests ==
Yates was one of the leading reformers of Liverpool, and a supporter of its literary and scientific institutions. In February 1812 he joined with Thomas Stewart Traill in founding the Liverpool Literary and Philosophical Society, of which he was president during four triennial periods, and a frequent reader of papers at its meetings. He was also one of the founders of the Southern and Toxteth Hospital in Liverpool. In 1854 he acted as local vice-president of the British Association at the Liverpool meeting.

Yates was elected Fellow of the Society of Antiquaries of London on 18 April 1852, and was also Fellow of the Royal Geographical Society. He was a Member of Council of the Chetham Society from 1852 to 1855, and an original Member of the Philological Society. He collected pictures and a library containing some fine manuscripts and emblem books, and was an occasional contributor to literary and other journals.

Yates died in Dingle, Liverpool, on 12 December 1855, and was buried in the graveyard of the old Unitarian chapel, Toxteth Park.

== Published works ==
Yates's writings include:

- On Richard Rolle of Hampole's Stimulus Conscientiæ, 1820 (in Archæologia, xix. 314–35). And on the same author's manuscript version of the Psalter.
- Geographical Knowledge and Construction of Maps in the Dark Ages, 1838.
- Memoir on the Rapid and Extensive Changes which have taken place at the Entrance to the River Mersey, 1840; he brought the same subject before the British Association in 1854, when a committee was appointed to investigate the matter. An elaborate report was printed in the British Association Report, 1856.
- Miracle Plays (in Christian Teacher), 1841.
- Bishop Hall's Mundus Alter et Idem, 1844.
- Archæological Notices respecting Paper, 1848.
- On Books of Emblems, 1848.
- On Ancient Manuscripts and the Method of preparing them, 1851.
- An Account of Two Greek Sepulchral Inscriptions at Ince Blundell, 1852.
- The Rights and Jurisdiction of the County Palatine of Chester, in the Chetham Society's Miscellanies, 1857.
- Invested in the Transatlantic slave trade. Owner of “The Brooks” slave ship.

== Family ==
Yates married, on 22 July 1813, Margaret, daughter of Thomas Taylor of Blackley, near Manchester. His eldest daughter married S. H. Thompson, banker, Liverpool; and two of her sons were Henry Yates Thompson and the Rev. Samuel Ashton Thompson Yates. His daughter Anna Maria (d.1850) married Robert Needham Philips; they were grandparents of G.M. Trevelyan & Sir Charles Trevelyan, 3rd Baronet through their daughter Caroline, who married George Otto Trevelyan.

== Sources ==
- This article incorporates text from a publication now in the public domain: "Yates, Joseph Brooks". Dictionary of National Biography. London: Smith, Elder & Co. 1885–1900.
