= Bowood circle =

The Bowood circle was a loose, international group of intellectual figures and writers of the later 18th century drawn together around Lord Shelburne, Prime Minister of Great Britain in the 1780s, and named after his residence Bowood House. They had in common an interest in political reform. They met informally at Bowood House, or in London, and have been compared to a think tank.

Proposals from the circle were aired in the Repository, edited by Benjamin Vaughan, during 1788.

== Terminology ==
Shelburne's patronage was broadly based, and not limited to this intellectual set, also called the Bowood Group. The "Shelburne circle" may have a broader reference than the inner Bowood circle. "Shelburne group" may refer to a faction of Whig Members of Parliament. Lansdowne circle, referencing Shelburne's step up in the peerage from Earl of Shelburne to Marquess of Lansdowne, may be used as a synonym of "Bowood circle".

A later "Bowood circle" was that around the 3rd Marquess of Lansdowne and Nassau Senior.

== Membership ==
Those associated with the circle included:

- Jeremy Bentham
- Étienne Clavière
- François d'Ivernois
- Étienne Dumont
- John Dunning
- Thomas Jervis
- Jacques-Antoine Duroveray
- Richard Price
- Joseph Priestley
- Samuel Romilly
- Charles Stanhope, Lord Mahon
- Benjamin Vaughan

The group had some members in common with the Lunar Society and the Liverpool Roscoe circle.
