= Traill's flycatcher =

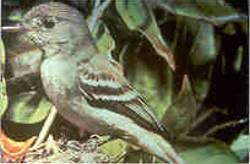
Southwestern willow flycatcher

Traill's flycatcher (Empidonax traillii) was a supposed species of tyrant flycatcher in the genus Empidonax. It was named by John James Audubon after his close British friend Thomas Stewart Traill.

After 1973 it was considered to be two distinct but closely related species, which are outwardly very similar but prefer differing ranges and habitats, have different songs, and replace each other geographically without significant hybridization:

- Alder flycatcher, Empidonax alnorum
- Willow flycatcher, Empidonax traillii (proper)

== Taxonomy ==
The original binomial given to the species by Audubon was Muscicapa traillii, the Muscicapia genus referring to Old World flycatchers and the traillii referring to his friend Thomas Stewart Traill.

== History ==
The species was described by Audubon in 1828, based on a specimen that had been collected in Arkansas. Based on the reported song and location it is likely that this specimen was an Alder flycatcher.

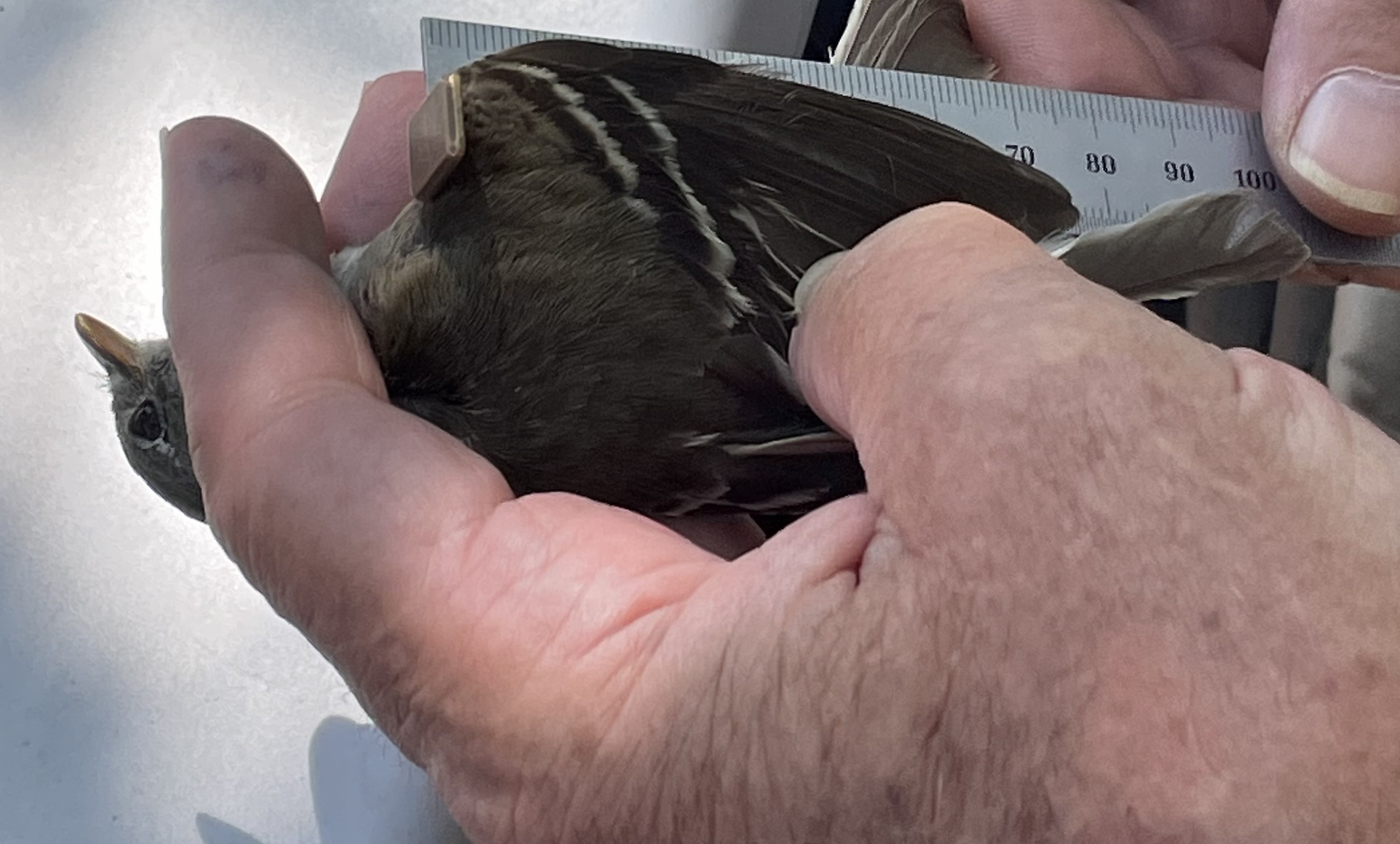
Traill's flycatcher (likely alder)

Several specimens were procured by John Kirk Townsend around the Columbia river, a few of which were given to John James Audubon. Audubon gifted one of these specimens to the Prince of Musignano, and one to the Earl of Derby.

It is featured as Plate 45 on Audubon's Birds of America 1827-1838 series.

=== Species split ===
The idea that the Traill's flycatcher may be two distinct populations was proposed in a paper published in 1963, by the ornithologist Robert C. Stein. In this paper Stein compared attributes such as the nest structures, morphology, and behaviour of the Traill's flycatcher populations based on if they sang the fee-bee-o or fitz-bew song pattern. He came to the conclusion that they were in fact two distinct species, and that their songs were an isolating mechanism.

In 1973, the American Ornithological Society officially declared the Traill's flycatcher as being two separate species.
