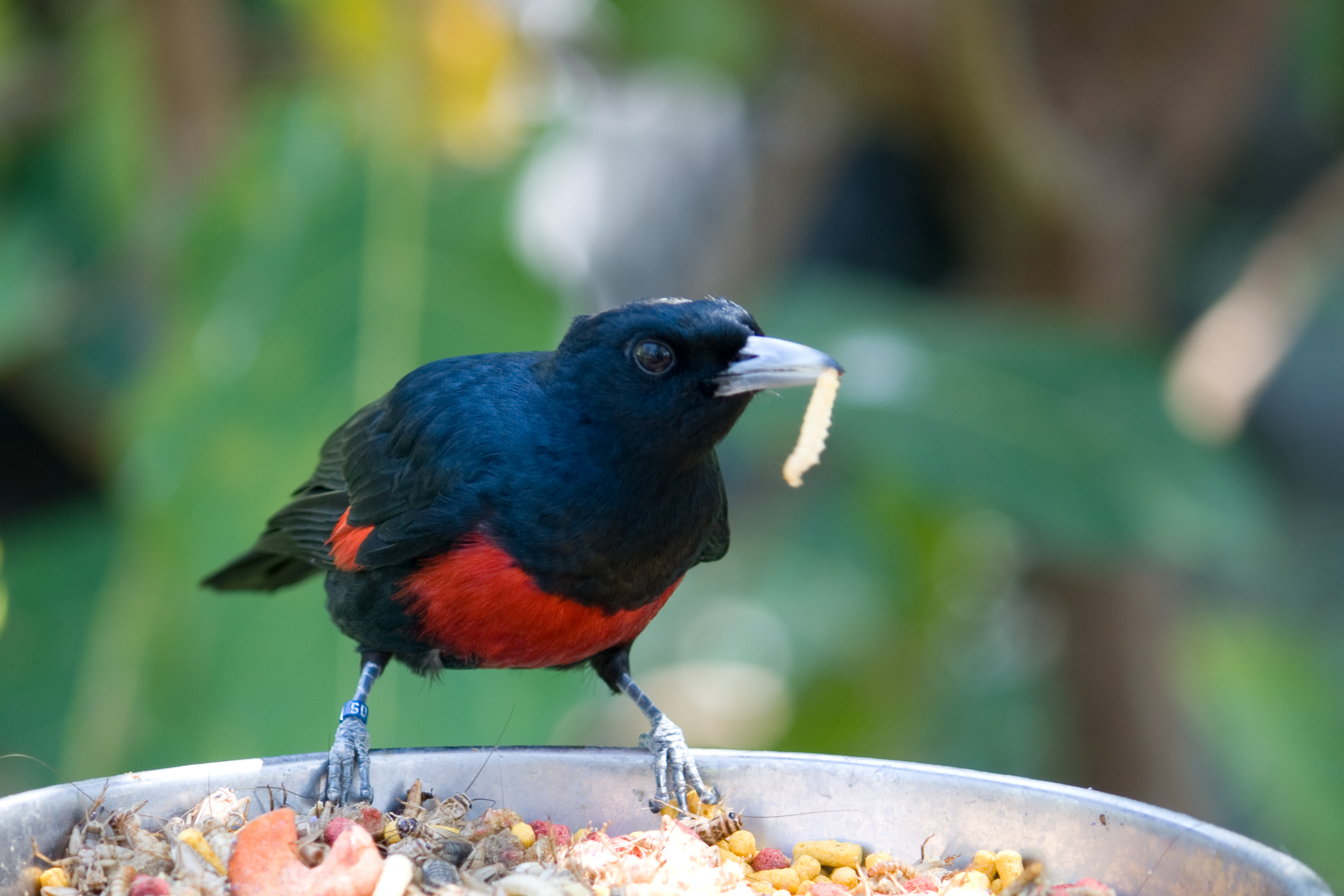

Conservation status
- Least Concern (IUCN 3.1)

Scientific classification
- Kingdom: Animalia
- Phylum: Chordata
- Class: Aves
- Order: Passeriformes
- Family: Oriolidae
- Genus: Oriolus
- Species: O. consanguineus

Binomial name
- Oriolus consanguineus (Wardlaw-Ramsay, 1881)

= Black-and-crimson oriole =

Species of bird

The black-and-crimson oriole (Oriolus consanguineus) is a species of bird in the family Oriolidae.

It is found in Indonesia and Malaysia where its natural habitats are subtropical or tropical moist lowland forest and subtropical or tropical moist montane forest.

== Taxonomy and systematics ==
The black-and-crimson oriole was originally described in the genus Leptopteryx (a synonym for Artamella). Along with the black, maroon and silver orioles, it belongs to a clade of red and black orioles. Alternate names for the black-and-crimson oriole include the black-crimson oriole and crimson-breasted oriole.

=== Subspecies ===
Three subspecies are recognized:

- O. c. malayanus - Robinson & Kloss, 1923: Found on the Malay Peninsula
- O. c. consanguineus - (Ramsay, RGW, 1881): Originally described as a separate species. Found on Sumatra
- O. c. vulneratus - Sharpe, 1887: Originally described as a separate species. Found on northern Borneo
