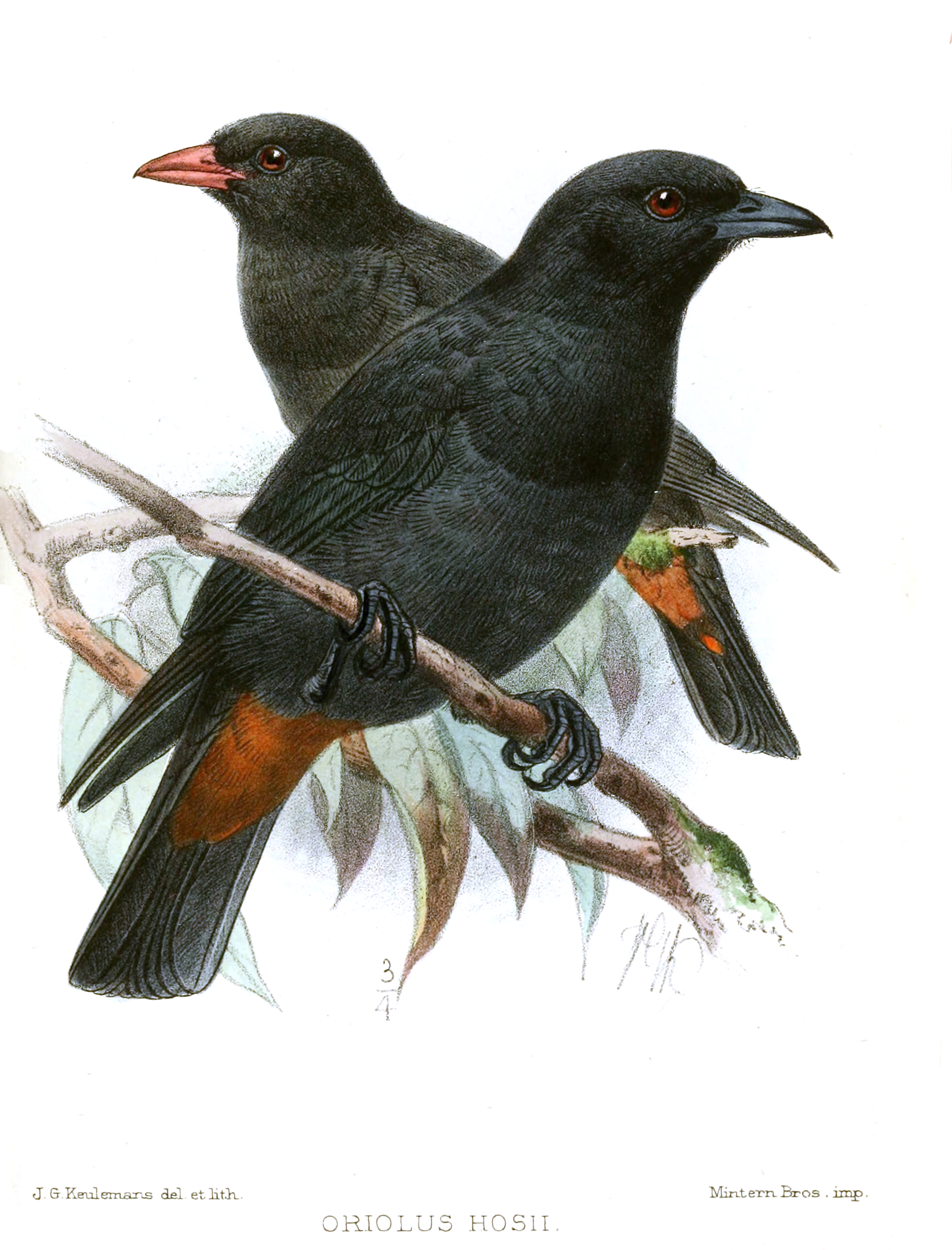

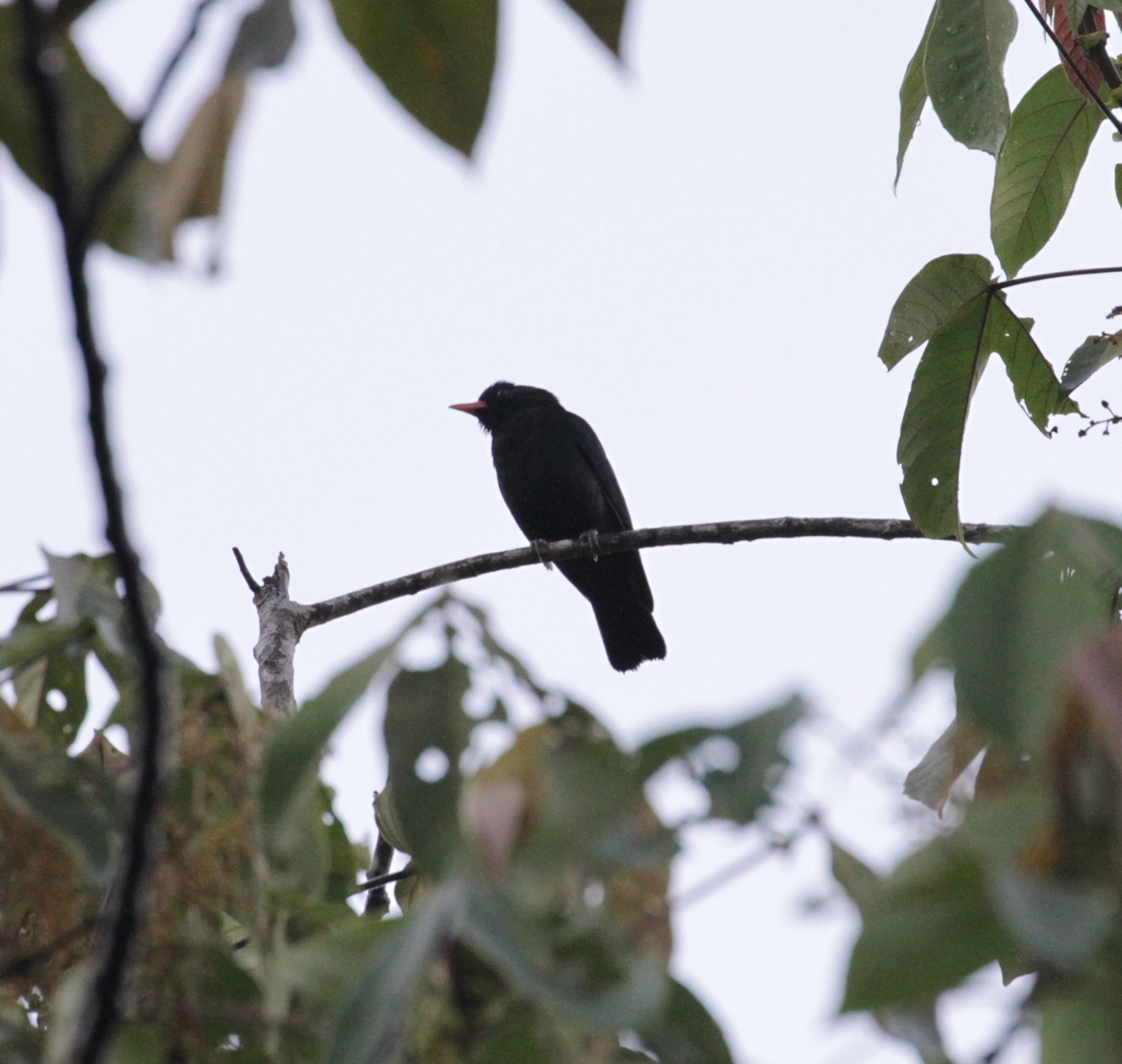

Conservation status
- Near Threatened (IUCN 3.1)

Scientific classification
- Kingdom: Animalia
- Phylum: Chordata
- Class: Aves
- Order: Passeriformes
- Family: Oriolidae
- Genus: Oriolus
- Species: O. hosii

Binomial name
- Oriolus hosii Sharpe, 1892

= Black oriole =

Species of bird

The black oriole (Oriolus hosii) is a species of bird in the family Oriolidae. It is endemic to the island of Borneo. One of the least known of the orioles, its distribution range is restricted to Sarawak in Borneo. Along with the black-and-crimson, maroon, and silver orioles, it belongs to a clade of red and black orioles. The binomial name is after Charles Hose who collected the first specimen of the species on Mount Dulit.

Its natural habitat is subtropical or tropical moist montane forests where it is threatened by habitat loss.
