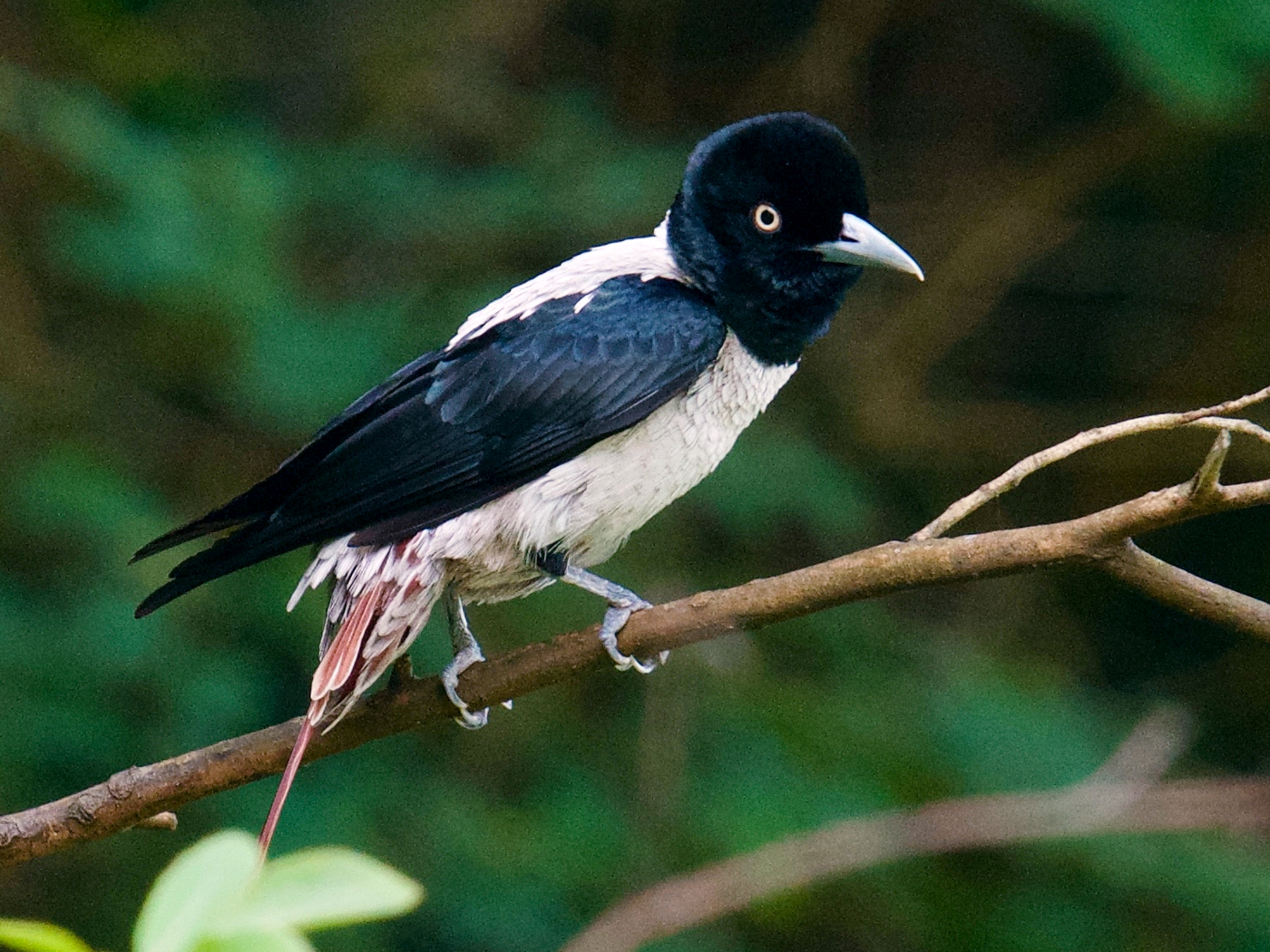

Conservation status
- Endangered (IUCN 3.1)

Scientific classification
- Kingdom: Animalia
- Phylum: Chordata
- Class: Aves
- Order: Passeriformes
- Family: Oriolidae
- Genus: Oriolus
- Species: O. mellianus

Binomial name
- Oriolus mellianus Stresemann, 1922

Synonyms
- Oriolus traillii mellianus

= Silver oriole =

Species of bird

The silver oriole (Oriolus mellianus) is a species of bird in the family Oriolidae. It breeds in southern China and winters in mainland southeast Asia in southeastern Thailand and southwestern Cambodia. It is 28 cm long; males have a black head and wings, and a silvery-white body; females are duller, with the body mid-grey above, and heavily streaked blackish-grey on white below. Both sexes have a pinkish-grey tail and under-tail coverts, dark grey legs and bill, and a white iris.

Its natural habitats are subtropical or tropical moist lowland forest and subtropical or tropical moist montane forest where it is threatened by habitat loss.

== Taxonomy and systematics ==
The silver oriole was originally described by Stresemann as a subspecies of the maroon oriole, but is now treated as a separate species; it is very similar, except that the red in the body plumage of the maroon oriole is replaced by silvery white. Genetic evidence has now shown that Stresemann's original assessment was accurate, with silver oriole genetically embedded among the subspecies of maroon oriole; the nominate subspecies of maroon oriole is more closely related to silver oriole, than it is to any of the other maroon oriole subspecies.

Along with the black, black-and-crimson and maroon orioles, silver oriole belongs to a clade of red and black orioles.

Other names for the silver oriole include Mell's maroon oriole, Mell's oriole, Stresemann's maroon oriole and Stresemann's oriole.
