= William Shepherd (minister) =

English dissenting minister and politician (1768–1847)

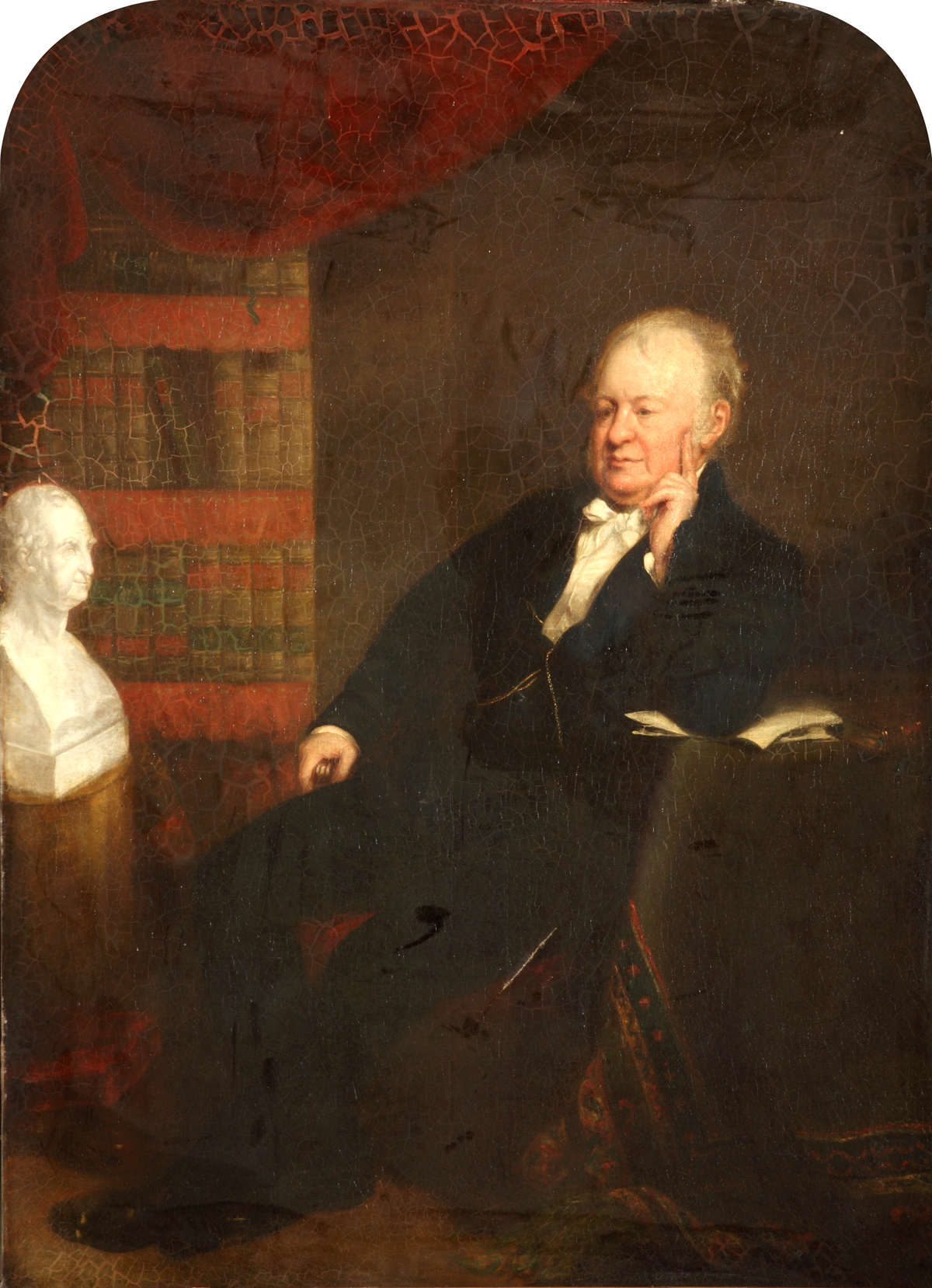
William Shepherd by Thomas Henry Illidge.

William Shepherd (11 October 1768 – 21 July 1847) was an English dissenting minister and politician, known also as a poet and writer.

== Life ==
He was born in Liverpool on 11 October 1768. His father, a tradesman, took an active part in local politics, and was a freeman; he died in 1772. His mother, Elizabeth (died 1787), was daughter of Benjamin Mather, dissenting minister at Over Darwen. Under the supervision of his uncle, Tatlock Mather (died 1785), minister of a presbyterian (Unitarian) congregation at Rainford, near Prescot, William was successively educated: at Holden's academy near Rainford from 1776 to 1782; by Philip Holland from 1782 to 1785; at Daventry Academy from 1785 to 1788 under Thomas Belsham; and at New College, Hackney, from 1788 to 1790 under Belsham, Andrew Kippis, and Richard Price. On the completion of his academic course in 1790 he became tutor to the sons of the Rev. John Yates, including the future Unitarian minister James Yates, the merchant and member of parliament John Ashton Yates, and the antiquarian Joseph Brooks Yates.

While a tutor Shepherd met William Roscoe, a significant influence; and became one of the group of reformers around Roscoe, known by Tory opponents as "Liverpool Jacobins", that included also James Currie, William Rathbone, and William Smyth, as well as his employer John Yates. the Roscoe Circle also brought William Hazlitt as an acquaintance (who painted his portrait). In 1791 Shepherd became minister of the presbyterian (Unitarian) chapel at Gateacre, near Liverpool. There he opened a school, which he carried on with success; its pupils included three future members of parliament (Benjamin Gaskell, Daniel Gaskell, and John Ashton Yates).

Shepherd was an enthusiast for civil and religious liberty; he was an abolitionist, and by 1790 an advocate of female suffrage. In May 1794, he went to London to visit his friend and college companion at Hackney, Jeremiah Joyce, who had been committed to the Tower of London on a charge of treason. After Joyce's death, in 1816, Shepherd adopted his youngest daughter, Hannah. When Gilbert Wakefield was sentenced in 1799 to two years' imprisonment, Shepherd took charge of his son and eldest daughter, besides visiting Wakefield in Dorchester gaol.

On 27 May 1796 Shepherd was enrolled a burgess of Liverpool, and took part in municipal affairs in the liberal interest. He was an eloquent speaker, and several of his speeches were printed. His political nickname was "Sincerity" Shepherd.

He died at "The Nook", Gateacre, 21 July 1847, and was buried in the yard of the chapel. A marble tablet in the chapel, with inscription by Henry Brougham, was erected in 1850, surmounted by a bust in marble, the work of Isaac Jackson of Liverpool. His library was sold in Liverpool in December 1848.

== Portraits ==
There are numerous portraits of Shepherd. One by Thomas Henry Illidge now hangs in the Walker Art Gallery in Liverpool. There were other portraits by Cornelius Henderson (at Brougham Hall, 1844) and by Moses Haughton the younger (watercolour), in the possession of the Rev. George Eyre Evans of Whitchurch. A fourth has been twice engraved, by Robert William Sievier, and by Thomson for the notice of Shepherd in the Imperial Magazine for April 1821. A miniature on ivory of Shepherd as a young man was at Manchester College, Oxford. A bust portrait, life-size, by a local artist, had a large sale.

== Works ==
His interest in Italian literature, aroused by his friendship with William Roscoe, led to his publication in 1802 of a Life of Poggio Bracciolini, London, (2nd ed. 8vo, Liverpool, 1837), and he edited for private circulation, from the manuscript in the Royal Library at Paris, P. Bracciolini … Dialogus an seni sit uxor ducenda, (Liverpool, 1807). The Life was translated into French, German, and Italian, and on 10 July 1834 the senate of the University of Edinburgh conferred on him the degree of LL.D.

Shepherd's other major publications were:

- Every Man his own Parson, Liverpool, 1791.
- The Diverting History of John Bull and Brother Jonathan, in Liverpool Mercury, 1813.
- Paris in 1802 and 1814, London, 1814; 2nd ed. 1814.
- Systematic Education, written with Jeremiah Joyce and Lant Carpenter, London, 1815; 2nd ed. 1817; 3rd ed. (with plates) 2 vols. 1823.
- The Fatal Effects of Religious Intolerance, Liverpool, 1816.
- Poems original and translated, London, 1829.

He wrote a memoir of Edward Rushton, for Rushton's Poems (1824).

== Family ==
Shepherd married in 1792 Frances, daughter of Robert Nicholson, merchant of Liverpool, and they moved into the old parsonage, "The Nook", Gateacre. They shared in running the boarding school. On 17 November 1829 his wife died, and the management of his household passed to his adopted child, Hannah, the youngest daughter of his old friend Jeremiah Joyce.
