= Renshaw Street Unitarian Chapel =

Former chapel in Liverpool

Coordinates: 53.40419°N 2.9765°W

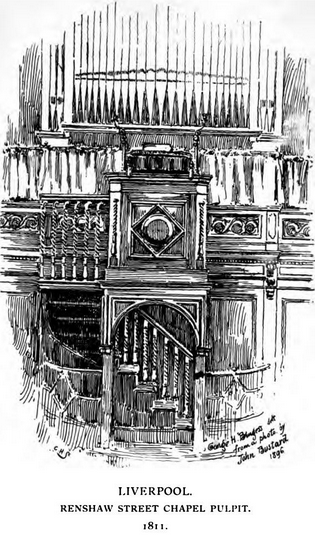
Pulpit at Renshaw Street Unitarian Chapel, Liverpool, constructed in 1811.

Renshaw Street Unitarian Chapel was a Unitarian place of worship in Mount Pleasant, Liverpool, England. It operated from 1811 until the 1890s and was particularly well frequented by ship-owning and mercantile families, who formed a close network of familial and business alliances.

== Origins ==
Renshaw Street Unitarian Chapel had its origins in a Presbyterian community at Toxteth Park that was at one time ministered by Richard Mather. That began around 1687 at Castle Hey and moved to Benn's Gardens in 1727. The Benn's Gardens premises became a place of worship for Welsh Wesleyan Methodists when the new Unitarian chapel was built at Renshaw Street in 1811.

== Architecture ==
One of its later ministers wrote, many decades after the congregation had left the building:

Architecturally the Chapel may be described as Puritanism turned into stone, a fortress built foursquare against the assaults of Satan, an Ironside amongst chapels, with no beauty that men should desire it, save that of fitness for its purpose. This was defined by the Open Trust Deed as the worship of God, whose Divine Nature, as indicated by the architecture, was clearly that of Ein feste burg [a mighty fortress].

The German words might be a reference to the Bach cantata of that name, and "Ironside" was a nickname for an armoured car in use at the time of writing.

== Congregation ==
The new chapel had a congregation that included numerous significant local business families, such as the Booths, Brunners, Gairs, Gaskells, Hollands, Jevons, Jones, Holts, Lamports, Mellys, Rathbones, Tates and Thornelys. It has been described as "the meeting house for a tightly-knit network of Unitarian ship owners and merchants who frequently formed alliances by marriage, met socially, invested in one another's ventures, shared or exchanged practical skills, embarked on philanthropic (especially educational) schemes, and engaged fully in the politics of reform".

The incumbent Reverend John H. Thom was married to a Rathbone. Thom described Emma Holt from another wealthy Liverpool family as an "almoner" to old people requiring assistance, in the year that he died.

Historian Susan Pedersen notes that "politically as progressive as such families might be, they were intensely socially exclusive".

== The move to Ullet Road ==
Land for a new chapel was purchased in 1895 and congregation moved to the new Ullet Road Unitarian Church, near Sefton Park, in 1899, mirroring a general move of the mercantile classes away from the city centre and towards its more salubrious peripheries. Many members built houses in the area.

The Renshaw Street site is now occupied by Grand Central Hall. The chapel graveyard remains as a garden and a monument commemorates the previous use. The cemetery had been closed to new burials under the provisions of sanitary regulations but Thomas Thornely, who died in 1862, was successful in his appeal to the prime minister, Lord Palmerston, to permit, under strict conditions, the burial of people closely related to those already interred. Palmerston himself had been potentially excluded from interment in a family vault elsewhere under the same regulations.

== Notable ministers ==
- Charles Beard
- William Henry Channing
- George Harris
- William Hincks
- L. P. Jacks
- John Hamilton Thom

== Notable congregants ==
- Henry Arthur Bright
- Sir John Brunner, 1st Baronet
- John Pemberton Heywood
- Samuel Holland
- Alfred Holt
- Emma Holt
- George Holt
- William Stanley Jevons
- William Lidderdale
- William Rathbone V
- William Rathbone VI
- William Roscoe
- Henry Tate
- Thomas Thornely
- John Ashton Yates

== See also ==
- Octagon Chapel, Liverpool
- Toxteth Unitarian Chapel
- Ullet Road Unitarian Church
- Hope Street Unitarian Chapel
