= Thomas Bolton (mayor) =

English politician

Thomas Bolton (died 30 March 1862) was mayor of the Borough of Liverpool, England, for the year 1840–41 and from 1814 was a prominent merchant and financier in the firm of Bolton Ogden & Co., which brought together in partnership Bolton's trade in raw cotton based in Liverpool, Lancashire, and that of Jonathan Ogden, whose family's cloth-manufacturing business was based in Leeds, Yorkshire, but was himself based mostly in New York. The firm, which also had dealings with Baltic companies, engaged in trade both in cotton and flour.

Bolton was apprenticed to the firm of William Rathbone around the same time as were the future Members of Parliament John Ashton Yates and Thomas Thornely, and the three remained friends thereafter. He died on 30 March 1862.
