= Edward Rushton =

English poet, writer and bookseller (1756–1814)

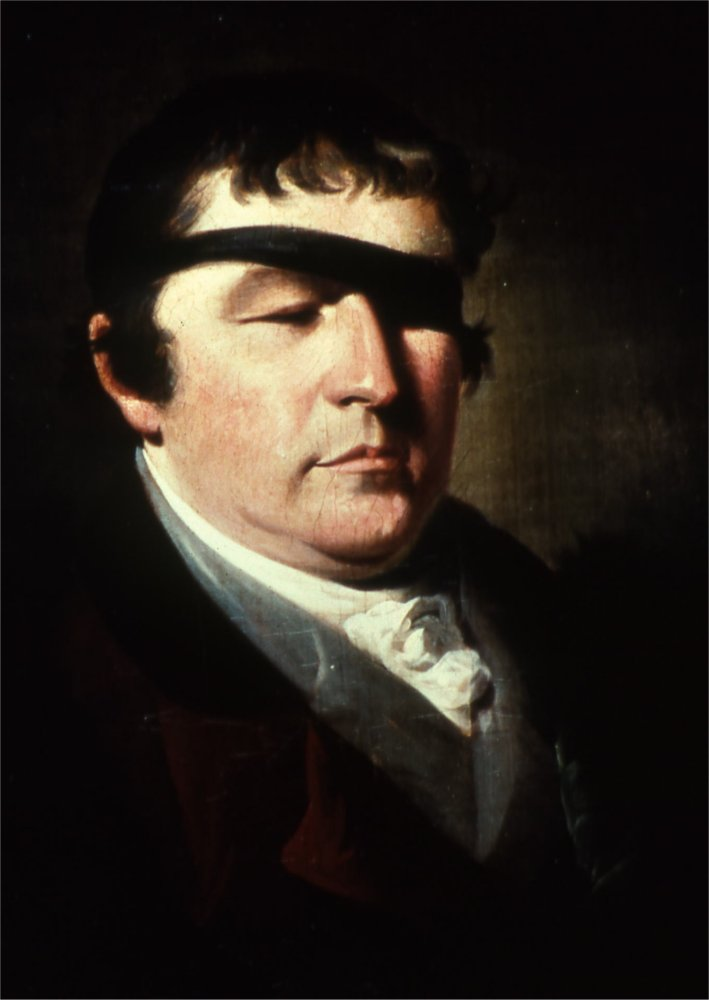
Portrait of Rushton

Edward Rushton (13 November 1756 – 22 November 1814) was an English poet, writer and bookseller from Liverpool. He worked as a sailor onboard several slave ships as a young man, and became an abolitionist as a result. After losing his own vision, Rushton opened a school for the blind, the oldest such school in continuous operation in the world.

== Early life ==
Edward Rushton was born in Liverpool, Lancashire on 13 November 1756. He was enrolled at the Liverpool Free School from the age of 6 until the age of 9. He left school and at the age of 11 he became an apprentice with Messrs. Watt and Gregson, a firm that traded in the West Indies.

== Life at sea ==
Rushton quickly became an experienced sailor. For example, at age 16, he took the helm of a ship which the captain and crew were about to abandon and guided them safely back to Liverpool. Because of this event, he was promoted from his apprenticeship to the position of second mate. In addition, at the age of 17 he survived the sinking of a slave ship he was aboard while on the way back from Guinea.

Working with human cargo gave Rushton first-hand experience with the ways that slaves were treated, and caused him to become an abolitionist later in life. In 1773, the same year that he survived the ship sinking, Rushton was sailing to Dominica with human cargo when a highly contagious outbreak of ophthalmia struck many of the slaves. The disease spread quickly and Rushton was appalled with the conditions that the slaves had to endure, so he would sneak food and water to them. He also reprimanded the captain, and because of this he was ultimately charged with mutiny. However, his contact with the slaves during the outbreak caused him to contract ophthalmia himself, and he became completely blind in his left eye and developed a cataract-like condition in his right eye.

== Abolitionist and literary career in Liverpool ==
Unable to sail because of his blindness, Rushton returned to Liverpool and moved in with his sister. He was supported financially by his father, and hired local boys to come read to him every week. He began to learn more about politics and philosophy, and started writing about these topics through dictation to the boys. His first poem, The Dismembered Empire, was published in 1782. In it, he criticised the British government's handling of the American Revolution.

Rushton was married in 1784 to Isabelle Rain. His father tried to set him up to run a tavern and make some money, but he was unsuited to the work and continued to write. His rhetorical battle against the slave trade continued with The West Indian Eclogues, a poem which was published in 1787. Rushton continued writing, using his firsthand experience with the slave trade and other experiences at sea for inspiration. His poetry became popular and he gained a reputation as a radical abolitionist author. Thomas Clarkson even personally sought out Rushton to credit his contribution to the abolitionist movement.

Soon after the publication of The West Indian Eclogues, Rushton became the editor of the Liverpool Herald. However, this was short-lived due to his radical ideals. When Rushton's partner suggested that he retract a particularly radical editorial, Rushton resigned. This incident inspired the poem Will Clewline. He tried to become a bookseller as well, but his outspoken views did nothing but gain him enemies. Rushton made no attempts to censor his radical beliefs about the French Revolution or the social unrest in Britain. Rushton also wrote letters to his heroes George Washington and Thomas Paine criticising their relationship with slavery, but neither man replied. Rushton's letter to Washington was sent in July 1796 and read in part:

It will generally be admitted, Sir, and perhaps with justice, that the great family of mankind were nevermore benefited by the military abilities of any individual, than by those which you displayed during the American contest... By the flame which you have kindled every oppressed nation will be enabled to perceive its fetters... But it is not to the commander in chief of the American forces, nor to the president of the United States, that I have ought to address. My business is with George Washington of Mount Vernon in Virginia, a man who not withstanding his hatred of oppression and his ardent love of liberty holds at this moment hundreds of his fellow being in a state of abject bondage–Yes: you who conquered under the banners of freedom–you who are now the first magistrate of a free people are (strange to relate) a slave holder... Shame! Shame! That man should be deemed the property of man or that the name of Washington should be found among the list of such proprietors... ages to come will read with astonishment that the man who was foremost to wrench the rights of America from the tyrannical grasp of Britain was among the last to relinquish his own oppressive hold of poor unoffending negroes. In the name of justice what can induce you thus to tarnish your own well earned celebrity and to impair the fair features of American liberty with so foul and indelibile a blot?

On 20 February 1797, Rushton wrote on the letter he sent to Washington that "a few weeks ago it was returned under cover, without a syllable in reply."

== Work with the blind ==
Eventually, Rushton was able to make enough money from bookselling to live comfortably and educate his children. In the late 1780s, he became a member of the literary and philosophical society and began donating money to help blind paupers. This led to Rushton establishing the Liverpool School for the Indigent Blind, which opened in 1791, second only in the world to the Paris school. The school now exists under the name of The Royal School for the Blind, Liverpool.

In 1807, Rushton had an operation which allowed him to regain his sight. For the first time in 33 years, he was able to see his wife and children. In 1811, his wife Isabella and one of his daughters both died. Rushton died on 22 November 1814 of paralysis in Liverpool, Lancashire, England (UK).

== Collected works ==
- 1782 – The Dismembered Empire.
- 1787 – West-Indian eclogues
- 1788 – Neglected genius: or, Tributary stanzas to the memory of the unfortunate Chatterton
- 1796 – Expostulatory Letter to George Washington, of Mount Vernon, in Virginia, on his continuing to be a proprietor of slaves
- 1800 – Lucy's ghost. A marine ballad
- 1801 – Will Clewline
- 1806 – Poems
- 1824 – Poems and Other Writings, ed. William Shepherd.

== Legacy ==
Edward Rushton appeared as a featured character in "The Dark," an interactive installation hosted at the Dana Centre of the Science Museum, London in 2004. The work, described as "a specially created three-dimensional audio environment in which the echoes of virtual ghosts inhabited a haunted soundscape," enables visitors to "experience life on board a slave ship in the 18th century." As of 2012, "The Dark" is also available online as an interactive web site. In March 2016, the play Unsung has its premiere at the Everyman Theatre, Liverpool. It tells the story of how his friendship with a former African slave changes his life.

== See also ==
- List of 18th-century British working-class writers
- List of abolitionist forerunners
