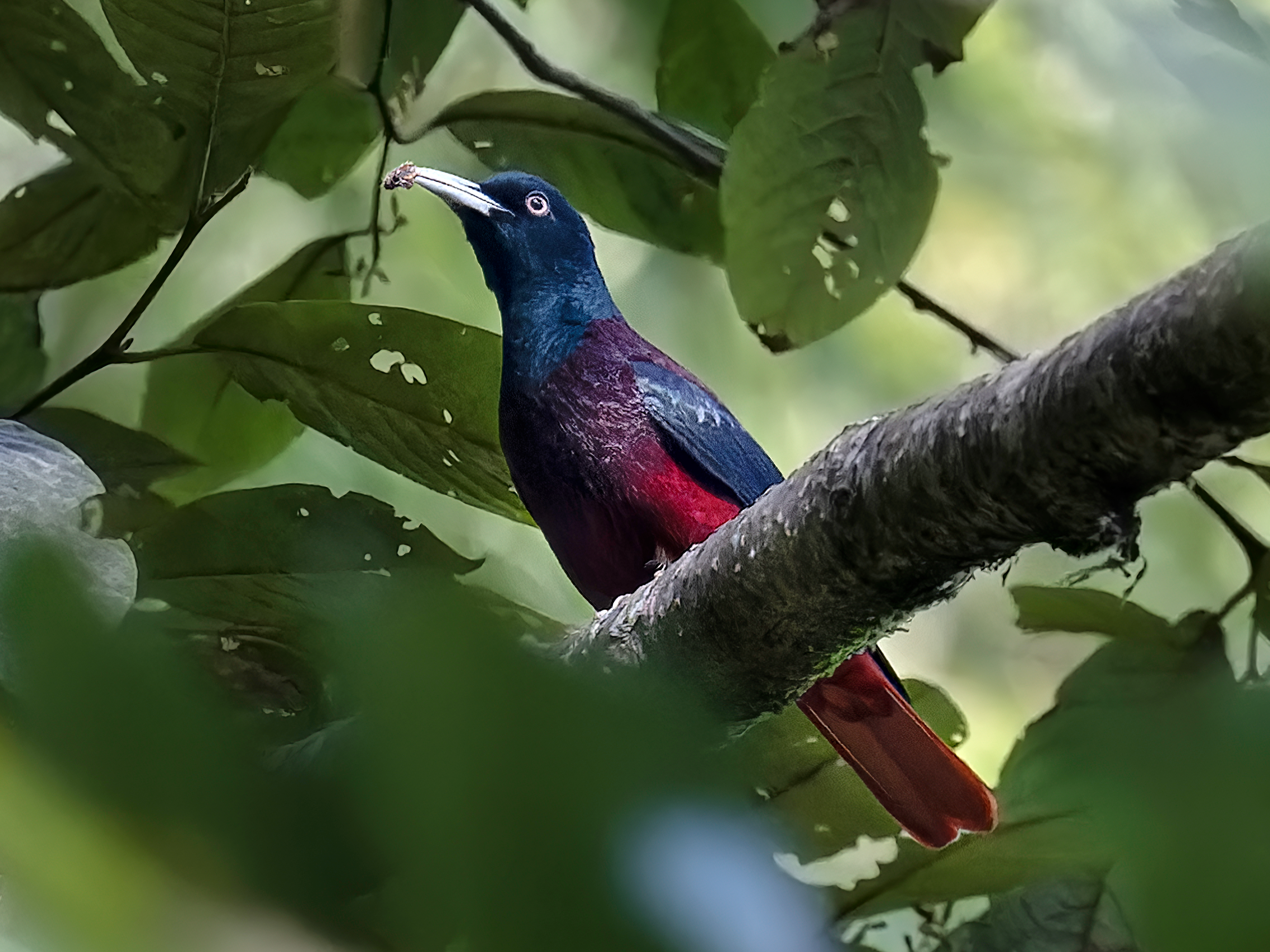
- Male O. t. traillii, West Bengal, India

Conservation status
- Least Concern (IUCN 3.1)

Scientific classification
- Kingdom: Animalia
- Phylum: Chordata
- Class: Aves
- Order: Passeriformes
- Family: Oriolidae
- Genus: Oriolus
- Species: O. traillii

Binomial name
- Oriolus traillii (Vigors, 1832)

Synonyms
- Pastor traillii

= Maroon oriole =

Species of bird

The maroon oriole (Oriolus traillii) is a species of bird in the family Oriolidae. It is found in Southeast Asia.

== Taxonomy ==
The maroon oriole was originally described in the genus Pastor. Along with the black, black-and-crimson and silver orioles, it belongs to a clade of red and black orioles.

Four subspecies are recognised:

- O. t. traillii – (Vigors, 1832) occurs from the Himalayas to southern China, northern Indochina and northern Thailand
- O. t. ardens – (R. Swinhoe, 1862) occurs in Taiwan
- O. t. nigellicauda – (Swinhoe, 1870) occurs on Hainan
- O. t. robinsoni – Delacour, 1927 occurs in southern Indochina

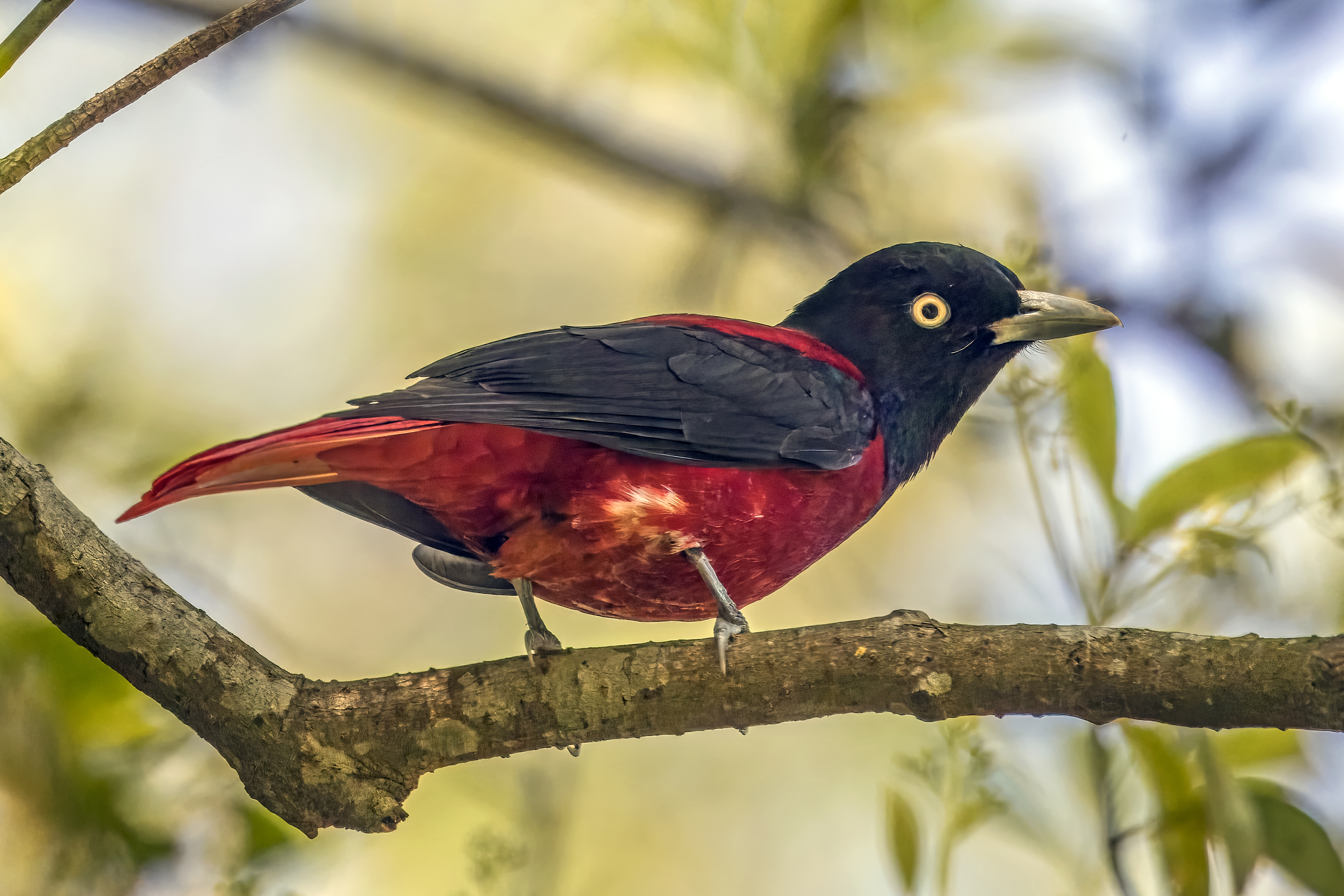
O. t. ardens, male, Xindian District, New Taipei City, Taiwan

The silver oriole of southern China was originally described by Stresemann as another subspecies of maroon oriole, but is now treated as a separate species; it is very similar, except that the red in the body plumage of the maroon oriole is replaced by silvery white. Genetic evidence has now shown that Stresemann's original assessment was accurate, with silver oriole genetically embedded among the subspecies of maroon oriole; the nominate subspecies of maroon oriole is more closely related to silver oriole, than it is to any of the other maroon oriole subspecies.

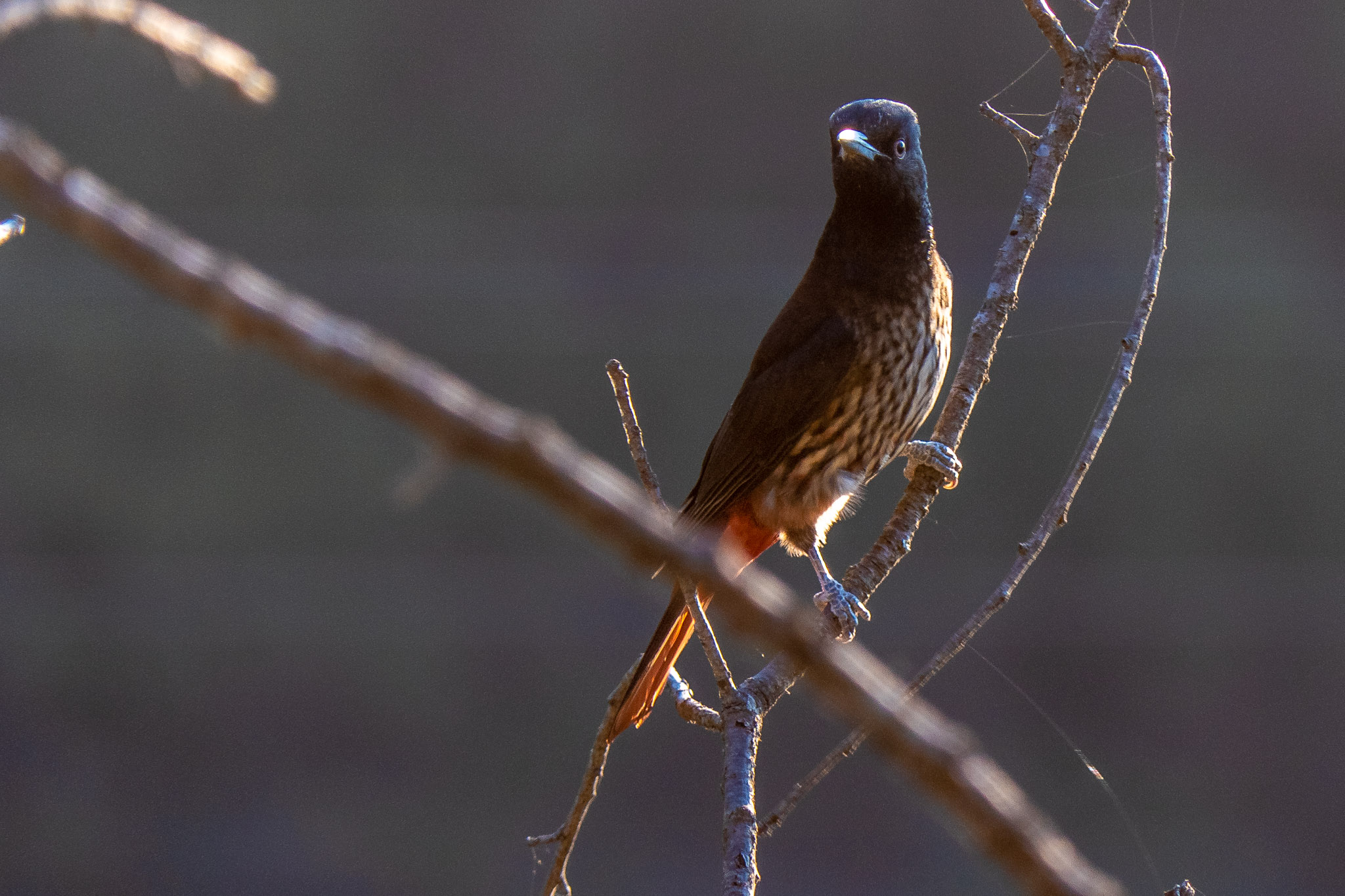
O. t. traillii, female; Uttarakhand, India

== Description ==
The maroon oriole is 25–28 cm long. Males have maroon and black plumage with a black head, neck and wings with a bluish beak. The females have slightly darker bodies and the juveniles have lighter bodies. The adult male is glossy crimson-maroon, with black head, neck and wings and a chestnut-maroon tail. The females and immature males have a greyish-white underpart with black streaks. The colour varies somewhat across the range, with those in the Indian Subcontinent having duller colours, and those in Southeast Asia having brighter colours, also tending to somewhat reddish tones.

== Distribution and habitat ==
The maroon oriole is found in Bangladesh, Bhutan, Cambodia, India, Laos, Myanmar, Nepal, Taiwan, Thailand, Tibet, and Vietnam. In India, it is found from Himachal Pradesh east to Arunachal Pradesh and the hills of Manipur.

Its natural habitat is subtropical or tropical moist lowland forests.

== Behaviour and ecology ==
The maroon oriole lives alone or in pairs. The nesting season is from April to May. The nest is a deep massive cup of bast fibre that is bound with cobwebs. Both male and female birds share the parental duties.

=== Diet and feeding ===
The maroon oriole eats wild figs, berries, insects and nectar.
