= Prince's Park, Liverpool =

Municipal park in Liverpool, England

Prince's Park
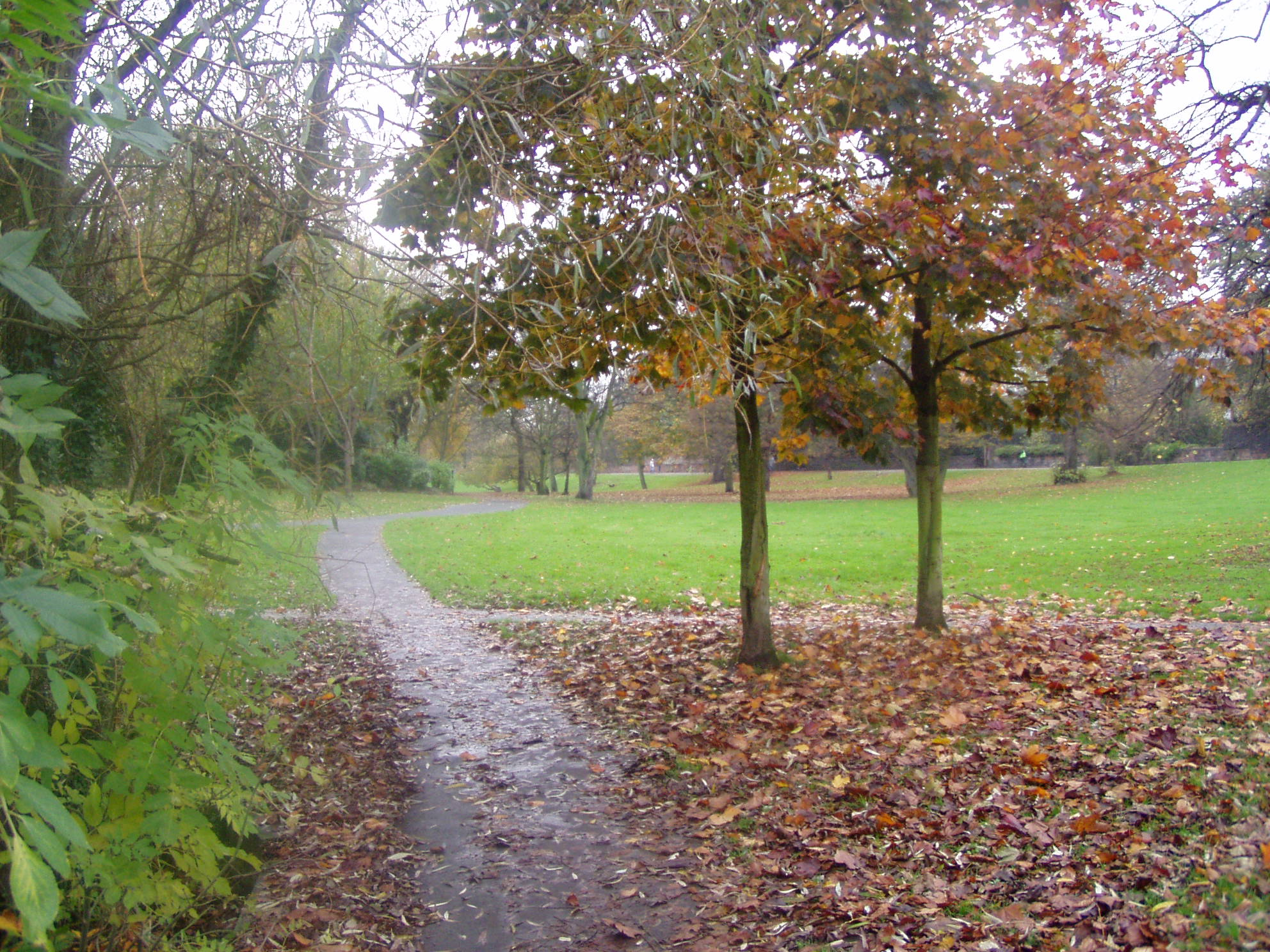
- Interactive map of Prince's Park
- Type: Public Park
- Location: Liverpool, England, UK
- Coordinates: 53.386°N 2.954°W
- Area: 111.197 acres (450,000 m^{2})
- Operator: Liverpool City Council
- Status: Open all year

Prince's Park (Note: Although many texts give the name without an apostrophe as Princes Park, this is an incorrect plural form. The park is named for one prince; Edward, Prince of Wales, only.) in Toxteth, Liverpool, England, is a 45 ha (110 acres) municipal park, 2 mi (3.2 km) south east of Liverpool city centre. In 2009, its status was upgraded to a Grade II* Historic Park by English Heritage.

== History ==
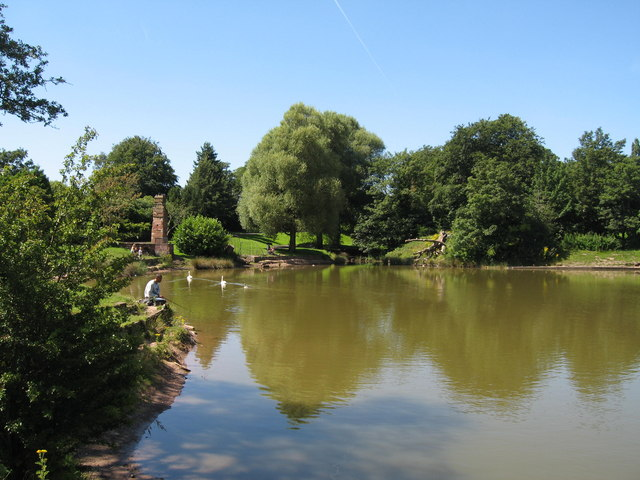
Prince's Park Lake

The park was originally a private development (though open to the public) by Richard Vaughan Yates, (Note: Richard Yates was a brother of Joseph Brooks Yates and John Ashton Yates.) the cost of which was expected to be met through the development of grand Georgian-style housing around the park.

Prince's Park was designed by Joseph Paxton and James Pennethorne, opened in 1842 and named for the newborn Edward, Prince of Wales. The plan was drawn by John Robertson and Edward Milner supervised the work. Construction was completed in 1843. The original gates can still be seen. With its serpentine lake and a circular carriage drive, the park set a style which was to be widely emulated in Victorian urban development, most notably by Paxton himself on a larger scale at Birkenhead Park. Prince's Park also influenced its near neighbour, Sefton Park.

Richard Yates gave the park to the city in 1849. In the August of the same year, the park was used for a fair, which was well-attended and raised money for local hospitals. The event included various marquees and a hot air balloon flight. A lithograph exists, which documents this event.

An obelisk and former drinking fountain in the park bears the inscription:

To the memory of Richard Vaughan Yates
The enlightened & philanthropic founder of Princes Park [sic]
Erected by public subscription 1858

During his time in Liverpool, James Martineau had a house in the park. Around 1863, the housing in the vicinity of the park contained the home of the parents of Edward Gordon Duff. Immediately prior to World War I, the headquarters of the 6th Rifle Battalion were based at Prince's Park Barracks. In 1918 the park was acquired by Liverpool City Council, becoming a fully public park.

Within the park is also a gravestone, dated 1926, in memory of a donkey called Judy who gave "21 years of service", providing rides for children in the park. The Doric Lodge, which was situated by the Sunburst Gates at the main entrance, was destroyed by bombs in 1940.

There is a lake in the middle of the park, originally for boating, which is used today for fishing. The foundations of its formerly Grade II listed boathouse, which may have been built by John Robertson and which burnt down in the early 1990s, can still be seen at the south end.

== Grade II* historic park ==
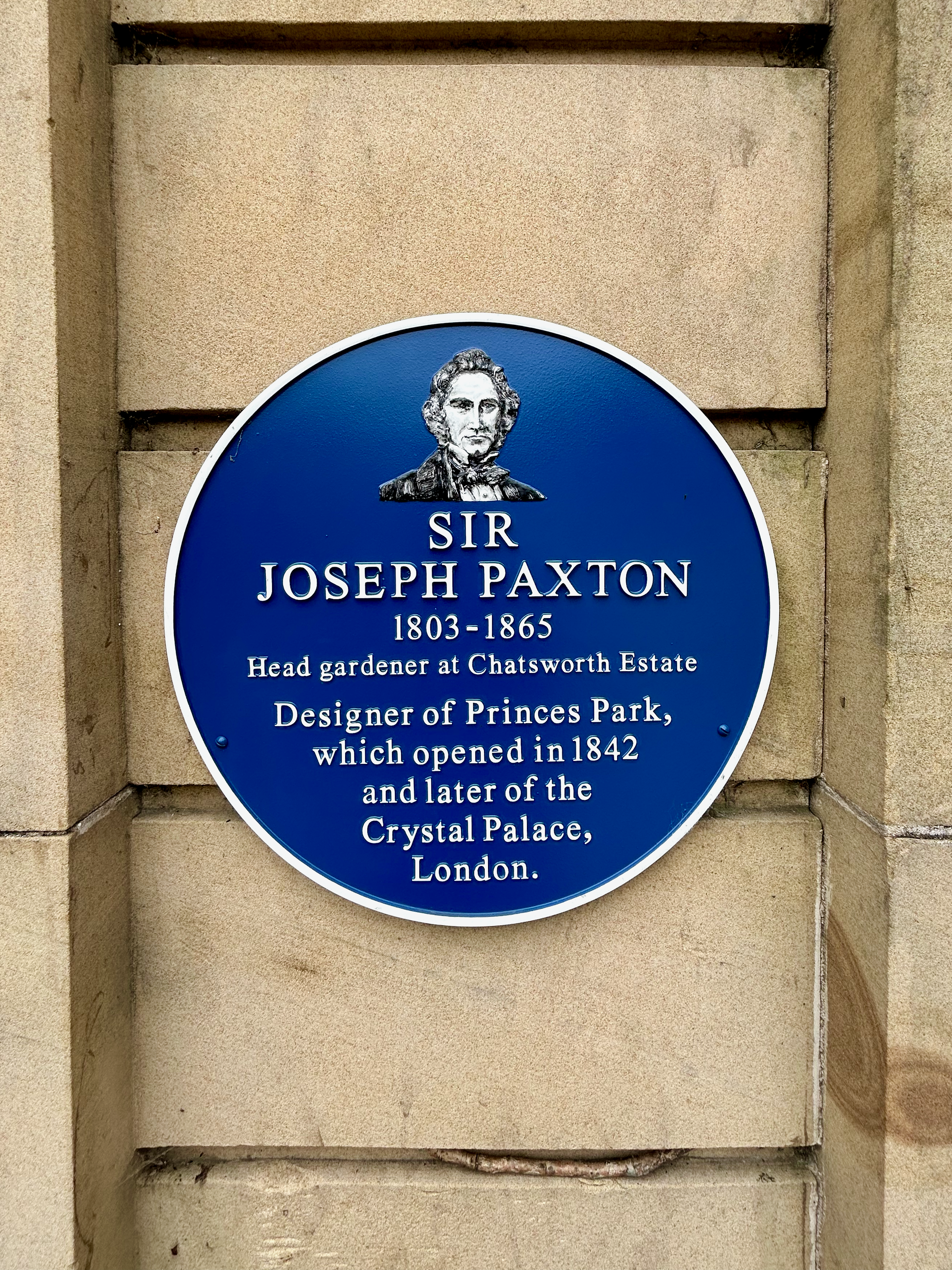
Plaque dedicated to the park's designer, Joseph Paxton, at Princes Gate

In 2009 the park had its status upgraded to a Grade II* Historic Park by English Heritage, making it one of five such parks in the city. English Heritage gave four reasons for upgrading the park's status. These were that it was the first major park created by Paxton, and that it inspired other designers, who incorporated elements of the park in other urban parks throughout the United Kingdom. In addition, the original look of the park is still intact and it is also an important example of a green haven in a city setting.

== Sports ==
Prince's Park currently hosts a free, weekly, timed 5 km (3.1 mi) running event as part of the parkrun organisation. It regularly attracts over 600 runners from the local area who enjoy running the course, taking in the whole park. Prince's Park also offers 4 public tennis courts, which are used year-round
