= John Bostock (physician) =

English physician, scientist and geologist (1773–1846)

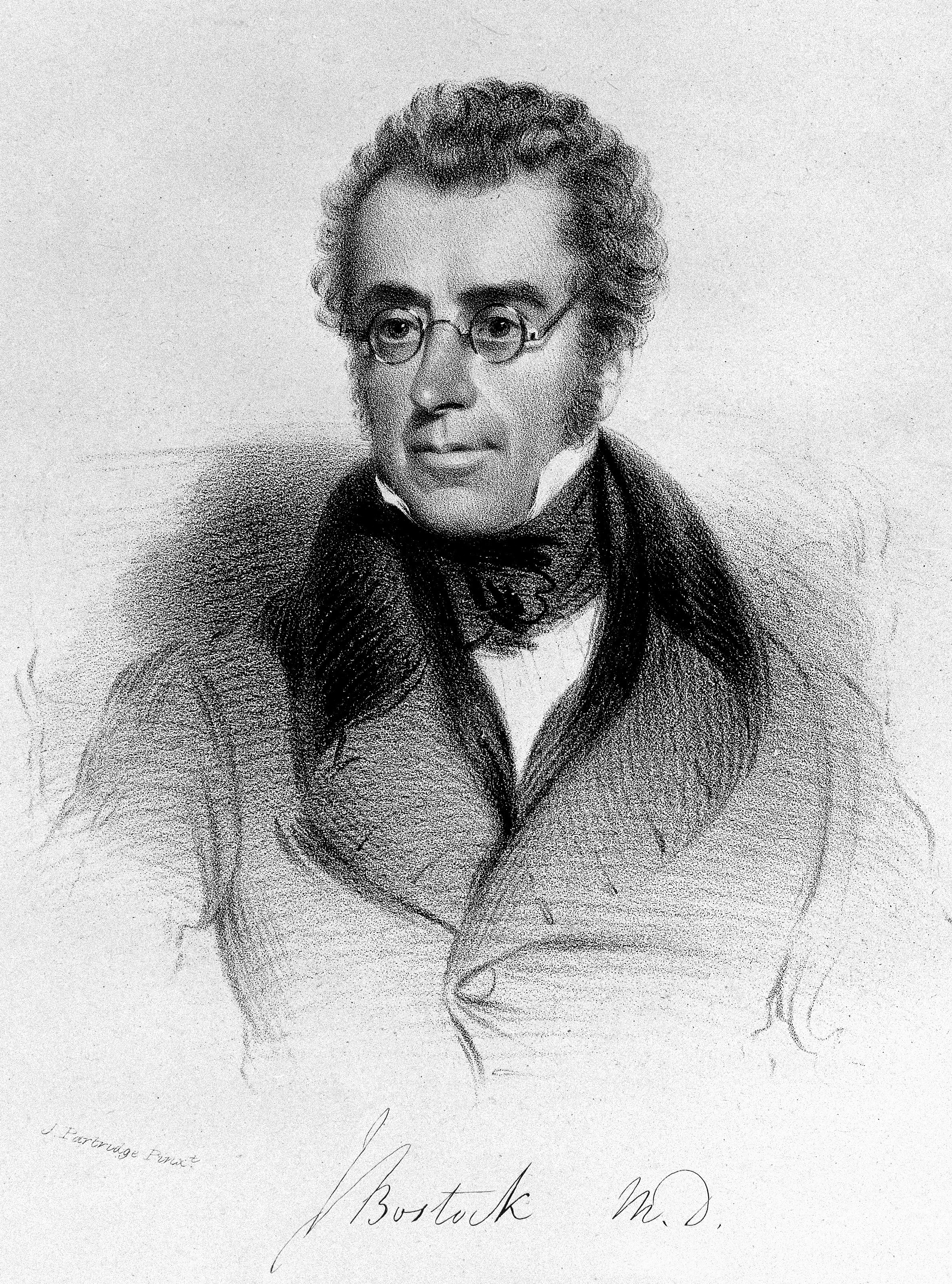
John Bostock c. 1836

John Bostock, Jr. FRS (baptised 29 June 1773, died 6 August 1846) was an English medical doctor, scientist and geologist from Liverpool.

== Life ==
Bostock was a son of Dr. John Bostock, Sr. He spent some time at New College at Hackney where he attended Joseph Priestley's lectures on chemistry and natural philosophy, before graduating in Medicine at the University of Edinburgh and practising medicine in Liverpool. He moved to London in 1817 where he concentrated on general science.

In 1819, Bostock was first to accurately describe hay fever as a disease that affected the upper respiratory tract. He lectured on chemistry at Guy's Hospital and was President of the Geological Society of London in 1826 when that body was granted a Royal Charter and Vice President of the Royal Society in 1832.

Bostock died of cholera in 1846; He is buried in the Kensal Green Cemetery, London.

== Works ==
Bostock was one of the first chemical pathologists. He was the first to realise the relationship between the diminution of urea in urine as it rose in the blood, while the albumin in the blood fell as that in the urine increased. His most noted book, System of Physiology, appeared in 1824.

His only geological work was On the Purification of Thames Water which appeared in 1826. He also collaborated with Henry Thomas Riley on a translation and annotation of Pliny the Elder's Natural History, which was published posthumously.

== Family ==
He married Ann Whitehead at Walton, Liverpool in 1813 and they had a daughter named Elizabeth Anne Bostock in 1817. She devoted her life to improving the supply of women's education. His wife outlived him and died in 1861.
