= Hope Street Unitarian Chapel =

Church in Liverpool, England

Coordinates: 53°24′3.6″N 2°58′13.8″W

Hope Street Chapel was a Unitarian place of worship in Liverpool, England. It stood on Hope Street next to the Philharmonic Hall, Liverpool, about halfway between the Anglican and Catholic Cathedrals. The congregation had previously been based in Paradise Street and before that in Kaye Street. The church was opened in 1849, and demolished in 1962.

== History ==
There was a presbyterian congregation in Kaye Street (or Key Street), Liverpool when Christopher Bassnett was appointed minister there in 1709. He was there until his death in 1744, assisted by John Brekell from about 1729. Brekell took over, and was pastor then to his death in 1769. His assistant from 1767, Philip Taylor, succeeded him, after a period when presbyterian dissent had been in retreat in the city.

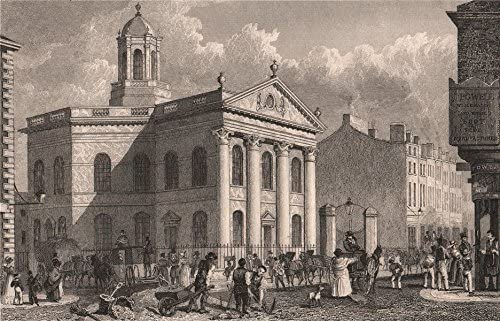
Paradise Street Chapel, Liverpool, 1829 engraving

In 1777 John Yates, a Unitarian, became the minister at the Kaye Street Chapel. In 1791 the congregation moved with him to Paradise Street Chapel, from which he retired in 1823. After Pendlebury Houghton had been minister for about a year, John Grundy took over. James Martineau joined him as a colleague in 1832, and Grundy, in poor health, stepped down in 1835. Martineau had a Gothic church built in 1848, in Hope Street, and the congregation moved there.

After 1857, when Martineau left, the ministers at Hope Street to 1883 were:

- William Henry Channing
- Charles Wicksteed
- Alexander Gordon
- Edmund Martin Geldart
- Charles John Perry (1852–1883).

== See also ==
Other Unitarian churches in Liverpool include:

- Octagon Chapel, Liverpool
- Renshaw Street Unitarian Chapel
- Toxteth Unitarian Chapel
- Ullet Road Unitarian Church
