= Lloyd Street Chapel, Llanelli =

Former chapel in Llanelli, Wales

Coordinates: 51.679796°N 4.164326°W

Lloyd Street, Llanelli was an Independent (Congregationalist) chapel in Lloyd Street, Llanelli, Carmarthenshire. Services at Lloyd Street were conducted in the Welsh language.

The chapel was established in 1886 after a number of members decided to leave the neighbouring Tabernacle church. Tabernacle had been bitterly divided during the ministry of the Rev J. Pandy Williams when the church became embroiled in a row about the constitution of the Bala Theological College. During his ministry a large group of members left to establish Ebenezer and when Pandy Williams left Tabernacle a number of his supporters decided that they could not remain members of the church. On 21 March 1886 members of this group held a meeting at Lakefield School and they included Dr J. A. Jones and Joseph Williams, both of whom were prominent public figures in the town. The church was incorporated on 9 April 1886 and within seventeen months they had built a new chapel in Lloyd Street, ironically within walking distance of Tabernacle.

On 12 July 1887 a memorial stone was laid by Sir Arthur Stepney during a service led by Thomas Johns of Capel Als, Thomas Davies of Siloah and Dewi Medi of Dock Chapel. The formal opening took place over three days from 28 until 30 August 1887.

In 1931, J. Camwy Evans, a native of the Welsh 'colony' in Patagonia, where his parents had emigrated from Crug-y-bar, Carmarthenshire in 1878. Evans had come to Wales as a young man, with little English, to train for the ministry and after sixteen years at Pen-ref Chapel, Caernarfon, he moved to Llanelli. At Caernarfon, Evans had played a prominent role in public life but at Llanelli he concentrated on the chapel and pastoral work. In his history of Llanelli's chapels, Huw Edwards speculates on the reasons for Evans's departure in 1947 to the much smaller church at Nebo, Blaengarw where he remained for seven years before retiring to North Wales.

The chapel closed in June 1991 and the building subsequently suffered from vandalism. The Nicholson organ was smashed by vandals who used the pipes as spears to destroy the ornate ceiling. Eventually the building was demolished in 1997.

The site has been redeveloped with offices of the Probation Service.

== Sources ==
- Edwards, Huw (2009). Capeli Llanelli. Our Rich Heritage. Carmarthenshire County Council. pp. 177–203. ISBN 978-0-906821-77-0.
