= Owen Roberts (disambiguation) =

Owen Roberts (1875–1955) was Associate Justice of the United States Supreme Court.

Owen Roberts may also refer to:

- Owen Roberts (aviator) (1912–1953), British Royal Air Force aviator and founder of Caribbean International Airways
- Owen Roberts (educator) (1835–1915), Welsh educationalist
- Owen W. Roberts (1924–2017), US diplomat and former United States Ambassador to Togo
- Owen F. T. Roberts (1896–1968), British meteorologist
- Owen Morris Roberts (1832–1896), English-born Welsh architect and surveyor

== See also ==
- Owen Roberts International Airport, Grand Cayman, Cayman Islands
