= David Glyn Bowen =

Welsh theologian and educator (1933–2000)

David Glyn Bowen (29 November 1933 – 15 May 2000) was a Welsh Congregationalist minister, educator, and missionary. He was a lecturer of religious studies at Bradford College and was principal of Malua Theological College in Western Samoa.

== Early life ==
Bowen was born in the Swansea area of Wales on 29 November 1933. His parents were Violet (née Beynon) and Henry Bowen, a grocer. He attended Swansea Grammar School from 1945 to 1952.

Bowen studied Hebrew at University College, Cardiff, graduating with an A.B. in 1955 with honours. He graduated in 1958 with a B.D. from Memorial College, Brecon. Bowen received a grant from the World Council of Churches which allowed him earn a MTh from Princeton University in the United States in 1959. His thesis was about the Church of South India. While he was in the United States, Bowen met the Dalai Lama while at the New York City offices of the World Council of Churches for an interview. He earned a PhD from the University of Leeds in 1985 for his thesis The Sathya Sai Baba Hindu Community in Bradford.

== Career ==
After returning to Wales in 1960, Bowen was ordained of minister of Castle Street Congregational Church in Tredegar, Monmouthshire. He served as the congregation's minister for three years. From 1963 to 1968, Bowen was the principal of Malua Theological College in Western Samoa, under the sponsorship of the London Missionary Society.

He returned to the United Kingdom in 1968 where he was a teacher in the multi-racial community of Stepney, London. He also was a part-time minister in Debden, Epping Forest. He became lecturer in religious studies at Bradford Training College in 1973, remaining there until his retirement as a senior lecturer in 1999.

In 1988, Bowen was the official commentator for the first Hindu service to be televised in Britain. He published The Sathya Sai Baba Hindu Community in Bradford, a book based on his PhD thesis, in 1988. His poem "Who's Jesus Anyway?" was published in Coracle in April 1999; revised as "Gentle Jesus, the Controversialist", the poem was published in Welsh in Cristion, in July 2000.

== Personal life ==
Bowen married Gerda Hofmaier in 1963. She was from Ulm, West Germany, and met Bowen at a summer work camp that he organized in Swansea. They had two sons, Steffan and Ceri.

Bowen served as a trustee of the Friends of the Ironbridge Gorge Museum.

Bowen died of cancer in the Bradford hospital on 15 May 2000. His funeral was held at Little Lane Church in Bradford. His remains were cremated.
