= Thomas Johns (minister) =

Welsh minister (1836–1914)

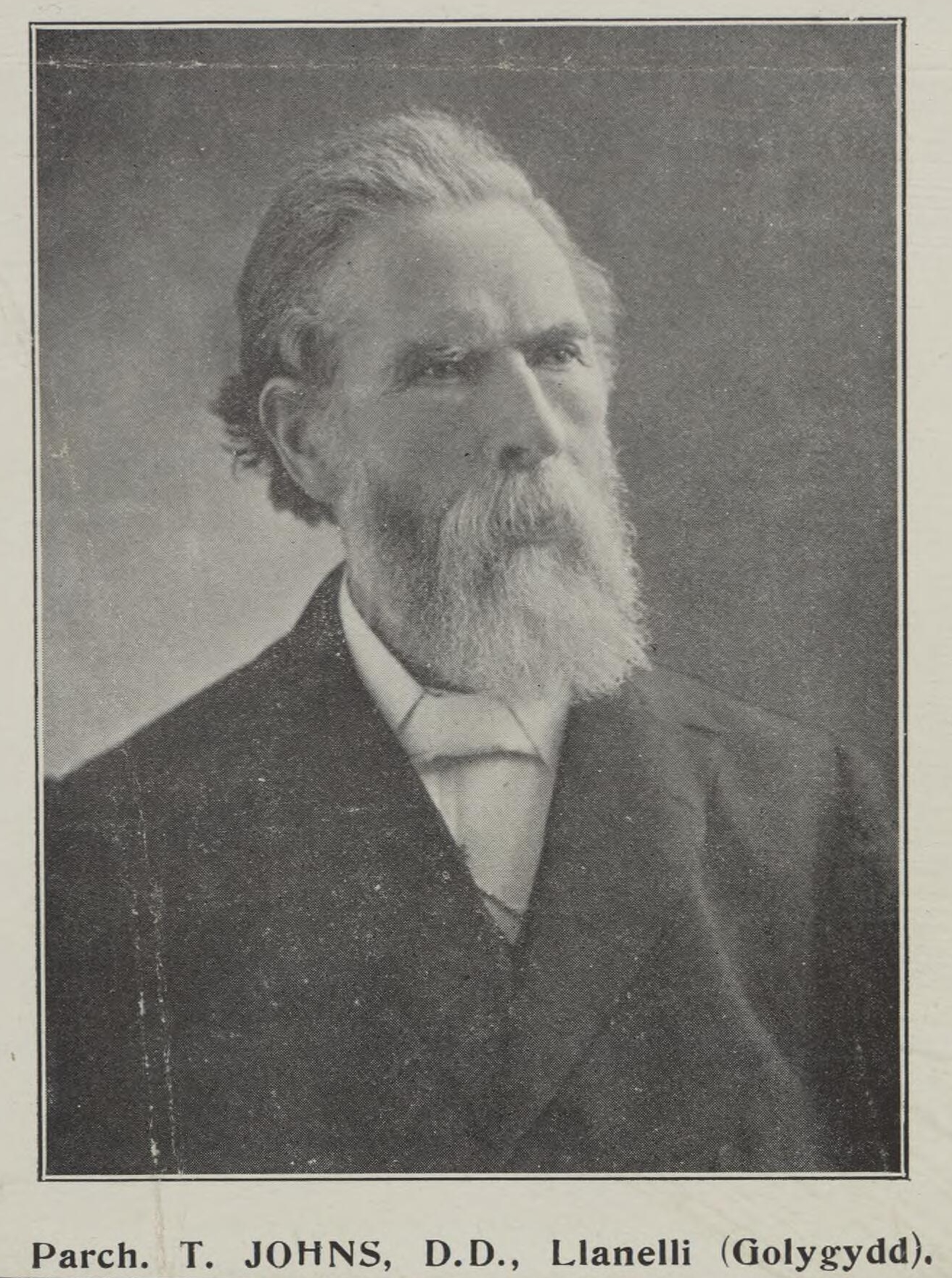
Thomas Johns around 1900

Thomas Johns (26 November 1836 – 1914) was a Welsh Independent (Congregationalist) minister, best known for his pastorate at Capel Als, Llanelli, one of the largest chapels in Wales, from 1869 until his death in 1914.

== Early life and career ==
Thomas Johns was born in Llanwrda, Carmarthenshire, on 26 November 1836. At the age of thirteen he was received into church membership at Tabor, Llanwrda, by Thomas Jones, the father to Brynmor Jones. He began to preach in 1858 and the following year he attended Llandovery School before training for the ministry at Brecon Theological College. His first pastorate was at Ebenezer. Caernarfonshire, now known as Deiniolen.

Johns's ministry at Deiniolen was not without its challenges and his biographer Gwilym Rees (Note: Gwilym Rees was married to Johns's daughter. His biography contains a detailed account of Johns's life and career) claims that the congregation proved argumentative and undisciplined. Rees also states that the source of contention was Johns's insistence on electing more deacons than some members of the congregation thought necessary and also his efforts to abolish certain traditions deemed incompatible with Christian belief.

His ministry coincided with the 1868 General Election, when the Liberal candidate, Love Jones-Parry defeated the Conservative, who happened to be the son and heir of Baron Penrhyn. Johns was one of the few ministers to publicly support the Liberal candidate and he was outspoken in his efforts. At a meeting in Llanberis in October, attended by over a thousand people, Johns spoke alongside John Griifith (Gohebydd) and the candidate himself. The following month, at the village of Ebenezer itself, Johns proposed a motion that the constituency had been misrepresented for 72 years. Following Jones Parry's victory, the Congregationlaist journal, Y Tyst Cymreig, in an editorial recording the contribution of ministers to the victory, singled out Johns as one of the younger ministers who played a decisive role.

== Ministry at Llanelli ==
In 1869, he received a unanimous invitation to succeed David Rees as pastor of Capel Als. The invitation was accepted, and thus began a connection with Llanelly which remained until his death.

A new schoolroom was built early in his pastorate, and in 1875 a group of members were released to form a new church at Tabernacle, towards the cost of which Capel Als contributed a significant sum. Several hundred members transferred from Capel Als to the new church at Tabernacle, and it was hoped that this would ease the over-crowding at Capel Als, which suffered from poor ventilation and was uncomfortable especially when the chapel was full as it was for the Sunday evening service every week.

In 1895, Capel Als itself was re-built at a cost of £5,000. Johns played a prominent role in the establishment of the Welsh Congregationalist Union, of which he was president in 1890.

== Public life ==
Johns did not confine his activities to the pulpit and became a leading member of both the Llanelly School Board and Carmarthenshire County Council.

Thomas Johns died in September 1914, shortly after the outbreak of the First World War. One of his last public acts was to declare his support for the war effort. He was buried at Llanelli Cemetery.

== Sources ==
- Rees, Gwilym (1929). Cofiant y Parch Thomas Johns, Capel Als, Llanelli. Llanelli: James Davies.
- Edwards, Huw (2009). Capeli Llanelli. Our Rich Heritage. Carmarthenshire County Council. ISBN 978-0-906821-77-0.
