= Ebenezer Chapel, Llanelli =

Former chapel in Llanelli, Carmarthenshire, Wales

Coordinates: 51°40′45″N 4°09′42″W

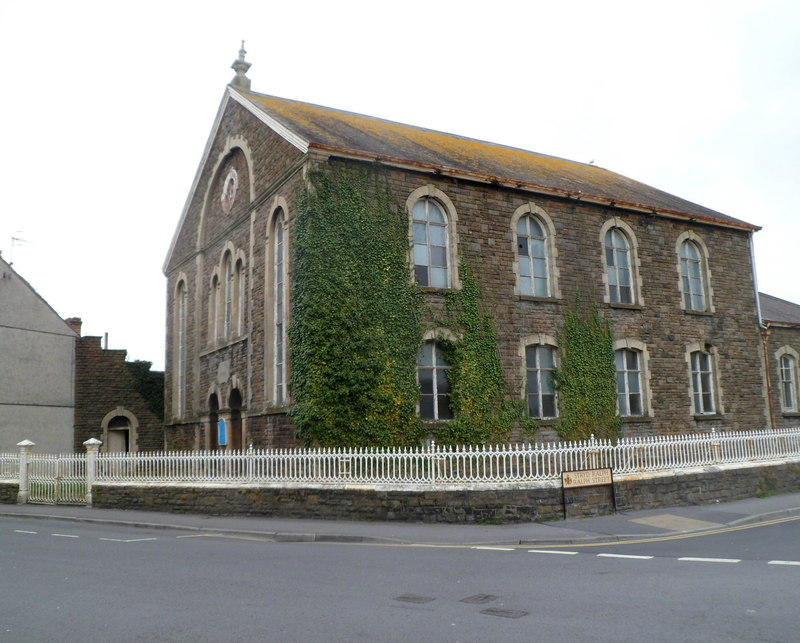
Ebenezer Chapel

Ebenezer was an Independent (Congregationalist) chapel in Inkerman Street, Llanelli, Carmarthenshire, Wales. Services at Ebenezer were conducted in the Welsh language.

The chapel was established in the 1880s after a number of members were expelled from the neighbouring Tabernacle church. The building was designed by the prolific chase builder, Thomas Thomas of Landore, at a cost of around £2,000. It could accommodate 800 people.

T. Orchwy Bowen became minister in 1909 and remained until 1921. In 1917 he rejected a call to minister at Trefgarne Church in Pembrokeshire.

The chapel remained open longer than any other Congregationalist chapels in the town, apart from Capel Als and Tabernacle.

== Sources ==
- Edwards, Huw (2009). Capeli Llanelli. Our Rich Heritage. Carmarthenshire County Council. pp. 177–203. ISBN 978-0-906821-77-0.
