= Siloah Chapel, Llanelli =

Former chapel in Llanelli, Carmarthenshire, Wales

Coordinates: 51.672759°N 4.163982°W

Siloah was an Independent (Congregationalist) chapel in Copperworks Road, Seaside, Llanelli, Carmarthenshire. Services at Siloah were conducted in the Welsh language.

The chapel was established in 1841 at a time when Llanelli Docks were rapidly expanding and industrial development was being driven apace by entrepreneurs such as the Nevill family. David Rees of Capel Als was the driving force behind the new cause. Siloah was consecrated on 14 January 1841 with 116 members leaving Capel Als to form the new congregation. David Rees acted as minister of the new church for the first year.

== The ministry of Thomas Rees, 1842–49 ==
Siloah's first full-time minister, Thomas Rees, came to Llanelli after a brief ministry at Ebenezer, Trecynon, Aberdare. Rees was installed at services held on 26 and 27 July 1842 although he had commenced his ministry on 15 March. A native of Llanfynydd in rural Carmarthenshire, Thomas Rees had spent time as a miner before entering the ministry. Later, he became a prominent figure within his denomination, served on two occasions as president of the Union of Welsh Independents, and he made a notable contribution to the history of Congregationalism in Wales. Huw Edwards suggests that there was some disquiet at Siloah over his absences in London during his ministry, pursuing his political and literary interests.

In 1849, Rees moved to Beaufort, Ebbw Vale and he was succeeded by David Davies, a student from Brecon Theological College, who was ordained on 3 October 1849. However, his ministry lasted for only three years.

== The ministry of Thomas Davies, 1854–98 ==
Thomas Davies, born in Carmarthenshire but who began preaching at Bethania, Dowlais came to Siloah in 1854 when the church had 194 members. By 1872 this figure increased to 409 and to 490 by 1891.

It was enlarged in 1855 to the design of architect Thomas Thomas of Landore.

During his long ministry at Siloah, Davies built up a strong following, which was reflected in the tributes which appears after his death. Huw Edwards declares that "even by the proposteraous standards of the time, they are impossibly inflated." Edwards presents him as a controversial figure who at times reveled in confrontation, whether, disrupting a Unitarian meeting which he considered inappropriate worship, campaigning against alcohol, or opposing Sunday burials.

The same pattern can be seen in some of his political activities. Davies played a prominent role during the 1868 General Election, and was one of many nonconformist ministers who frequently spoke in favour of liberal candidates in both the Carmarthen county and borough constituencies. At Llanelli, Davies openly challenged Conservative candidate Henry Puxley at a disorderly meeting. Following Puxley;s departure, Davies together with other nonconformist ministers from the town, mounted the platform and passed a motion of confidence in the Liberal candidate.

Like many Victorian nonconformist ministers, Davies was awarded a doctorate in theology; in his case by Iowa College in the United States. Edwards speculates that this was probably an honorary degree but also suggests that it may have been awarded for some academic research given Davies's interest in scientific subjects. When he was elevated to the presidency of the Union of Welsh Independents in 1880, his address was on the "theological and scientific stirrings" of the age. Welcomed by some observers, Dr John Thomas of Liverpool considered it unworthy of a presidential address.

The climax of Davies's ministry was probably the series of meetings in May 1891 to mark the 50th anniversary of the church, which were reported to have attracted large crowds. The celebratory services were arranged, in part, to clear the chapel's debts.

== Twentieth century ==
The next minister was Elias Davies, who was killed in an accident in 1908. Over two thousand people attended his funeral. Later ministers were D. Huws Jones (1917–52), Wilfred Price (1954–69), Gwyn Rhys (1972–77) and D. Luther Owen (1978–83). After years of decline, Siloah closed in 2005.

== Sources ==
- Edwards, Huw (2009). Capeli Llanelli. Our Rich Heritage. Carmarthenshire County Council. pp. 89–108. ISBN 978-0-906821-77-0.
