= David Miall Edwards =

Welsh writer and theologian

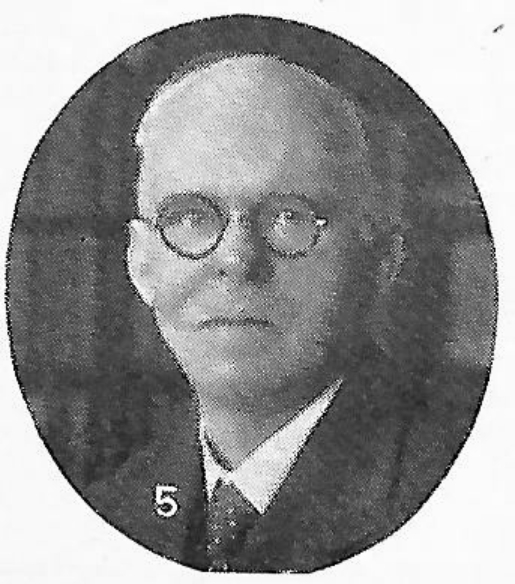
D Miall Edwards

David Miall Edwards (22 January 1873 – 29 January 1941) was a Welsh Non-conformist writer and theologian who wrote in both Welsh and English.

Edwards was born in Llanfyllin, Montgomeryshire (now Powys) in 1873. He was educated at Bala-Bangor Theological Seminary and Mansfield College, Oxford. After a period as a minister, he became a teacher of theology at Brecon Congregational Memorial College, Aberhonndu (Brecon), where he remained until his retirement in 1934. He died in Brecon on 29 January 1941.

He was editor of Y Dysgedydd (1915–18) and Yr Efrydydd ( 1920–28) and has been identified as a social liberal and 'one of Welsh Nonconformity's four main protagonists of social thinking', applying the gospel in political, economic, social and religious terms to the social conditions which had resulted from more than a century of industrialization. He also wrote contributions for the International Standard Bible Encyclopedia.

== Writings ==
- Crefydd a Bywyd (1915)
- Crist a Gwareiddiad (1921)
- The Philosophy of Religion (1923)
- Iaith a Diwylliant Cenedl (1927)
- Bannau'r Ffydd (1929)
- Christianity and Philosophy (1932)
- Crefydd a Diwylliant (1934)

== External sources ==
Publications page at amazon.co.uk
