= Owen Morris Roberts =

Owen Morris Roberts (1832 or 3 - 1896) was an English-born Welsh architect and surveyor.

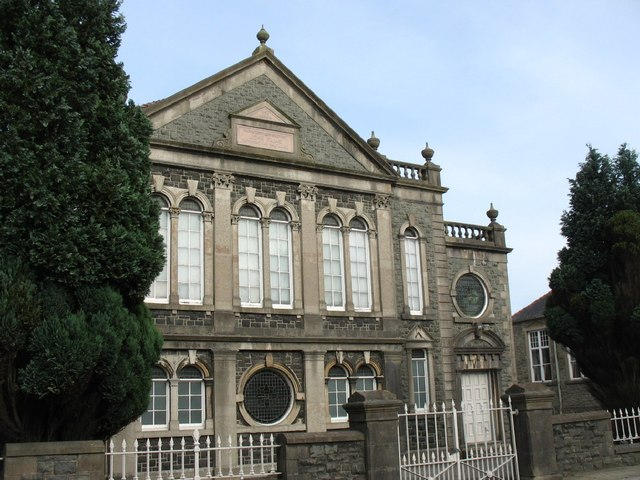
Capel Moreia, Llangefni, a design by Owen Morris Roberts

Roberts was born in Birkenhead, the son of Edward Roberts, a joiner from Porthmadog. The family returned to Porthmadog when Edward Roberts was employed on the rebuilding of Capel Tabernacl in the town. Roberts had originally been a ship's carpenter, but subsequently took over his father's joinery business, studied art and geometry with John Cambrian Rowland, and trained himself to become an architect. He went on to design a large number of chapels, particularly in North Wales, and other public buildings.

Roberts' surviving work includes Capel Moreia, Llangefni; remodelling of the now-listed Plough Lane Chapel, Brecon and the Rundbogenstil-inspired facade of Capel Bach, Rhos. He was responsible for the remodelling of Capel Als, Llanelli. Secular buildings produced by his firm include The Albert Hall, Llandrindod Wells. Many of his chapels are in the Italianate style, occasionally freely mixed with Classical elements, and often feature stair towers.

Roberts, who was a prominent member of the Liberal Party and a councillor for Merioneth, died in Porthmadog in 1896. His firm, Owen Morris Roberts & Son, went on to produce other chapel designs.

== Gallery ==
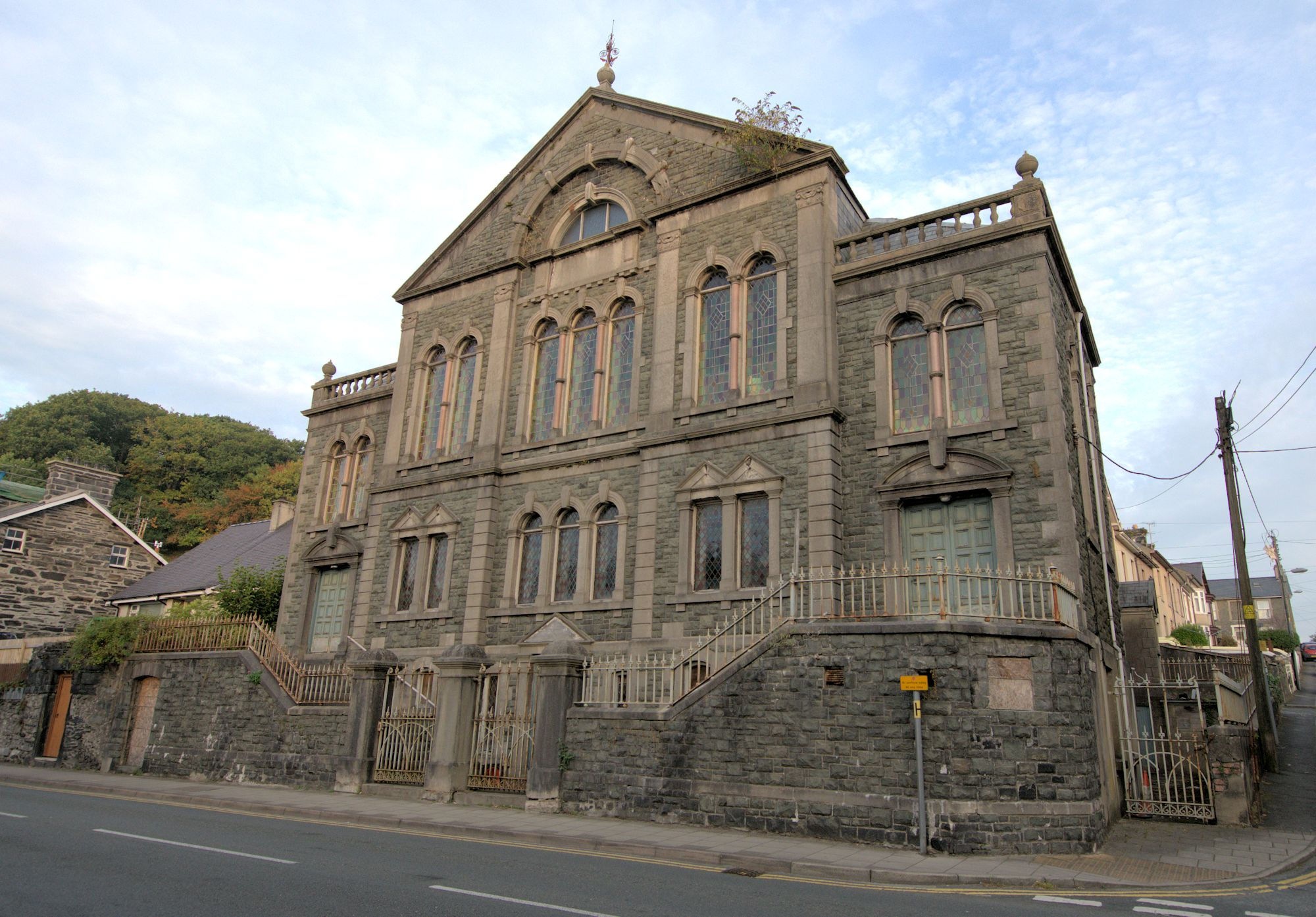
Capel y Garth, Porthmadog (1898)

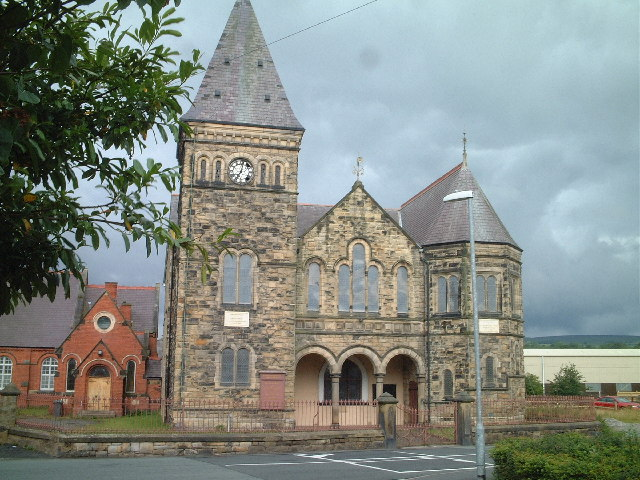
Capel Bach, Rhos; rebuilt to design by Roberts, 1889

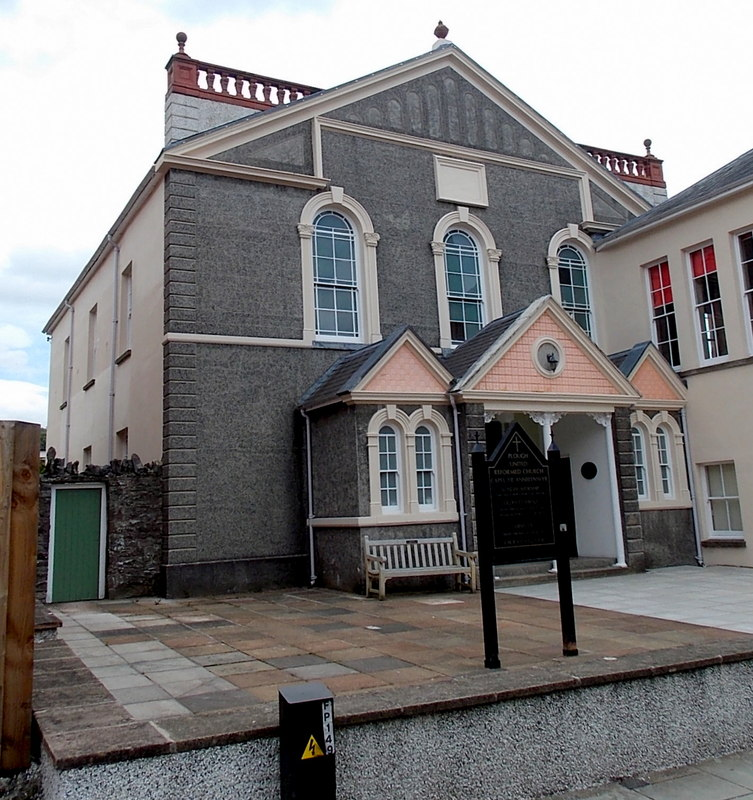
Plough Lane chapel, Brecon

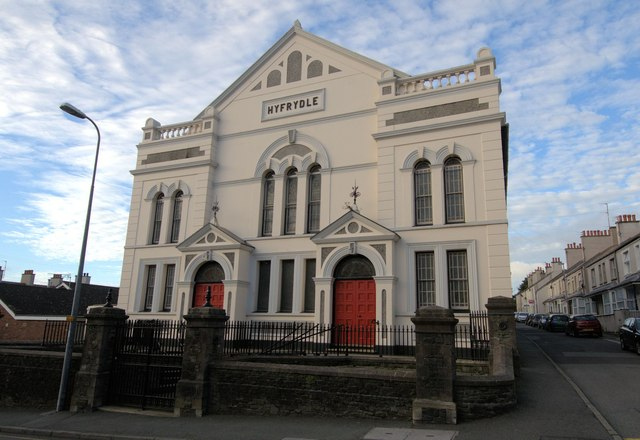
Hyfrydle, Holyhead

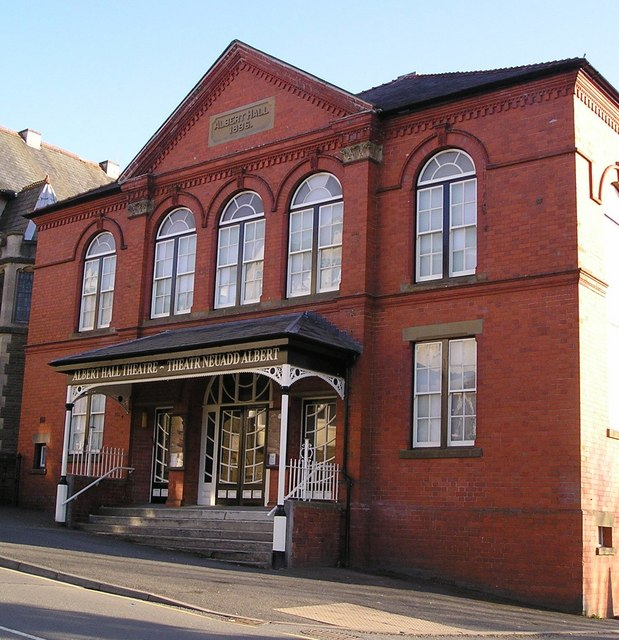
Albert Hall, Llandrindod Wells

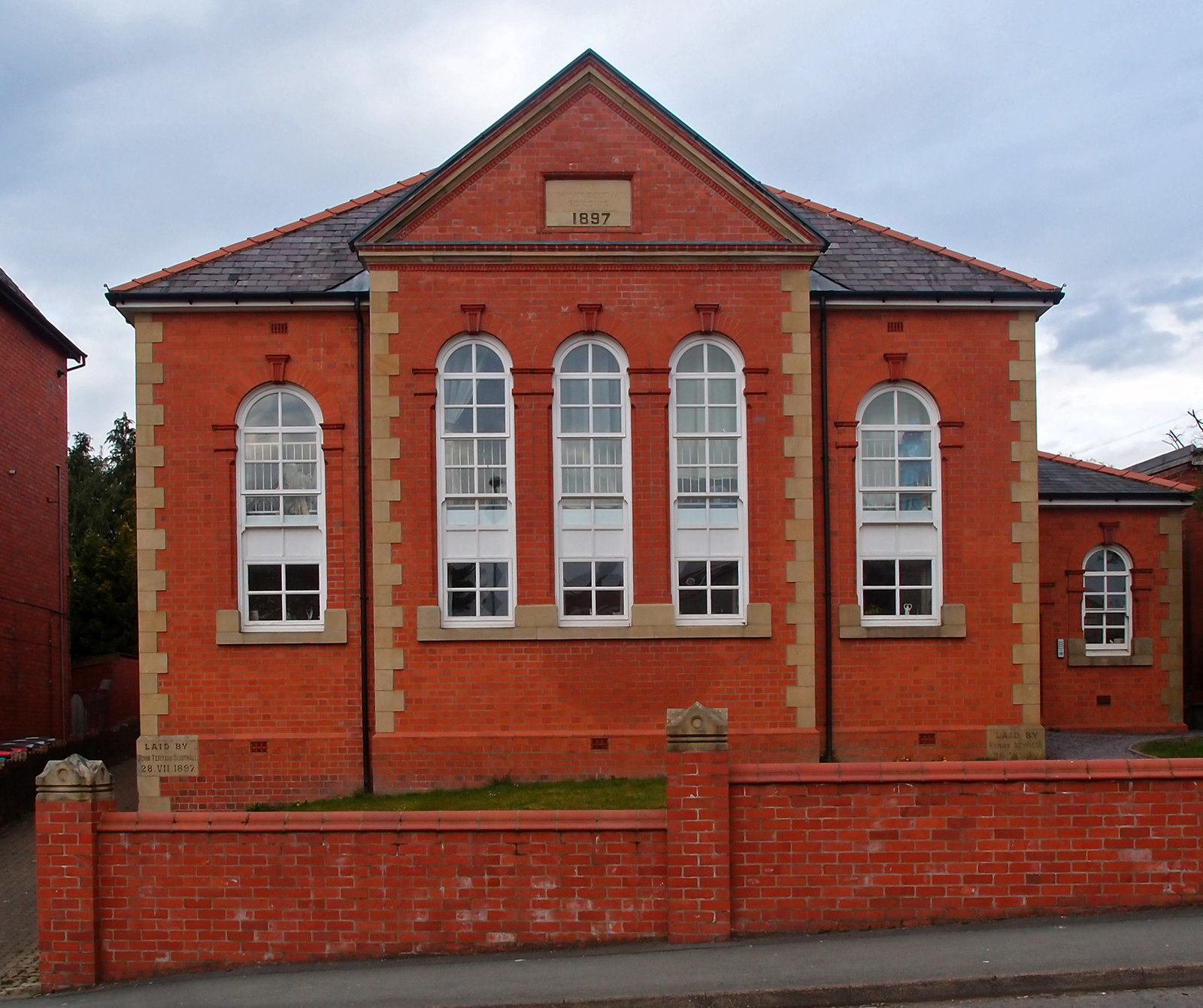
Former Quaker Meeting House, Llandrindod Wells (by Owen Morris Roberts & Son, 1897)

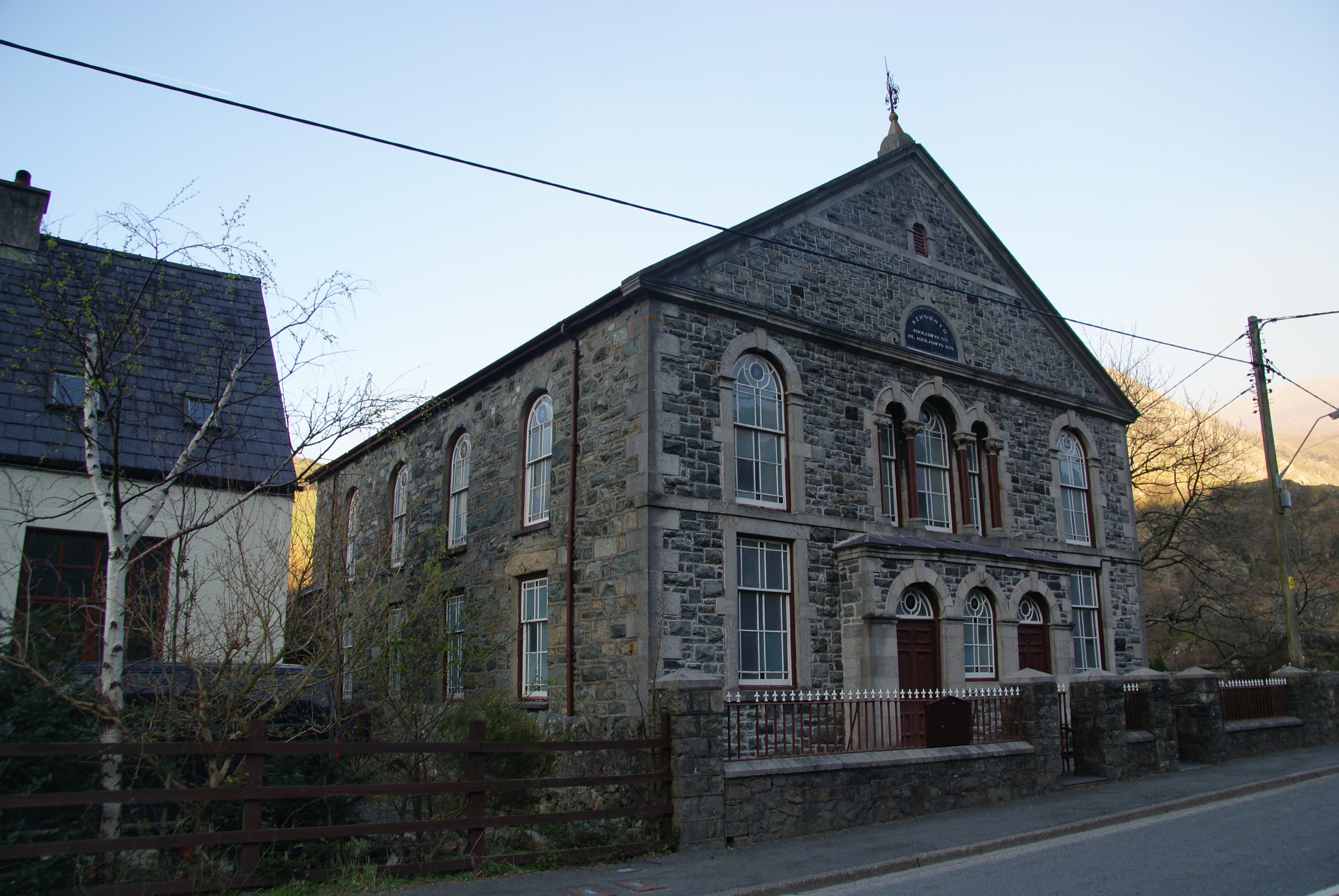
Rehoboth, Nant Peris, rebuilt by Roberts in 1876

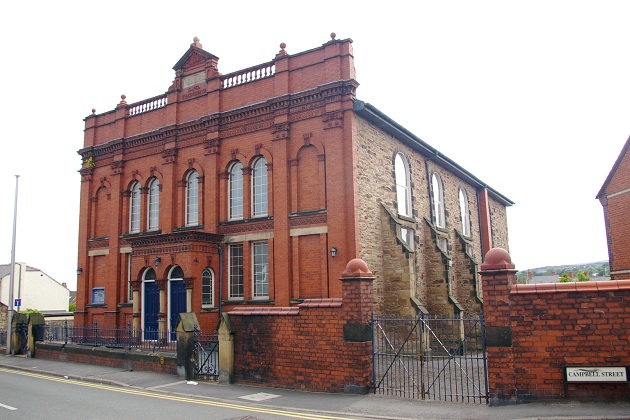
Penuel, Rhos; facade by Roberts, 1891

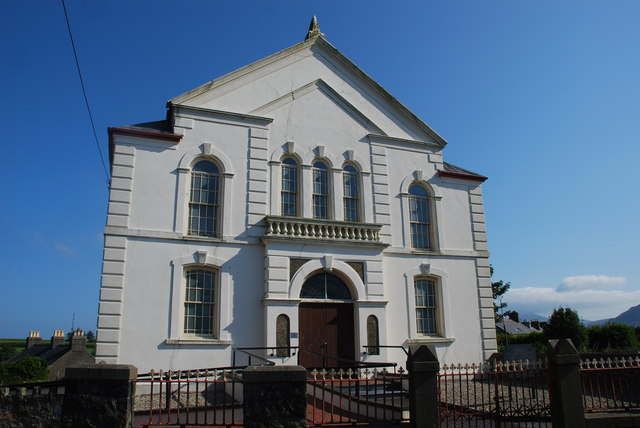
Moreia, Morfa Nefyn (1882)

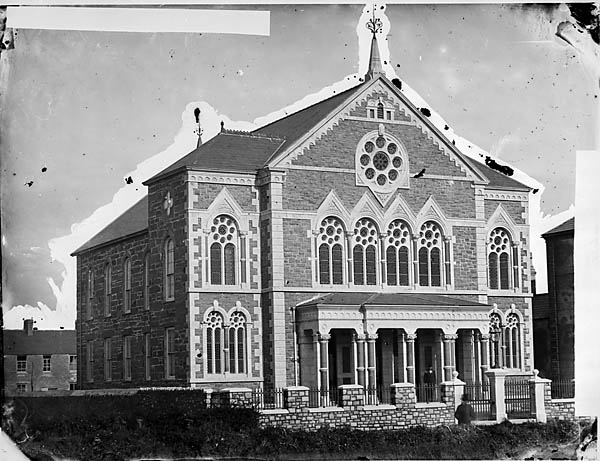
Capel Coffa Emrys, Porthmadog (1878; demolished c.1985)

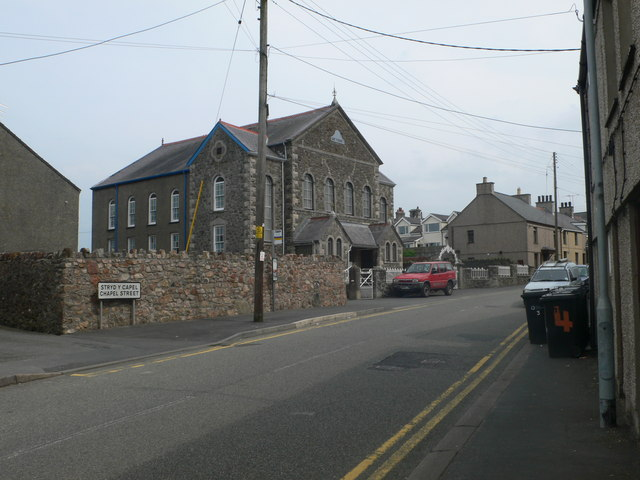
Horeb, Brynsiencyn (1881)

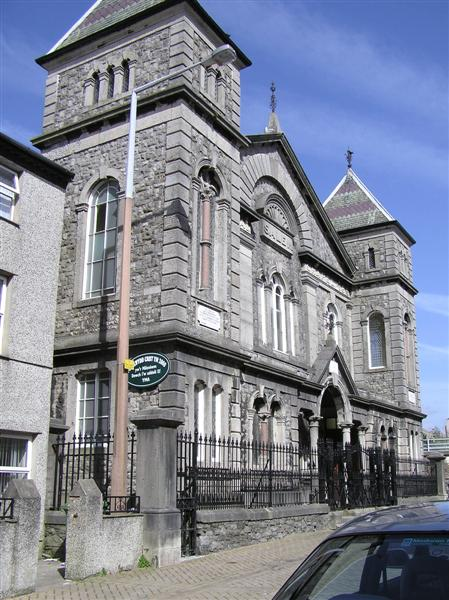
Salem Welsh Independent Chapel, Caernarfon; a design by Thomas Thomas extended and remodelled with flanking stair towers by Roberts in 1891
