= New Siloh Congregational Chapel =

Coordinates: 51.6441°N 3.9424°W

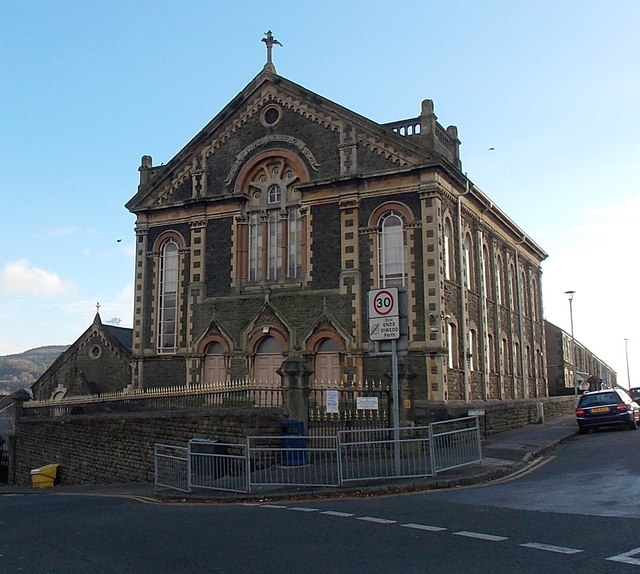
New Siloh Chapel

The New Siloh Congregational Chapel, also known as the Siloh Welsh Independent Chapel or simply the New Siloh Chapel, is a Grade II* listed chapel building at the top of Siloh Hill in Landore, Swansea, Wales. The prefix 'New' distinguishes it from the nearby Old Siloh Chapel, built in 1829.

The New Siloh Chapel was designed by Thomas Freeman, who had previously worked with the chapel's minister-architect, Reverend Thomas Thomas. It opened in 1878. Together with its gallery level (which circles around the entire perimeter of the interior) it could seat 1100 people. Above the congregation was an elaborate ribbed, elliptical ceiling. There was also a large, polygonal pulpit and a church organ with exposed, decorated pipes, installed in 1926.

The exterior frontage has three bays, separated by pediments and decorated with acanthus capitals and parchment scrolls.

It became Grade II* listed in 1987, because of its "strong exterior presence and particularly fine and unspoilt interior".

After the congregation had reduced to only six people, the chapel finally closed with a farewell service in early January 2016.

In 2017, the chapel was handed over to a new congregation called Liberty Church, part of Assemblies of God, who have begun renovation work and continue to meet in the chapel today.

The chapel was featured on the BBC's Songs of Praise on 9 May 2021.
