= Evan Herber Evans =

British minister (1836–1896)

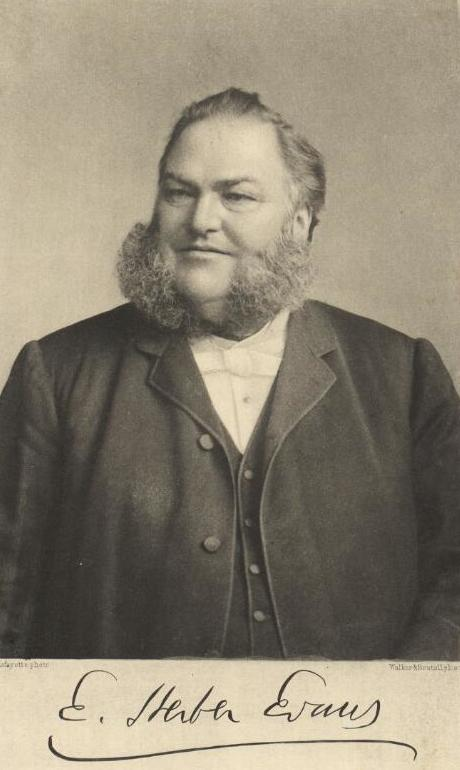
- Born: 5 July 1826; Pant-yr-onen, Carmarthenshire, Wales
- Died: 30 December 1896 (aged 70); Bangor, Caernarfonshire, Wales
- Occupation: Nonconformist minister

Evan Herber Evans (5 July 1836 – 30 December 1896), was a Welsh Nonconformist minister.

== Early life ==
He was the eldest son of Josiah and Sarah Evans of Pant-yr-onen, near Newcastle Emlyn, Carmarthenshire, where he was born on 5 July 1836. As a boy he witnessed something of the "Rebecca Riots", and went to school at the neighbouring village of Llechryd.

He spent several of his earlier years with his grandfather, Jonah Evans, at Pen-yr-Herber, whence, some twenty years later, he adopted his second name. When fourteen years of age, young Evan was apprenticed to a local draper, who was known as a man of literary tastes, and after four years' service in Pontypridd and then at Merthyr, he removed to Liverpool, where in 1857 he commenced to preach in connection with the Welsh congregational church (the Tabernacle), Great Crosshall Street, then under the pastorate of John Thomas (1821–1892).

== Preacher and lecturer ==
After twelve months' preparatory training at the Normal College, Swansea, he proceeded in September 1858 to the Memorial College, Brecon, where he remained for four years. He was ordained to the pastorate of Libanus Church, Morriston, on 26 June 1862, and almost immediately he stepped into the first rank of the pulpit orators of Wales. After three years at Morriston (during which time a debt of £2,000 was paid off the chapel) he removed in the autumn of 1865 to Carnarvon to undertake the charge of a comparatively weak church, Salem, formed two or three years previously, and still burdened with a heavy debt. Before he left it, in April 1894, it was, in point of members, the largest belonging to the denomination in North Wales, the chapel having been much enlarged in 1890. In 1891–2, he filled the chair of the congregational union of England and Wales, and his first presidential address, on "The Free Churches and their own Opportunities," was described by Dr. Andrw Fairbairn as "magnificent", while his second address, delivered at Bradford, on "A Living Church", was by special vote of the assembly ordered to be printed in a cheap form for general circulation. In 1891, he accepted the appointment as lecturer on homiletics at Bala-Bangor Theological Seminary, and in 1894 became its principal.

== Civic and literary work ==
Throughout his life, Evans took an active part in civic work; he was elected on the first school board at Carnarvon, and on the first county council. He declined, however, to stand as liberal candidate for Carnarvon boroughs in April 1890. In 1895, he was placed on the commission of the peace for Carnarvonshire, an honour never previously conferred (it is believed) on a Welsh dissenting minister.

Evans performed some useful literary work as editor of "Y Dysgedydd" ("The Instructor"), one of the monthly magazines of the Welsh congregationalists. From 1874 to 1880, he shared its editorship with Ap Vychan, but had sole charge of it from 1880 till his death. A selection of his editorial "notes" which were remarkable for their freshness and racy quality, was issued shortly after his death by his son-in-law, under the title of "Nodiadau Herber" (Dolgelly, 1897, 8vo, with portrait). His brother, the Rev. W. Justin Evans, also edited a volume of his sermons (London, 1897), entitled "True and False Aims and other Sermons", including inter alia reprints of his two addresses from the chair of the congregational union. He had just completed, before his final illness, a chapter which he was contributing for a biography of Dr. John Thomas of Liverpool, and a short life of David Rees of Llanelly, which appeared posthumously.

But it is as a preacher that Dr. Evans was chiefly celebrated. Indeed, he was probably unequalled for natural unaffected eloquence among the pulpit orators of Wales during the last half-century. In his delivery there was no apparent effort, and attractive personality added greatly to the effect. But his sermons were characterised by freshness of presentment rather than originality of idea, being practical rather than doctrinal. Probably no Welsh pastor ever appeared so often in English pulpits, and he was immensely popular with English audiences.

Evans died on 30 December 1896 at Bangor, and was buried there on 4 January in the Glan-adda cemetery.

== Family ==
In 1865, he married Jenny, the only daughter of John Hughes, the jeweller of Carnarvon. She died on 10 May 1875, leaving behind an only child, who married Rev. O.L. Roberts of Liverpool.

In 1877, he married the only daughter of Owen Jones (from Waterloo House, Carnarvon), who survived him. His only child by her died in infancy.

== Sources ==
- Lewis, Howell Elvet, The Life of E. Herber Evans, D.D. From His Letters, Journals, Etc, London, 1900
