= Tabernacle Chapel, Llanelli =

Church in Carmarthenshire, Wales

Coordinates: 51.6824°N 4.1637°W

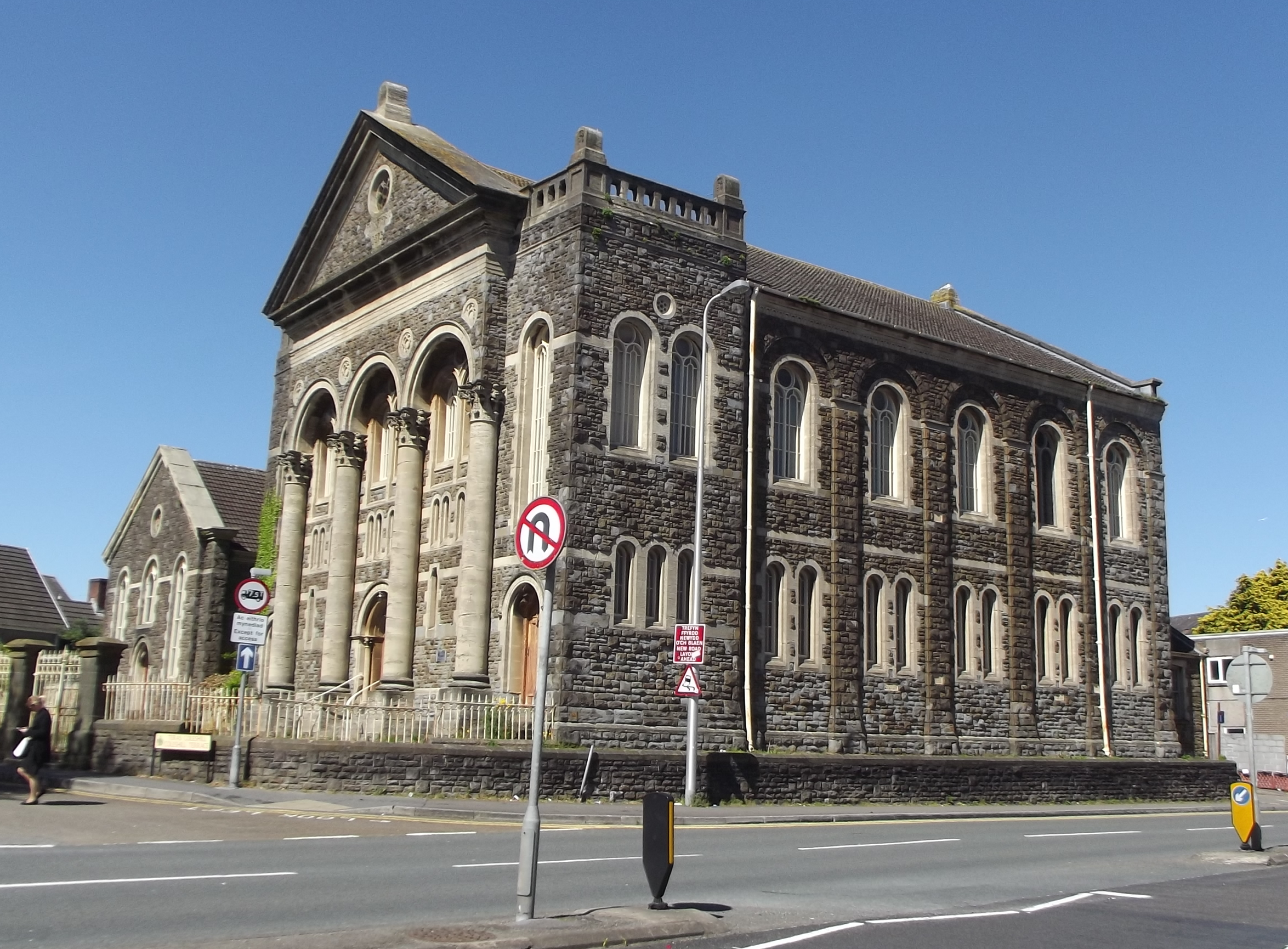
- Tabernacle Chapel, Llanelli
- Location: 17 Cowell Street, Llanelli
- Country: Wales
- Denomination: Independent

History
- Founded: 1872

Architecture
- Heritage designation: Grade II*
- Designated: 3 December 1992
- Architectural type: Chapel

Tabernacle Chapel is an Independent (Congregational) chapel in the town of Llanelli, Carmarthenshire, Wales. It was built in 1872 and is located at 17 Cowell Street. It is a Grade II* listed building.

Tabernacle Chapel was erected at a time when Llanelli had become a significant regional producer of tinplate and steel; the population was growing strongly and needed more buildings in which to worship. It was designed by John Humphrey and was similar to the chapels he designed in Llanidloes and Morriston. The façade is temple-like and combines an arcade with a portico, underneath which is an unusual arrangement of windows and stone-banding. The façade's style is a combination of Roman, Romanesque, Gothic, Italianate and Greek. Inside the chapel, the plaster roof has curved ribbing and there is a curved gallery with a pierced semi-barrier above a low veneered-walnut wall. The pulpit is much-arched and covered in fine fretwork; behind it is an organ gallery, installed in 1901 by Vowles.

The chapel was designated a Grade II* listed building on 3 December 1992, the reason for listing being that it is "a fine example of John Humphreys' distinctive style in chapel building, and probably the most elaborate chapel in Llanelli". The listing includes the spearhead railings with twisted uprights on Cowell Street and the two sets of iron gates. The Royal Commission on the Ancient and Historical Monuments of Wales curates the archaeological, architectural and historic records for this chapel. These include numerous digital photographs and a collection of colour slides.

== Early history ==
Tabernacle was established as a result of a decision by the members of Capel Als to establish a new church because their own chapel could not accommodate all those who wished to attend services. The minister, Thomas Johns, noted that a large number of members lived in the western part of the town and it was therefore decided to establish a new church closer to their homes. The foundation stone was laid on Good Friday 1873 on land donated by Sir John Stepney MP. The chapel opened on Easter Sunday two years later, when Thomas Johns preached the first sermon in the new chapel. By the end of the year, Tabernacle had 502 members.

John Ossian Davies became minister in 1876 and remained for four years before moving to Swansea. Huw Edwards speculates about the reasons for his early departure.

== Divisions ==
He was succeeded by J. Pandy Williams whose ministry at Llanelli was overshadowed by denominational disputes, including a dispute at Bala Theological College which ultimately led to the dismissal of Michael D. Jones as principal of that college. During this period both Ebenezer and Lloyd Street chapels were established as a result of divisions at Tabernacle The next minister, Wynne Evans, remained for ten years before accepting a call to a church in Chester. Following his predecessor's turbulent pastorate, Evans's ministry was described as a peaceful decade in the life of the church. A local newspaper commented that three successive ministers had left Tabernacle for English-language churches.

== The ministry of Gwylfa Roberts ==
Gwylfa Roberts, a renowned poet, became minister in 1899 and remained until his death in 1935. In 1914, as was often the case with Welsh nonconformist ministers, he was awarded an honorary doctorate by an American university, in his case the University of Washington, "for services to Welsh literature".

Gwylfa was a friend and close associate of wartime Prime Minister David Lloyd George and supported the war effort enthusiastically. 142 members from Tabernacle served in the Great War and sixteen lost their lives, including a young nurse. After the armistice, the church commissioned a new stained glass window in memory of the war dead. This was unveiled on Saturday, 26 March 1920 by senior member, Evan Jones of Plas Trimsaran. Specially commissioned medals were also presented to a 120 members returning from active service.

In 1929, the annual meeting of the Union of Welsh Independents was held in Llanelli and Gwylfa Roberts chaired the executive committee. 700 delegates visited the town, representing 1,166 Congregational (or Independent) churches. This was the highlight of Gwylfa's long ministry at Tabernacle.

== The ministry of Gwyndaf Evans ==
E. Gwyndaf Evans, minister from 1935 until 1957 was a leading figure in Welsh life and later became Archdruid. He was chosen as Gwylfa's successor while still a theological student at Aberystwyth although he had already achieved national prominence as the chaired bard at the 1935 National Eisteddfod at Caernarfon. His ministry commenced on 13 March 1938 and the Second World War erupted soon after. In contrast to his predecessor, Gwyndaf was an uncompromising pacifist and his views antagonised a section of the membership including some of the deacons.

During his ministry, Gwyndaf also came into conflict with the chapel organist, Idris Griffiths, who was a talented and well-regarded musician. Gwyndaf was less than enthusiastic about the musical concerts being held at Tabernacle, believing them to be unsuitable for a place of worship. The clash eventually led to Griffiths leaving Tabernacle in 1948 and joining the congregation at Lloyd Street.

== Later history ==
The last ministers were Richard Gwynedd Jones (1958–70), Emrys Ebenezer (1977-83), Raymond Williams (1987-2003) and Huw R. Thomas (2003–05) who died suddenly at the age of 56.

== See also ==
- John Ossian Davies, minister of the Tabernacle from 1876 to 1880

== Sources ==
- Edwards, Huw (2009). Capeli Llanelli. Our Rich Heritage. Carmarthenshire County Council. ISBN 978-0-906821-77-0.
