= David Rowlands (Dewi Môn) =

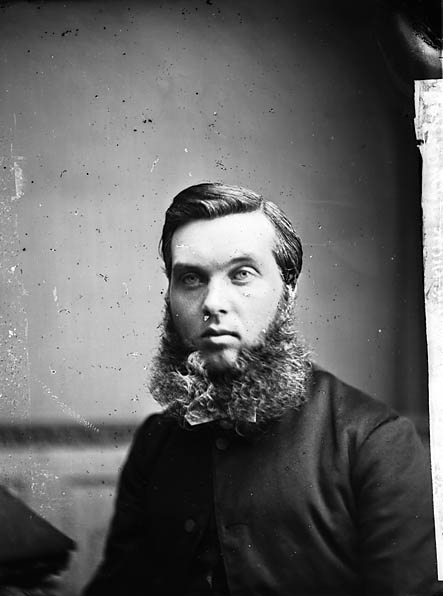
David Rowlands (Dewi Môn)

David Rowlands (Dewi Môn) (4 March 1836 – 7 January 1907) was a Welsh Congregational minister, college head and poet.

== Life ==
The son of John and Margaret Rowlands, he was born on 4 March 1836 at Geufron, Rhosybol, Anglesey. Two years later, his father moved to the farm at Ty Cristion, Bodedern. After a village education he was apprenticed at thirteen, and spent some time in shops at Holyhead and Hatfield.

Encouraged by the Rev. W. Griffith of Holyhead, Rowlands became an independent preacher, and in 1853 entered Bala Congregational College. He went on in 1856 to New College, London; he returned to Bala in 1857 for a year as assistant-tutor, and in 1858 became a member of the Brecon Congregational College, graduating B.A. at London University in 1860. His first pastorate was at Llanbrynmair (1861–6); he was then for four years (1866–70) minister of the English church at Welshpool, and for two (1870–2) of the English church at Carmarthen. From 1872 to 1897 he was one of the tutors of Brecon College, and from 1897 head of the institution.

In 1902 Rowlands was chairman of the Congregational Union of Wales. He took part in Breconshire politics and was a member of the committee which drafted the county scheme of intermediate education. He was a prominent figure in Welsh literary and political life, but in poor health in his later years. He died at Brecon on 7 January 1907.

== Works ==
Rowlands, whose bardic name was "Dewi Môn", was a writer of Welsh and English verse. His major works were:

- Caniadau Serch (Welsh lyrics), Bala, 1855, published when he was 19.
- Sermons on Historical Subjects, London, 1870.
- Grammadeg Cymraeg, Wrexham, 1877, a short Welsh grammar.
- Gwersi mewn Grammadeg, Dolgelly, 1882, a manual of lessons in grammar.
- A Welsh version of the Alcestis of Euripides, 1887, in competition at the Aberdare eisteddfod of 1885; it shared the prize with another version and both were printed in one volume.
- Telyn Tudno, Wrexham, 1897, containing the life and works of his brother-in-law, the poet Tudno (Thomas Tudno Jones).

Rowlands worked with the composer Joseph Parry, and supplied English words for his opera Blodwen and the oratorios Emmanuel and Joseph; he was also literary editor of Parry's Cambrian Minstrelsie (Edinburgh, 1893). He was one of the four editors of the hymns in Y Caniedydd Cynulleidfaol (London, 1895), the hymn and tune book of the Welsh congregationalists.

== Family ==
Rowlands married:

1. in 1864, Mary Elizabeth, daughter of William Roberts of Liverpool, by whom he left a son, Wilfred;
2. in 1897, Alice, step-daughter of J. Prothero, of Brecon.
