= John Ossian Davies =

Welsh Congregationalist minister (1851–1916)

John Ossian Davies (10 November 1851 – 24 September 1916) was a Welsh Congregationalist minister. Born in Cardigan, he began his career as a printer and journalist and was editor of Y Fellten, a newspaper produced in Merthyr Tydfil. Whilst in Merthyr he began to preach and in 1873 he began studies at the Memorial College in Brecon. In 1876 he accepted the position of minister of the Tabernacle, Llanelli, later relocating to Herbert Place, Swansea (1880), to Tollington Park, London (1883), to Bournemouth (1888) and back to London as minister of Paddington Chapel (1897), before retiring in 1903.

His written works include a number of sermons published in Old Yet Ever New (1904) and Dayspring From On High (1907).

He died in Shortlands, Kent, in September 1916.
