= Brecon Congregational Memorial College =

Congregational college in Brecon, Powys, Wales

Coordinates: 51.9431°N 3.3761°W

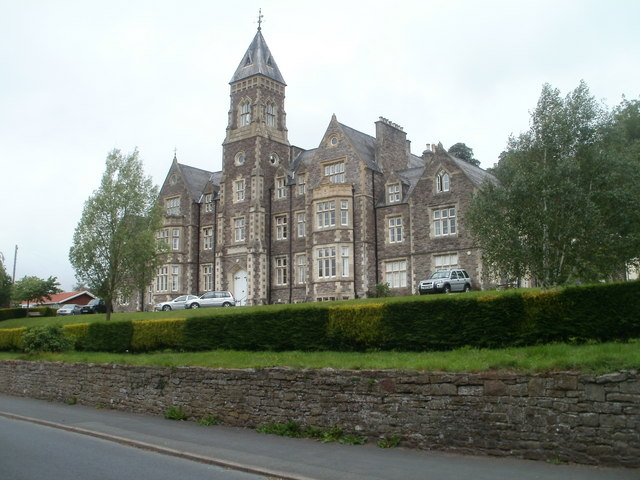
Brecon Congregational Memorial College

Brecon Congregational Memorial College was a Congregational college in Brecon, Powys, Mid Wales. The college graduated ministers and missionaries who were posted to Africa and India. There were classes in biblical literature, chemistry, classical languages, logic, psychology, theism, theology, trigonometry, German language, and Welsh language. The college was established in Carmarthen in 1757, and was located in Brecon from 1839. The Memorial College building in Brecon was opened in 1869. After the last principal left in 1959, the college was closed. The building is now named Camden Court and is used for sheltered housing.

== History ==
The college originated as the Congregational Academy which in 1757 separated from the Independent Academy in Carmarthen. In its early years, the Congregational Academy was based in several towns in Wales: in Abergavenny, Oswestry, Wrexham, Llanfyllin and Newtown, before finally settling in Brecon. From 1839 to 1869, the college was based in St Mary's Street, Brecon.

The Memorial College on Camden Road was opened on 15 and 16 September 1869. The building belonged to the Independents, and its construction was designed to perpetuate the memory of the 2,000 clergy ejected from the Church of England in 1662. Its historical source is twofold: the first and earliest, the Academy at Brynllywarch, near Bridgend, Glamorganshire, founded by Samuel Jones, A.M. (once a tutor at Jesus College, Oxford), soon after his ejection from the National Church in 1662, the immortal era which the new edifice commemorates; the next and latest source, Tewkesbury Academy, in Gloucestershire, taught by another Samuel Jones, who could, according to William Fitzgerald, the editor of Butler's Analogy, number among his scholars many names that might confer honour on any University in Christendom.

Among these were:

- Jeremiah Jones, a relative of the master's, and an author of a treatise upon the Canon of the New Testament;
- Isaac Maddox, afterwards Bishop of Worcester;
- Lord Bowes, the Chancellor of Ireland;
- Samuel Chandler, the acute apologist of Christianity and intrepid defender of toleration;
- Thomas Secker, afterwards Archbishop of Canterbury;
- Bishop Butler, author of the Analogy of Religion.

These two institutions, according to Dr. Rees, of Swansea were amalgamated into one college at Carmarthen. In consequence of the heterodoxy of one of the tutors, the Congregational Fund Board, which was united with the Presbyterian Board in the support of the college, withdrew its patronage, and established a separate institution at Abergavenny, taking some of the Carmarthen students with it, among whom may be mentioned the Reverend J. Griffiths, of Glandwr. This took place in the year 1755. Since then it has undergone several local changes, having been removed successively from Abergavenny to Oswestry, Wrexham, Llanfyllin, Newtown, and Brecknock.

== The foundation stone of the new college laid in 1867 ==
During its location in Brecknock and up to the year 1869, the college was situate in St. Mary street, in the large building known as the Oddfellows' Hall. On Wednesday, 12 June 1867, the foundation stone of the new building was laid by Samuel Morley, M.P., in the presence of the Mayor and Corporation of Brecknock, and of a large gathering from England and Wales. In the outset, plans of the proposed college were prepared by the Rev. Thomas Thomas, of Landore, who had taken great interest in the affair; but after tenders had been advertised for and received, it was found that the cost for carrying out the plans in their entirety would be considerably more than the committee felt themselves justified in incurring. The design was then reduced, and eventually it was decided to accept the tender of Messrs. Watkins and Jenkins, of Swansea, at £8,250. Towards this amount there was then in hand a sum of about £2,000, the result of the effort made in connection with the Bicentenary movement, after expenditure for various objects. Another noble sum of £1,000 was contributed by Samuel Morley, and a number of smaller sums were given by others interested in the progress of education, and especially in the proper preparation of young men for the work of the ministry. The college altogether cost, inclusive of 4.5 acres (1.8 ha) of freehold land, about £11,000, all of which, with the exception of £900, was raised by the opening days, and the remaining debt was wiped off by the end of the same year. Other expenses were afterwards incurred in connection with the grounds and residences, which brought the entire cost to the sum of £12,000.

== Architecture and fittings ==
The building is of Gothic design, and three stories high. It is built of native stone, with Bath stone dressings. The extreme length in front is 154 feet (47 m), with a depth from front to back of about 100 feet (30 m). There is a centre building, with a wing on either side, and an area between. On the basement floor are all the domestic apartments. On the first floor, there are a dining hall 85 by 20 feet (25.9 m × 6.1 m), and 18.5 feet (5.6 m), with a large bay window; and a handsome library of the same dimensions. These rooms, together with the principal staircase, occupy the principal floor of the main building. The next storey consists of two class-rooms and studies. The third storey contains the dormitories; there are 24 studies and 20 dormitories (some of them with two beds) for the use of the students. There are also convenient residences for the tutors. The tower, which projects 7 feet (2.1 m) from the line of the main building, is 16 square feet (1.5 m^{2}) and about 100 feet (30 m) high. The principal entrance is under the tower, and there is also a very fine principal staircase. In front of the building, there is a broad terrace, also a roadway leading to the back of it.

The building is a grade II listed.

== Grounds ==
The grounds, too, have been laid out and planted after a very neat design; and the roadway from the entrance gates to the college is broad and substantially laid down.

== Notable staff and students ==
- Evan Jones (Ieuan Gwynedd) (1820–1852), independent minister and journalist
- Griffith John (1831–1912) missionary and translator in China
- Evan Herber Evans (1836–1896), nonconformist minister
- David Rowlands (Dewi Môn) (1836–1907), Congregational minister, teacher and poet. A tutor at the college from 1872 to 1897 and its head from 1897
- John Ossian Davies (1851–1916), Congregationalist minister
- J. Vyrnwy Morgan (1860–1925), Congregationalist minister and author
- John James Williams (J.J.) (1869–1954), poet, Archdruid of the National Eisteddfod
- David Miall Edwards (1873–1941), writer and theologian, Professor of the Philosophy of Religion and Christian Doctrine at the college from 1909 to 1934
- Daniel John Davies (1885–1970) Baptist minister and poet
- Pennar Davies (1911–1996), clergyman and author. Professor of Church History at the college from 1950 and principal from 1952
- David Glyn Bowen (1933–2000), Congregationalist minister and missionary

== Bibliography ==
- Barnes, David (2005). The Companion Guide to Wales. Companion Guides. ISBN 978-1-900639-43-9.
- Poole, Edwin (1886). The Illustrated History and Biography of Brecknockshire: From the Earliest Times to the Present Day. Illustrated by Several Engravings and Portraits (Public domain ed.). Edwin Poole.
