= Plough Lane Chapel, Brecon =

Coordinates: 51.9468°N 3.3889°W

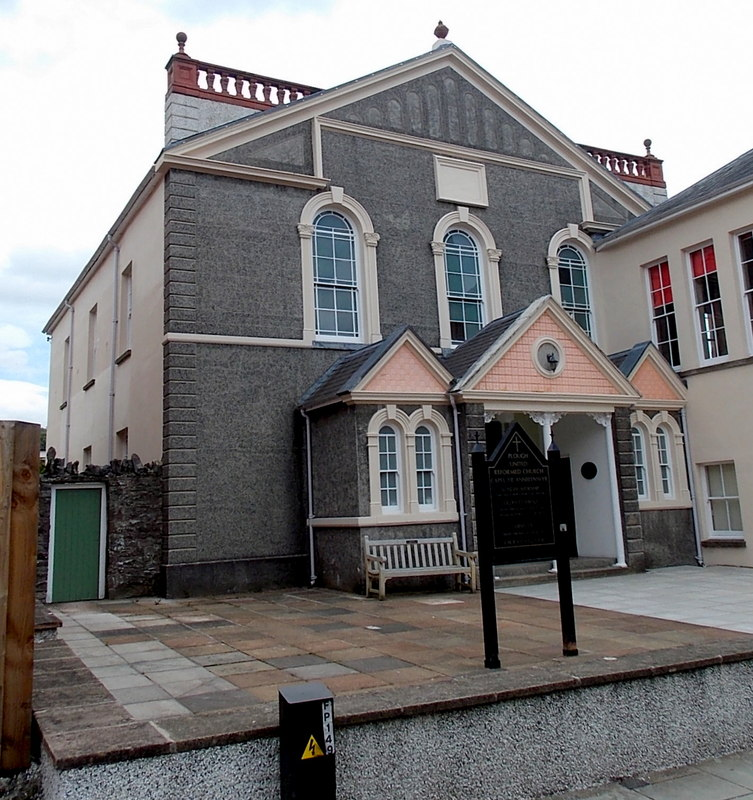
- Plough Lane Chapel, Brecon
- Location: Plough Lane, Brecon
- Country: Wales
- Denomination: Union of Welsh Independents

History
- Founded: 1690s; rebuilt in 19th century

Architecture
- Heritage designation: Grade II*
- Designated: 16 December 1976
- Architect: Owen Morris Roberts
- Completed: 1892

Plough Lane Chapel or Plough United Reformed Church is a historic building in Brecon, Wales. The chapel's foundation dates to the 17th century and the structure was rebuilt in 1841, then again in 1892. Cadw, the historic environment service of the Welsh Government, listed the chapel as a Grade II* historic building in 1976 for its "unusual porch" and "elaborate and fine interior".

The chapel takes its name from a public house called The Plough on whose site the chapel was built in the 1690s. The present building dates back to 1841 and was re-modelled by Owen Morris Roberts in 1892. Particularly notable is the beautiful woodwork of the gallery fronts and pulpit. The vestry contains memorial plaques from the former Glamorgan Street Congregational Church. Off the vestry is also the splendid “Minister’s toilet” with a lavishly decorated toilet pan.

== Gallery ==
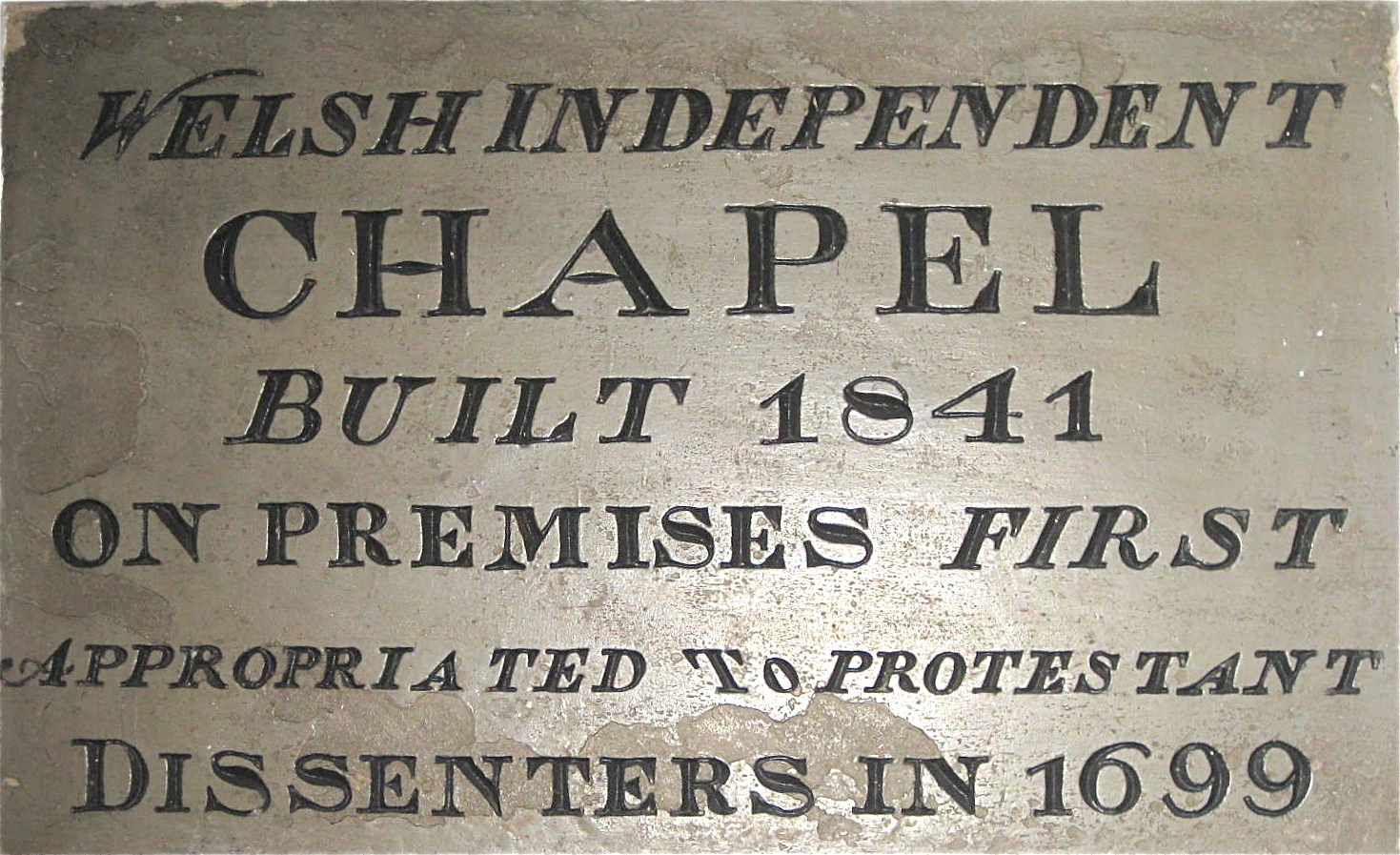
Date plaque, 1841. Plough Lane Chapel, Lion Street, Brecon.

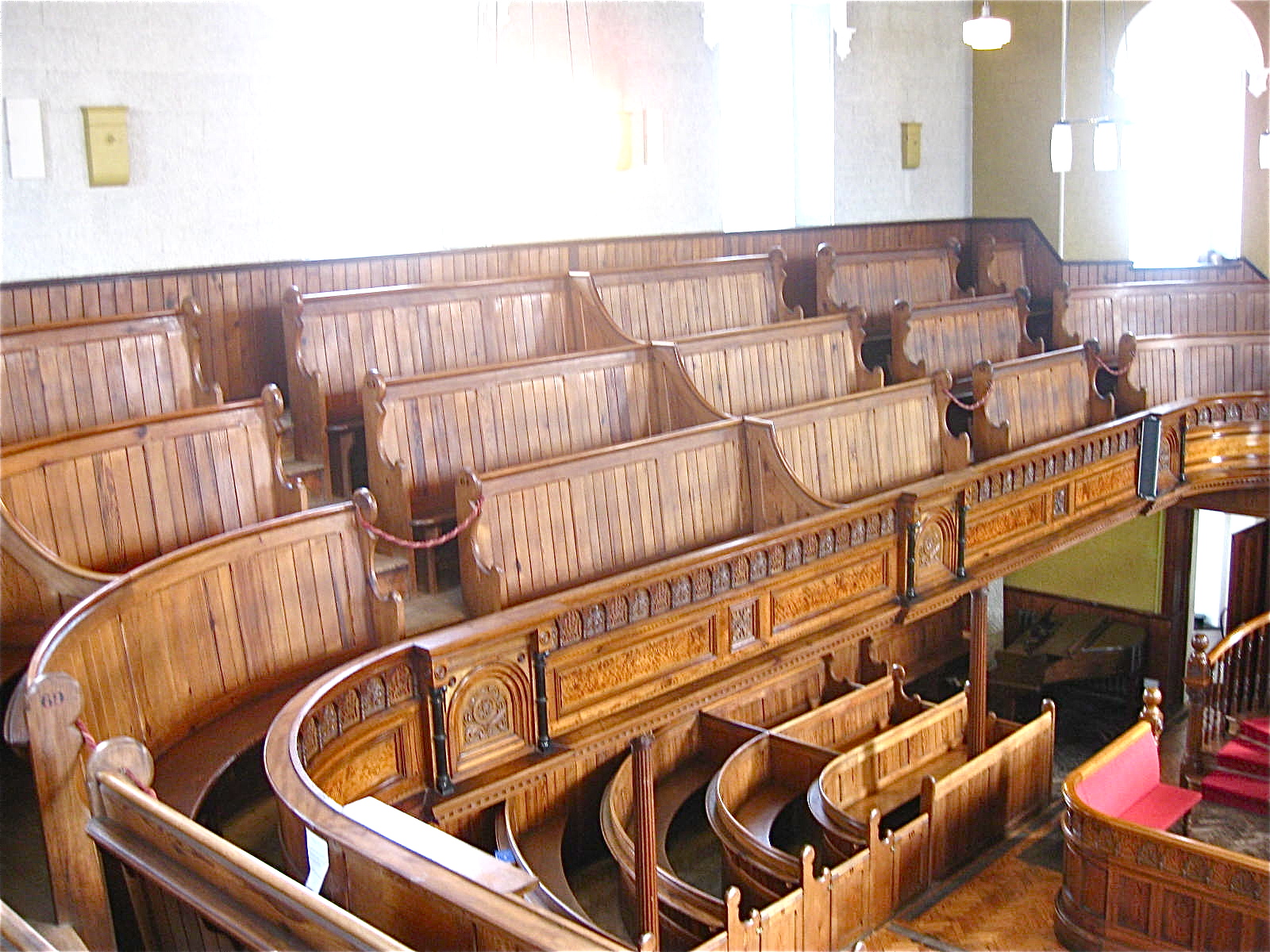
Tiered pews on gallery Plough Lane Chapel, Lion Street, Brecon.

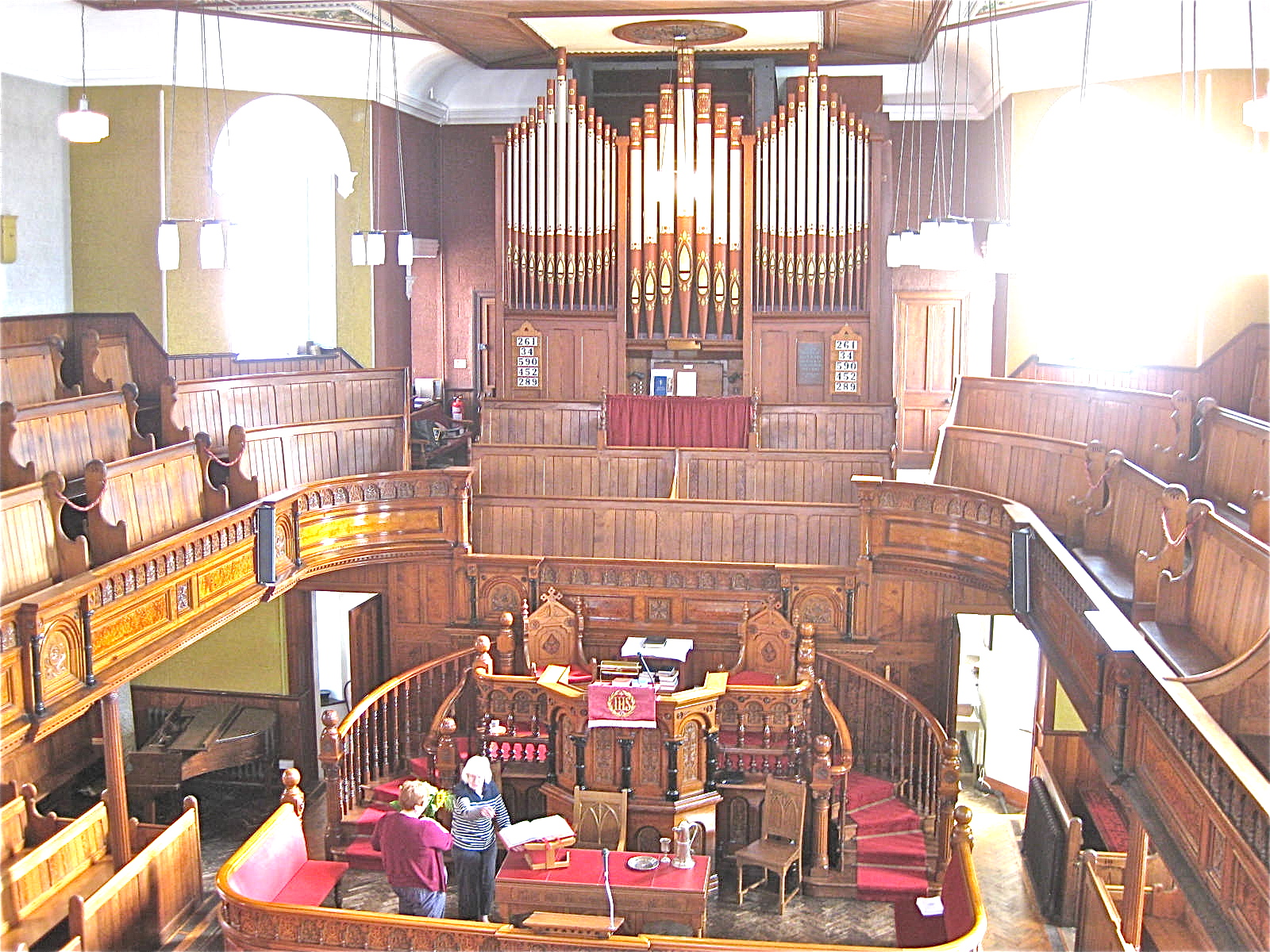
Interior view at Plough Lane Chapel, Lion Street, Brecon looking towards organ.

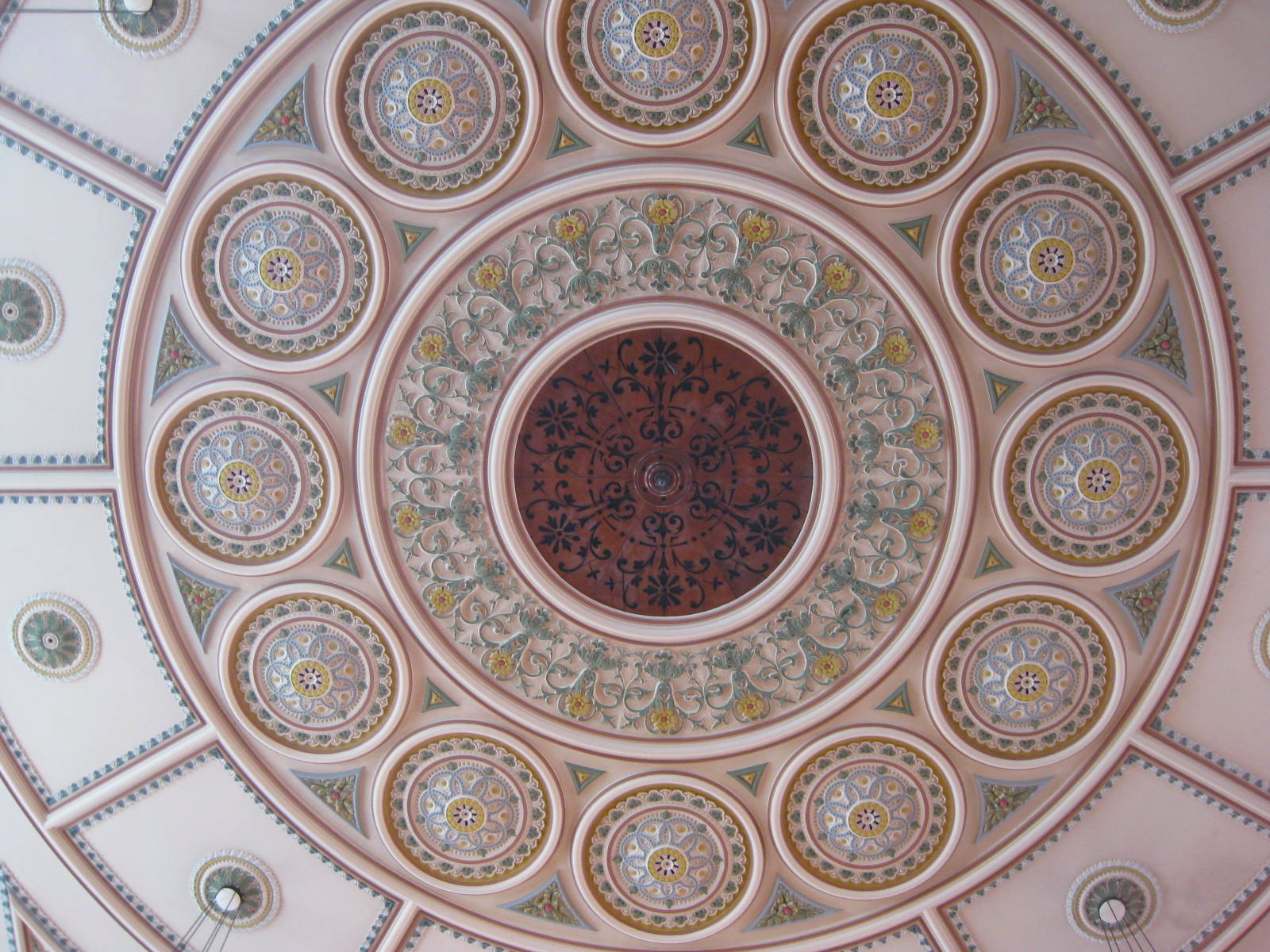
Decorative plaster ceiling c 1880 at Plough Lane Chapel, Lion Street, Brecon.

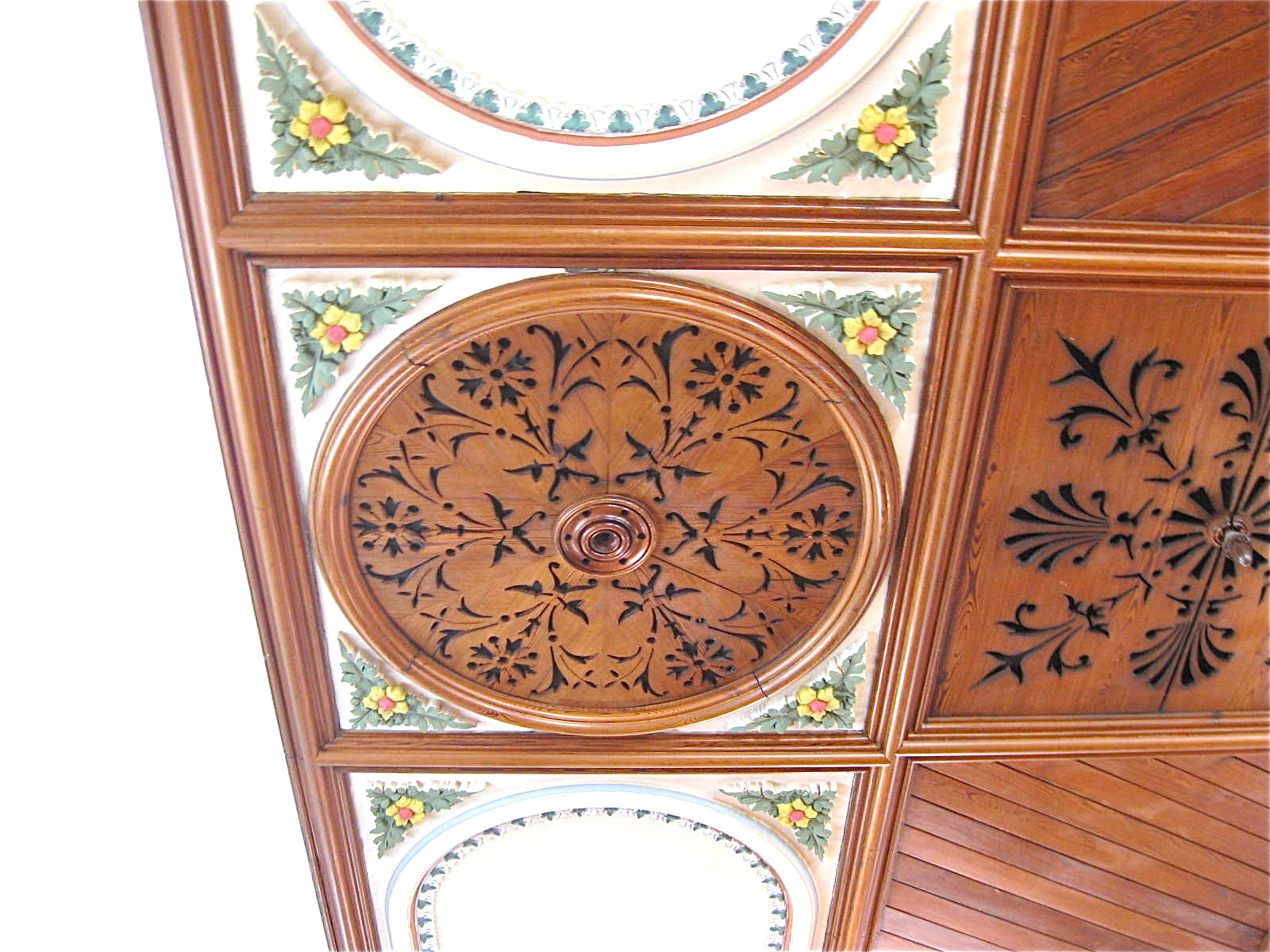
Elaborate Victorian ventilation system c 1880 at Plough Lane Chapel, Lion Street, Brecon.

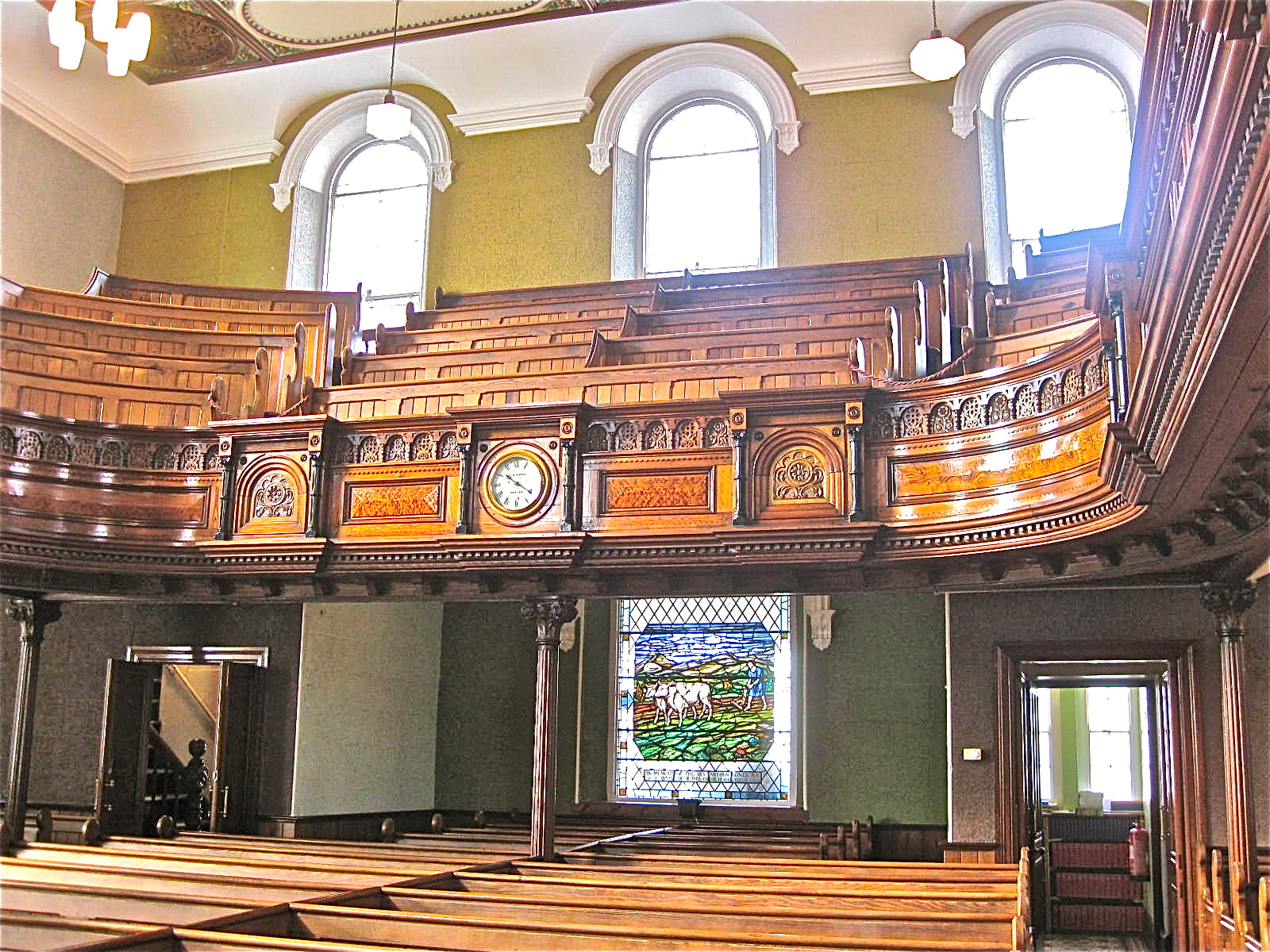
Interior view with decorative woodwork c 1880 at Plough Lane Chapel, Lion Street, Brecon.

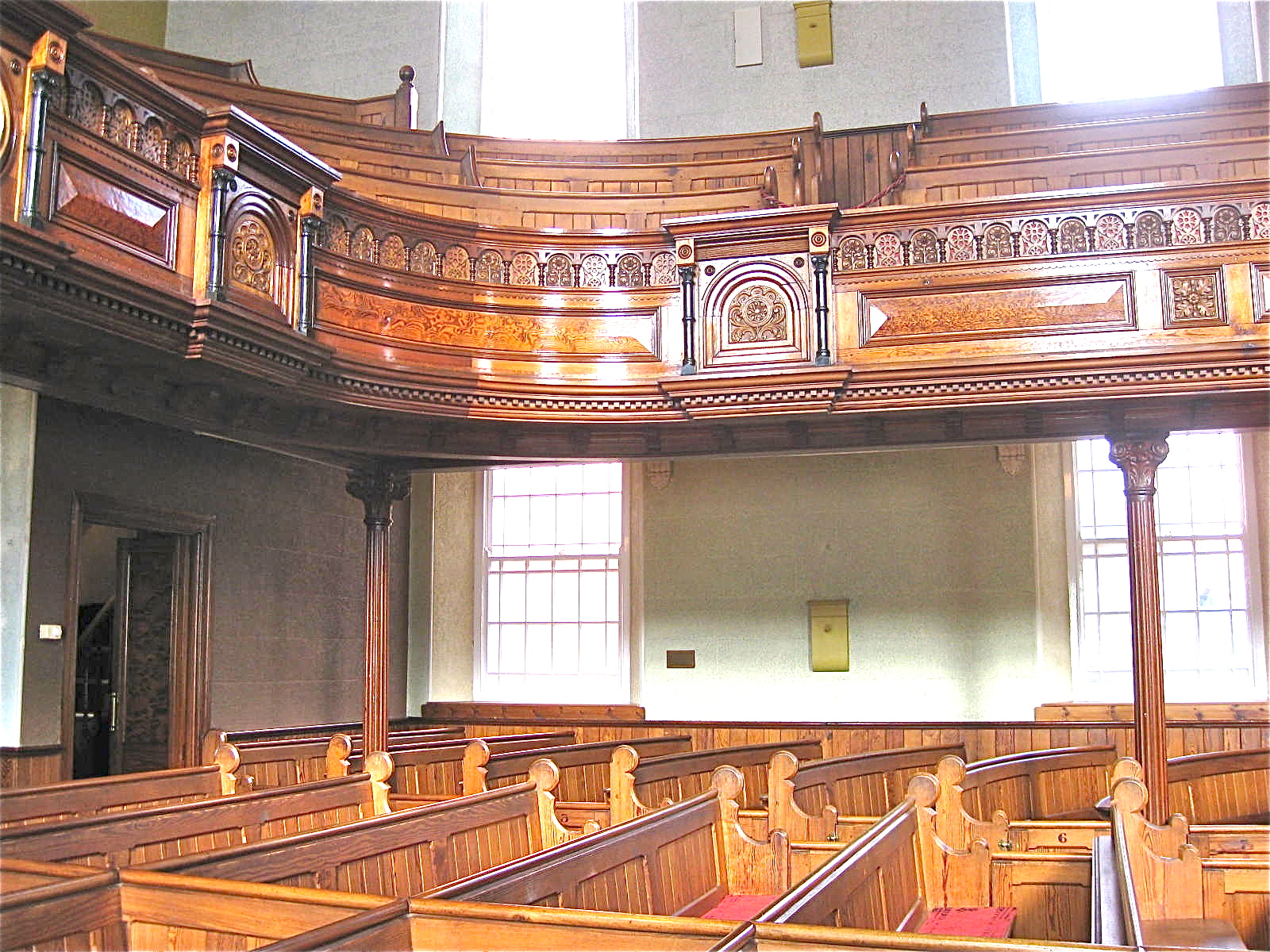
The tiered gallery with decorative woodwork c1880 at Plough Lane Chapel, Lion Street, Brecon.

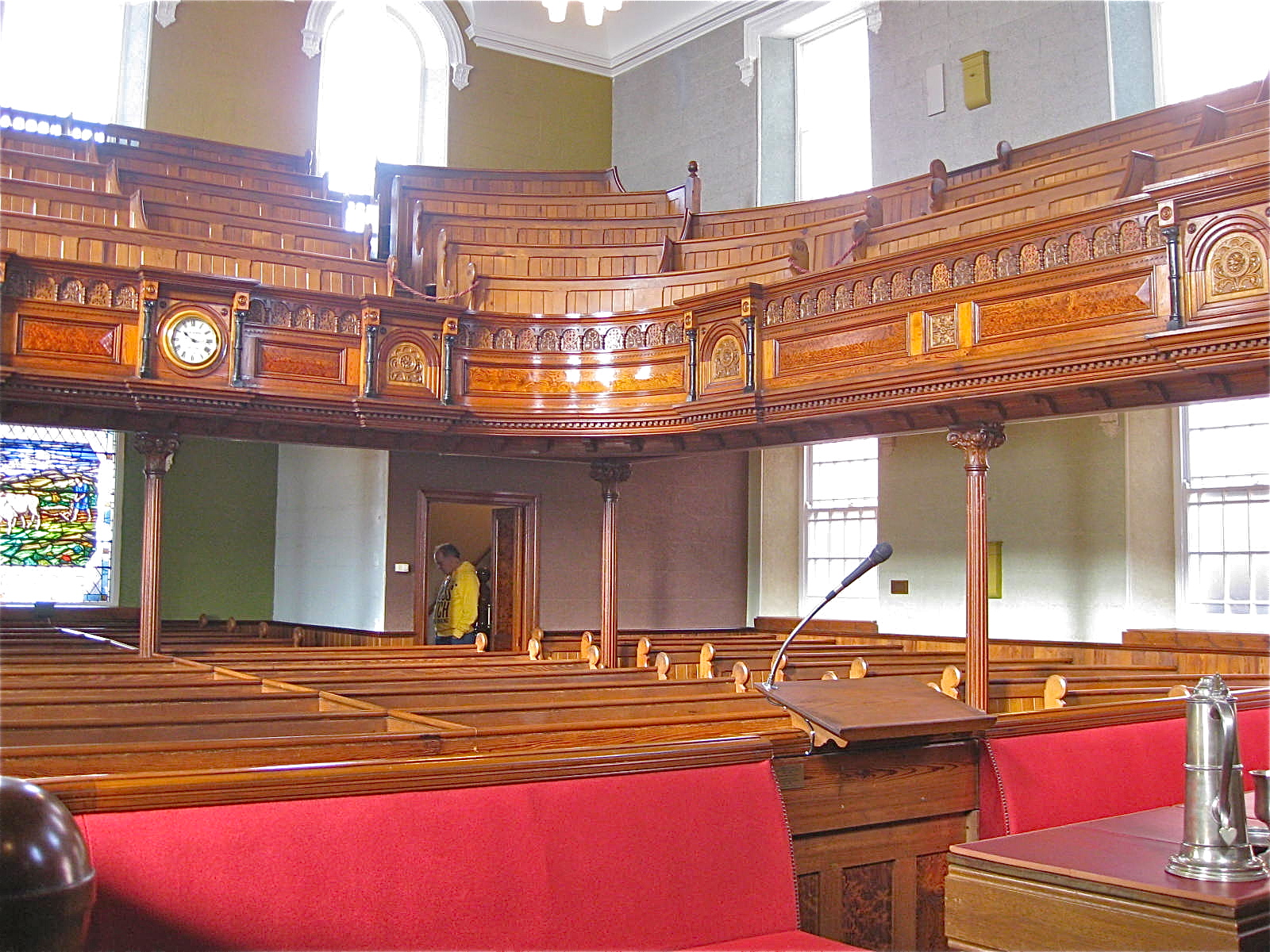
Interior view of the tiered gallery with decorative woodwork c 1880 at Plough Lane Chapel, Lion Street, Brecon.

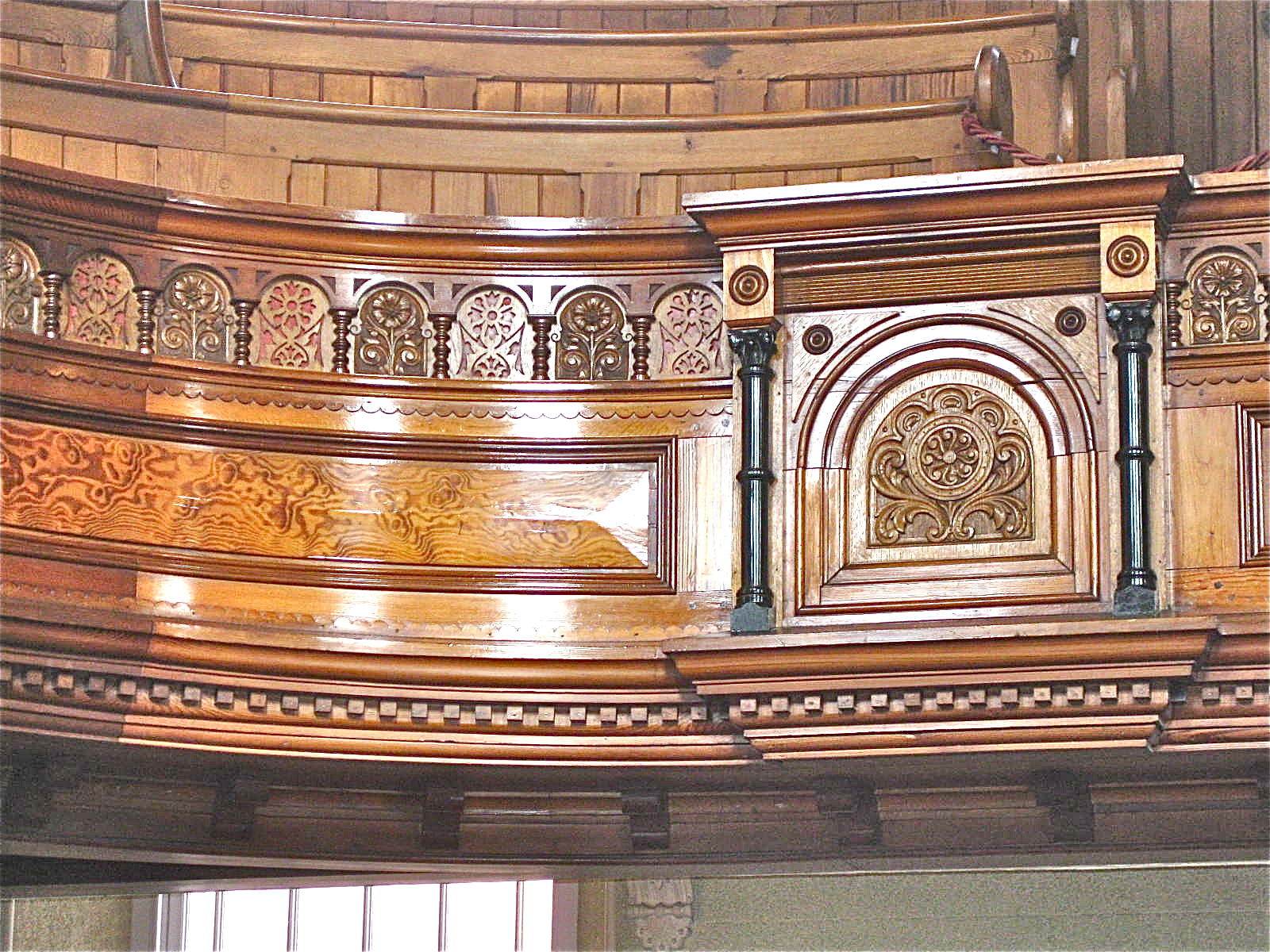
Detailed view of the tiered gallery with decorative woodwork c 1880 at Plough Lane Chapel, Lion Street, Brecon.

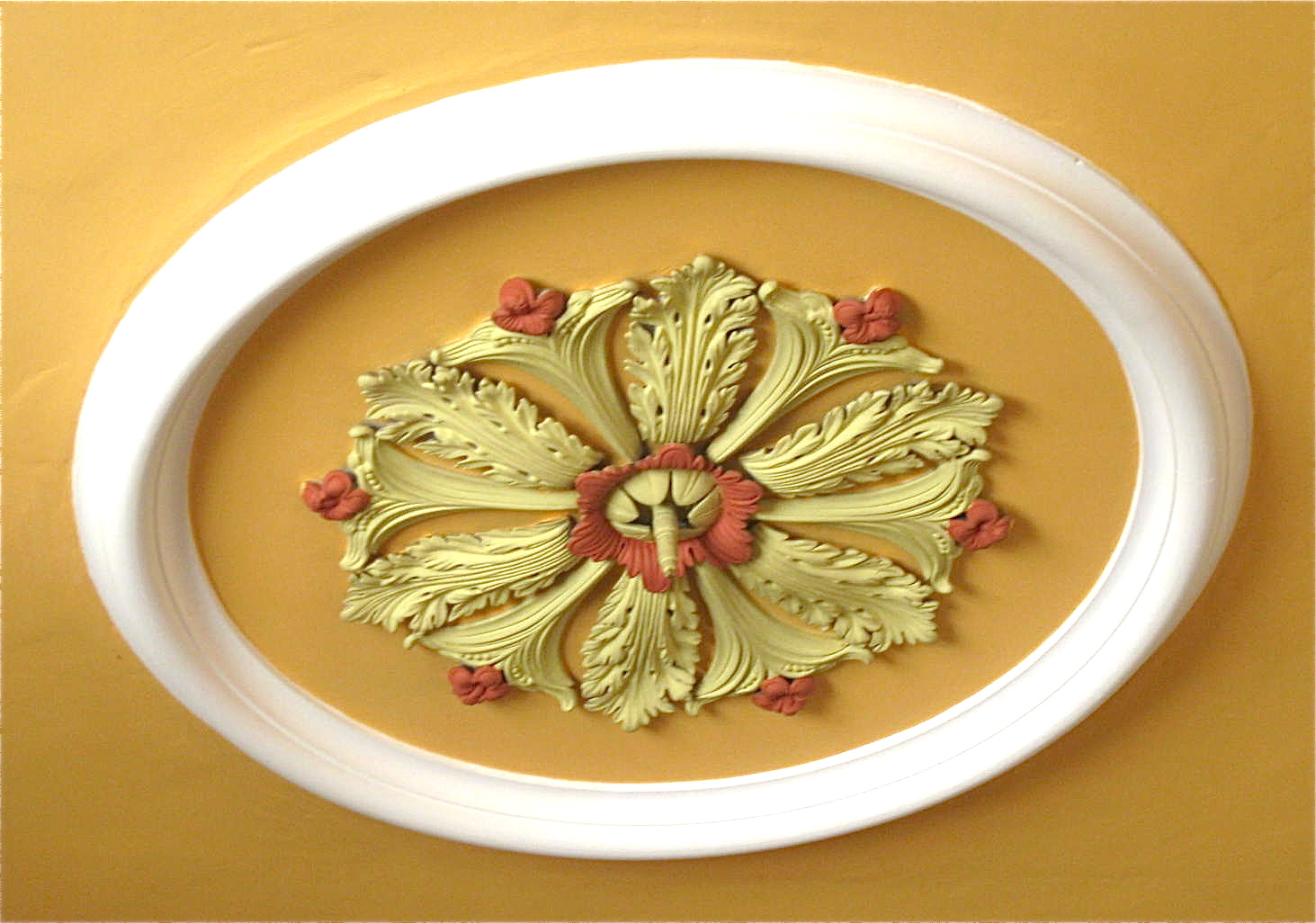
Plasterwork ceiling rose for gas light c 1880 at Plough Lane Chapel, Lion Street, Brecon.

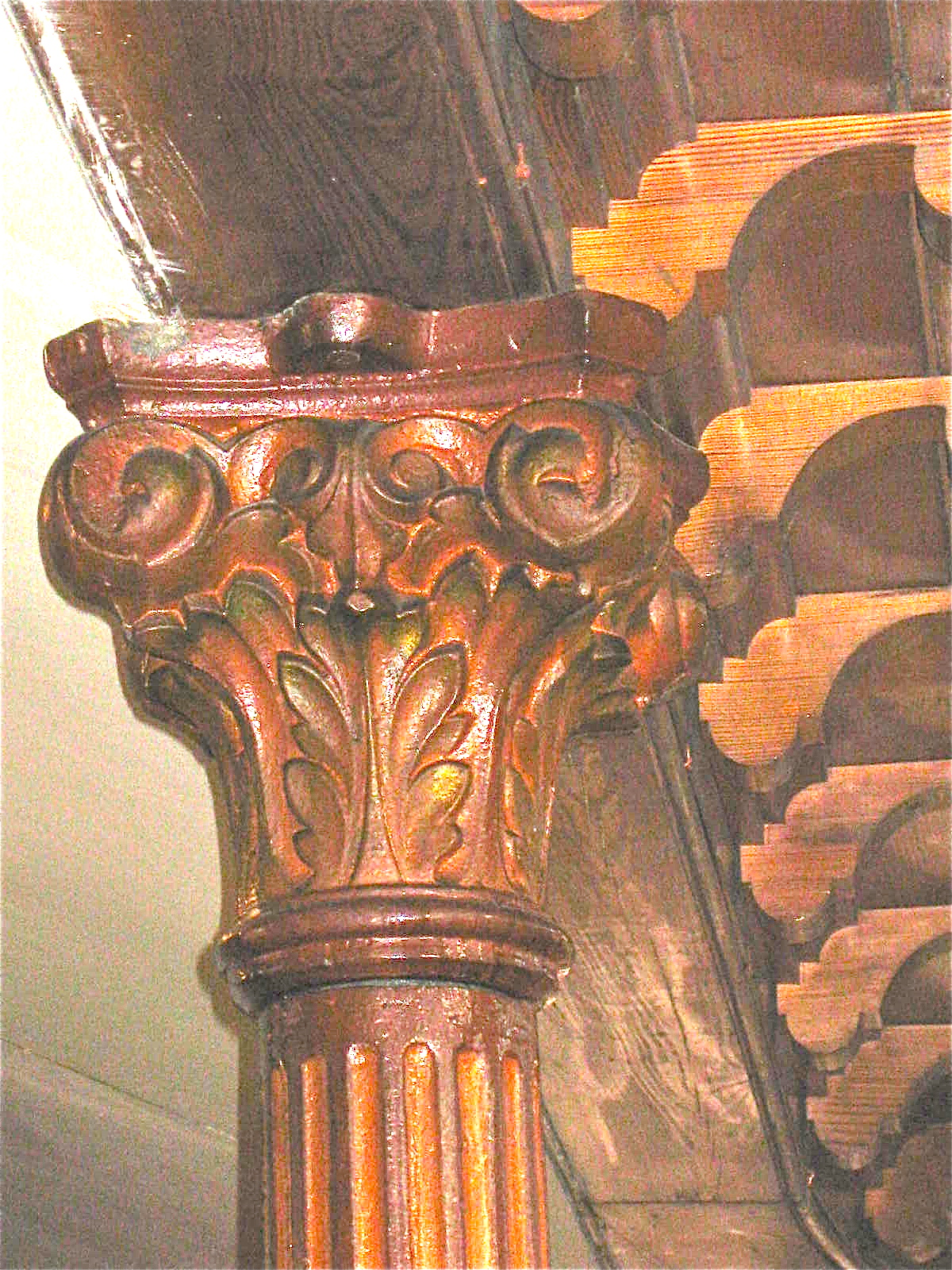
Cast iron Corinthian stanchions used to support the gallery ?1880 at the Plough Lane Chapel, Lion Street, Brecon.

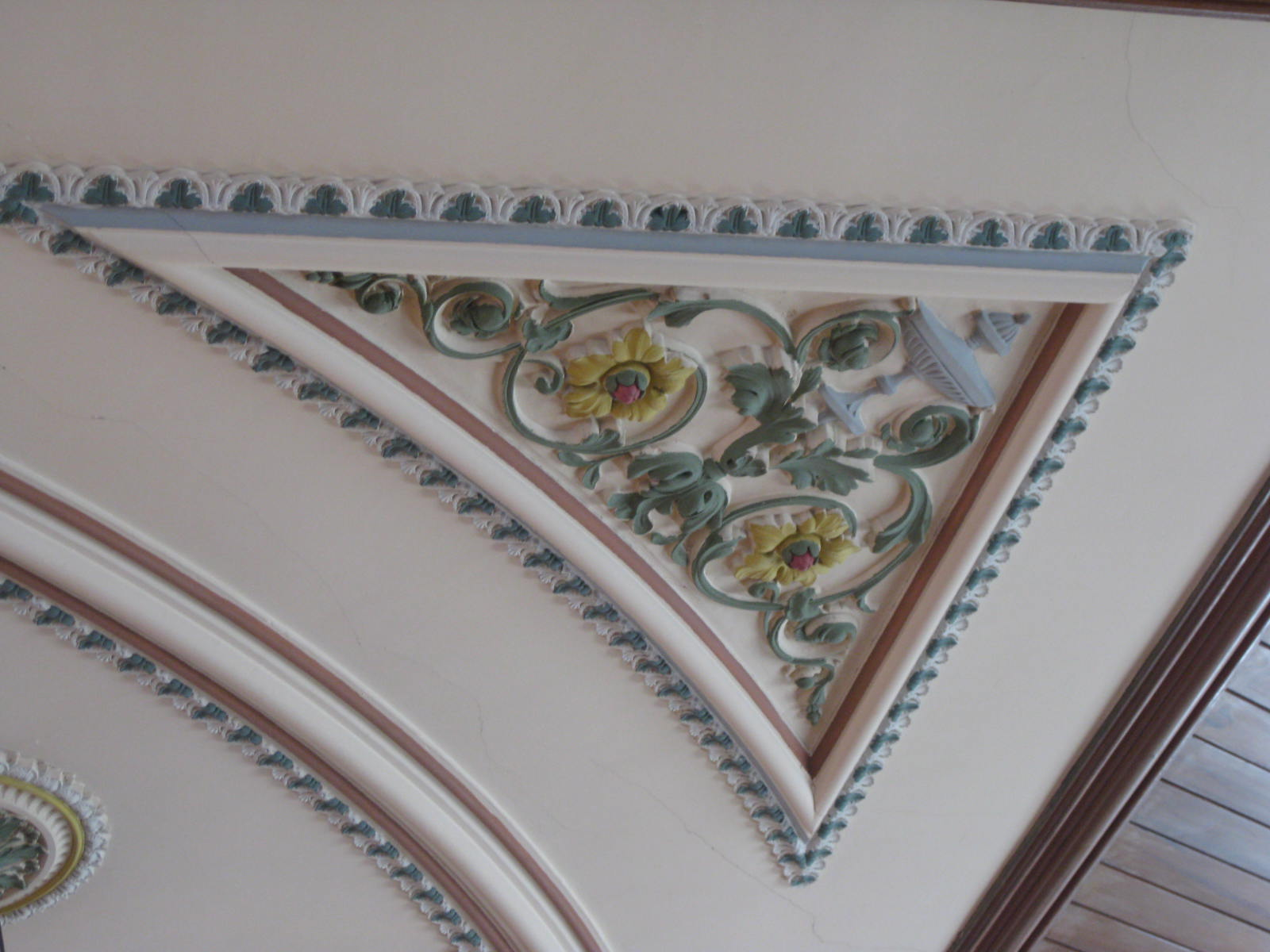
Plasterwork ceiling spandrel c 1880.

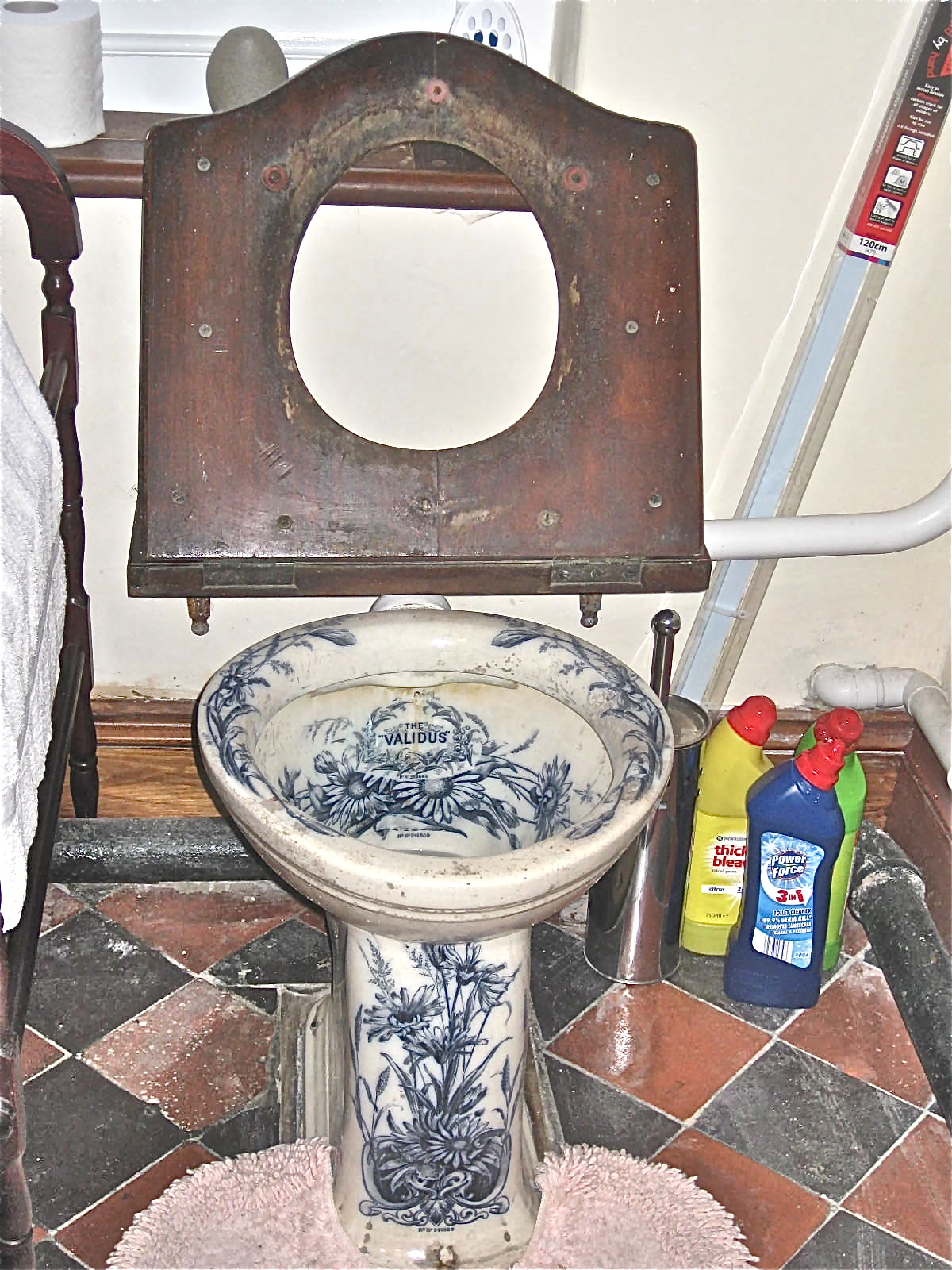
Listed Loo, Plough Chapel, Lion Street, Brecon
