= Owen F. T. Roberts =

Captain Owen Fiennes Temple Roberts FRSE MC (1896–1968) was a British astronomer and meteorologist.

== Life ==
Owen Roberts was born in Mauritius in 1896, and was the son of Alfred Temple Roberts (1857–1911) and his wife Susan Charlotte Catherine Fiennes-Clinton (d.1936).

In the First World War, Owen served with the Royal Garrison Artillery and rose to the rank of captain, winning the Military Cross.

After the war, he completed his studies at Cambridge University, graduating with a M.A. around 1921. He then began lecturing in Astronomy and Meteorology at Aberdeen University.

In 1928, Owen was elected a Fellow of the Royal Society of Edinburgh. His proposers were Hector Munro Macdonald, James Goodwillie, Ralph Allan Sampson and Arthur Crichton Mitchell.

He died in Leicester in 1968.

== Family ==
In 1918 he married Ethel S. Fenner in Cheltenham.

== Publications ==
- The Theoretical Scattering of Smoke in a Turbulent Atmosphere (1923)
- A Note on Measuring the Gradient Wind (1946)
