= Cristion =

Welsh-language Christian magazine

Cristion is a Welsh language Christian magazine. It is published by a committee of multi-denominationional Nonconformist and Anglican churches in Wales. The magazine is published every two months, and contains articles on Christian subjects in Wales, news items, book reviews, letters and competitions. It was established in 1983.

The journal has been digitised by the Welsh Journals Online project at the National Library of Wales.
