= David Rees (Y Cynhyrfwr) =

Welsh Congregationalist minister

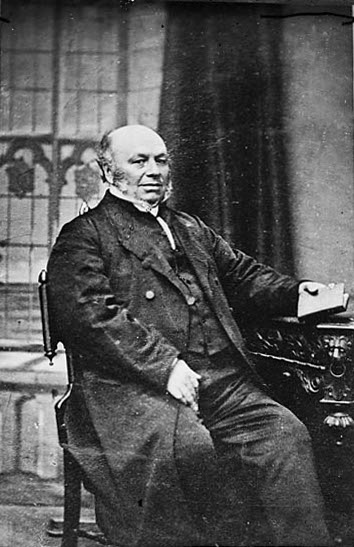
David Rees

The Reverend David Rees (14 November 1801– 31 March 1869) was a Welsh Congregational minister of Capel Als chapel Llanelli, Carmarthenshire, and an editor of a radical Welsh language Nonconformist periodical titled Y Diwygiwr (The Reformer). Known as 'Y Cynhyrfwr' ('The Agitator'), he held radical political views and opposed the relationship between the Established Church and the state.

== Early life ==
Rees, son of Bernard and Anna Rees, was born and raised on the Gelli Lwyd farm in the parish of Trelech, Carmarthenshire. Whilst a child he worked on his family's farm as well as spending some time with the local blacksmith, as an apprentice.

Rees did not have any formal education as a child but was instructed at the Sunday school and participated in Christian worship regularly at home with his family.

In 1818 he became a member of Tre-lech Congregationalist church under the ministry of the Calvinistic minister Morgan Jones, and in 1822 with the aim of becoming a preacher, he enlisted as a student in a school in Haverfordwest, Pembrokeshire and later studied for a time at Carmarthen Grammar School.

Rees started preaching in 1823 at the age of 22 and after spending some time at a school in Newtown, Montgomeryshire, in 1825 he joined the Congregationalist academy, also in Newtown. Rees studied at the academy for four years and became familiar with some of the most notable Welsh Congregationalists of his time. One of these was the young Samuel Roberts, Llanbrynmair (S.R.) who was later to become a Congregational minister and editor of another radical Welsh publication Cronicl y Cymdeithasau Crefyddol ("Chronicle of Religious Societies").

== Personal life ==
Rees married Sarah Roberts, the daughter of a successful shop owner who was a deacon with the Baptists, in 1832 and they had five children: Bernard, Elizabeth, John Calvin, Luther and Frederick. The last two drowned in a tragic accident when they were in their early teens. His wife Sarah also died in 1857, and Rees remarried in 1858, to Mrs Phillips, a widow from Carmarthen.

== Ministry ==
After spending four years at the academy in Newtown, Rees accepted a call to be the minister of Capel Als in 1829 and remained there until his death in 1869. Shortly before he began his ministry, Rees purchased the freehold of the Capel Als site, together with the adjoining cemetery, from local industrialist Richard Pemberton. The sum paid was £65.

As well as leading many campaigns to renovate and enlarge the chapel, Rees also had a big influence in establishing four other Congregationalist churches in the vicinity: Park English Chapel, Capel y Bryn, Capel y Doc and Siloa, Llanelli.

At the start of Rees' ministry it is said that Capel Als had around 250 members. This number increased to 589 by 1850 even though many members had left to form the churches mentioned above.

By Rees' own account in the 1851 Religious Census, the chapel was nearly always full for the Sunday night service, with the numbers present calculated to be around 850 on most Sundays.

== Y Diwygiwr ==
Rees established the Diwygiwr in 1835 as a direct result of the Congregationalist ministers' disapproval of the increasingly conservative nature of the Efangylydd ("Evangelist"), another publication geared towards the Congregationalists of south Wales, edited by David Owen (Brutus) who was later to become Rees' arch-rival.

Through his editorials in Y Diwygiwr, Rees lucidly disseminated the principles of Nonconformity and his pseudonym was developed from a quote in which he paraphrased Daniel O'Connell's famous "Agitate! Agitate! Agitate!" quote by writing "Cynhyrfer! Cynhyrfer! Cynhyrfer!"

Y Diwygiwr developed during his thirty-year editorship into a powerful voice in the battle against the alleged injustices felt by the Nonconformists, and was used to openly encourage Nonconformists to unite in protest against the oppressive power possessed by a combination of the British state and the Church of England. In addition to promulgating Nonconformist principles, the Diwygiwr also voiced its support for various political and social movements such as the Rebecca Riots, the Chartists, the Liberation Society and the Anti Corn Law League, but did not always advocate the methods they used, especially the most violent.

Rees' rise to prominence was also due to the long-standing feud between him and David Owen ("Brutus") who edited the Anglican publication Yr Haul ("The Sun"). In the literary exchanges between them, Brutus' satirical and vitriolic attacks on both Rees personally and Nonconformism in general were rebuffed by an unequivocal and passionate defence of the Nonconformists' Christian and political principles which were so prevalent in Rees' ideology.

== Public life ==
Like many nineteenth century Welsh nonconformist ministers, Rees became active in public life and served on several bodies including the Llanelly Board of Guardians and the Llanelly Board of Health.

== Bibliography ==
- Y Diwygiwr (1835–1865)
- Iorwerth Jones, David Rees y Cynhyrfwr (Swansea, 1971)
- T. Davies, Bywyd ac Ysgrifeniadau y Diweddar Barch. D. Rees, Llanelli, (Llanelli, 1871) (The life and writings of the late Rev. D. Rees)
- R.T. Jenkins (ed.) Dictionary of Welsh Biography down to 1940 (London, 1959)
- Edwards, Huw (2009). Capeli Llanelli. Our Rich Heritage. Carmarthenshire County Council. ISBN 978-0-906821-77-0.
