= Capel Als, Llanelli =

Church in Carmarthenshire, Wales

Coordinates: 51.6817°N 4.1537°W

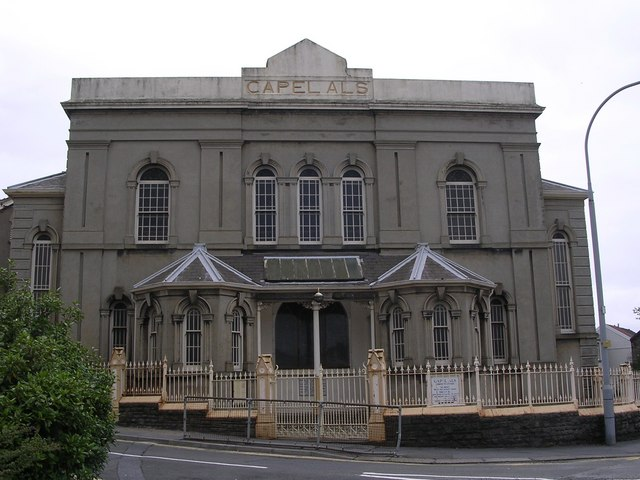
- Capel Als, Llanelli
- Location: Marble Hall Road, Llanelli
- Country: Wales
- Denomination: Independent (Congregationalist)

History
- Founded: 1780

Architecture
- Heritage designation: Grade II
- Designated: 3 December 1992
- Architect: Thomas Thomas
- Architectural type: Chapel
- Style: Late 19th century

Capel Als is an Independent (Congregational) chapel in Llanelli, Carmarthenshire, Wales, It is regarded as one of the most significant religious buildings in Wales. Folk tradition suggested that the name refers to a woman named Als, which along with Alys is the Welsh equivalent of the English name Alice, whose cottage stood where the chapel was built. Another theory contends that the Welsh word als translates as rock, and there is a rock-face behind the chapel. However, there is no word "als" in Welsh meaning rock, and so this latter explanation may be safely disregarded.

It is a Grade II-listed building but many believe it should be accorded more significant status.

== Early history ==
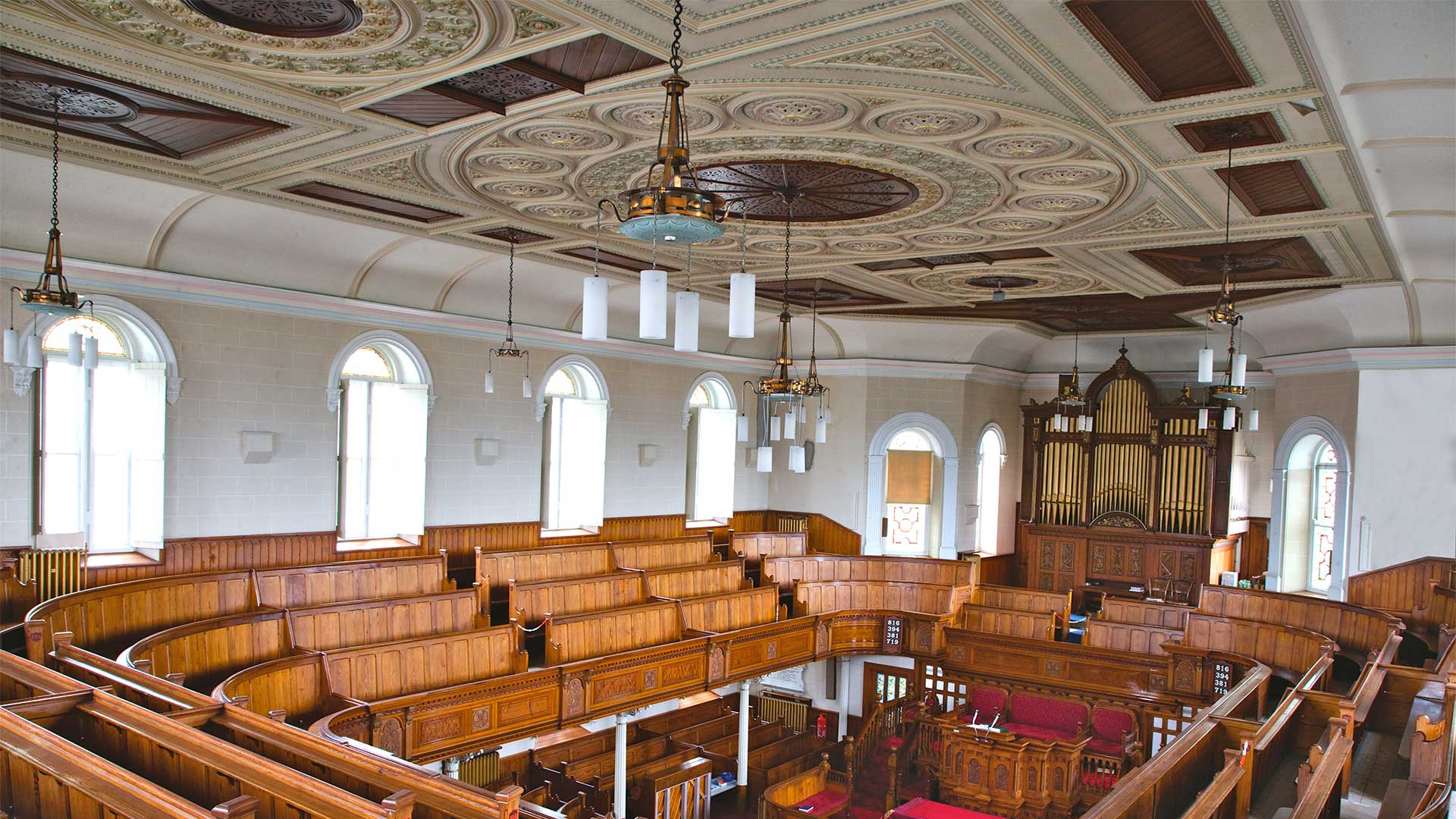
The interior of the chapel

The first building at Capel Als, dating from 1780, is said to have been "very simple and basic" and was extended in 1797. At the time, Llanelli was in the early stages of industrial development as a result of the expansion of the coal, iron and copper industries. The mother church of Capel Als was at Llanedi and it was Evan Davies, minister at Llanedi from 1775 who instigated the formation of churches at Cross Inn (later known as Ammanford), Kidwelly and Pembrey, as well as Llanelli.

== The ministry of David Rees, 1829-69 ==
The first recorded minister was David Rees, a celebrated preacher, publisher and agitator. David Rees arrived in Llanelli in 1829 and inherited a congregation of 250. By 1832, this had grown to 446 and Rees had embarked on replacing the 1797 structure with a much larger building. During the first half of his ministry, Rees was instrumental in establishing several new chapels including Park Church (1839), Siloah (1841) and Capel-y-Bryn (1841). Notwisthstanding the transfer of several hundred members to the new churches, membership at Capel Als stood at 580 in 1850.

The chapel was rebuilt and enlarged in 1852 under the supervision of the architect Thomas Thomas of Landore, Swansea. Thomas subsequently used the Capel Als design at Independent chapels at Pontypool in the following year and seven years later in his home chapel in Llandeilo. Rees had a remarkable career as publisher of the radical journal, Y Diwygiwr (The Reformer) and as a pioneer in the provision of education. He was firmly opposed to the established church and conducted a long running feud with the rector of Llanelli, Ebenezer Morris.

When he died in 1869, the membership at Capel Als stood at over 800.

== The ministry of Thomas Johns, 1869–1914 ==
The minister from 1869 until 1914 was Thomas Johns, a leading figure in Welsh nonconformity,

Johns received a unanimous invitation in 1869 to succeed David Rees as pastor of Capel Als. The invitation was accepted, and Johns remained at Capel Als until his death.

A new schoolroom was built early in his pastorate, and in 1875 a group of members were released to form a new church at Tabernacle, towards the cost of which Capel Als contributed a significant sum. Several hundred members transferred from Capel Als to the new church at Tabernacle, and it was hoped that this would ease the over-crowding at Capel Als, which suffered from poor ventilation and was uncomfortable especially when the chapel was full as it was for the Sunday evening service every week.

The solution was to build a new chapel. Some members wanted to demolish the chapel but old members resisted strongly. Therefore a compromise was reached and the new building maintained many features of the David Rees chapel but it was greatly extended. The work was completed in 1894 by Owen Morris Roberts.

== Later history ==
D.J. Davies became minister at Capel All in 1916 and remained or forty two years until his retirement in 1958. During this period, membership peaked at 1,007 in 1935. He was succeeded by Iorwerth Jones who published a biography of David Rees during his ministry. Maurice Loader was minister from 1975 until 1994.

== Sources ==
- Edwards, Huw (2009). Capeli Llanelli. Our Rich Heritage. Carmarthenshire County Council. ISBN 978-0-906821-77-0.
