= Thomas Thomas (architect) =

Welsh minister and architect (1817–1888)

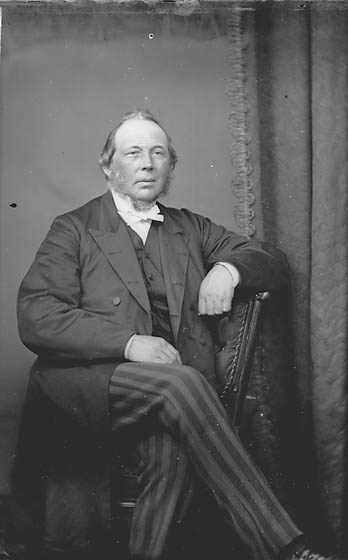
- Portrait photograph by John Thomas (c. 1875)
- Born: 1817; Llandeilo, Carmarthenshire
- Died: 16 March 1888 (aged 70–71); Mumbles, Swansea
- Other names: Thomas Glandŵr; Thomas Landore
- Occupations: Church minister and chapel architect

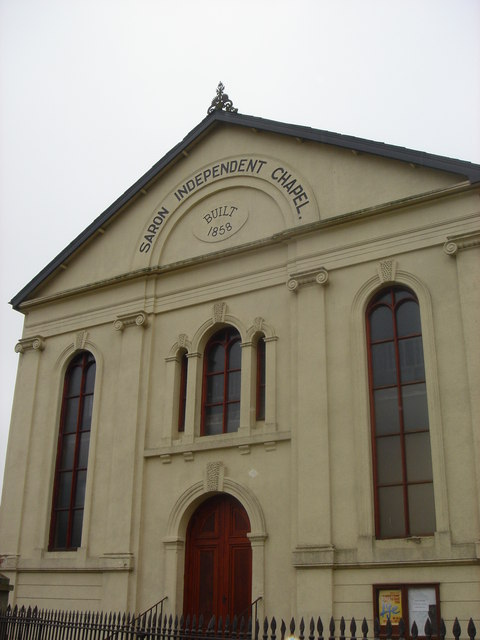
Saron Welsh Independent Chapel, Tredegar

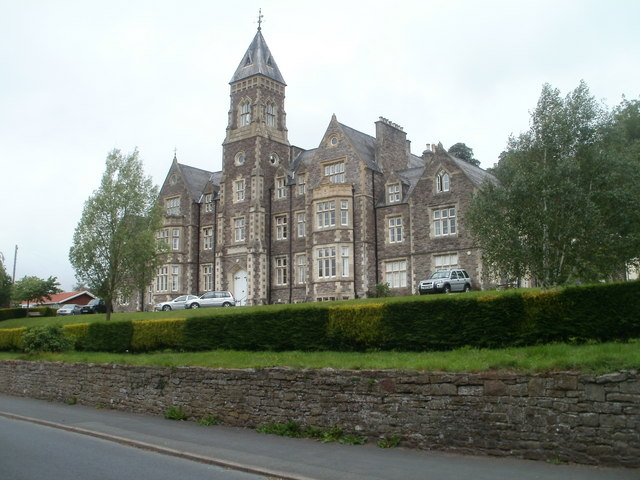
Brecon Congregational Memorial College

Thomas Thomas (1817 – 16 March 1888) was a Welsh church minister and chapel architect, also known as Thomas Glandŵr (Thomas Landore). He is described as "the first national architect of Wales" and the "unchallenged master of chapel architecture in Wales in the 1860s".

== Early life ==
Thomas Thomas was born in 1817 and brought up near Ffairfach, at Llandeilo, Carmarthenshire. His father ran a carpentry business, where Thomas worked before moving to Swansea.

== Religious ministry ==
Though he had no formal training he was appointed as a chapel minister in Clydach in 1848, a post which he held until 1853. Reverend Thomas subsequently became a Congregational minister at Landore, Swansea, until he resigned in 1875. It has been conjectured that he resigned after it was discovered he was the owner of sub-standard workers housing in north Swansea.

== Architecture ==
Thomas was also known an architect and began designing chapels in 1848 and continued through the chapel-building boom of the 1860s and '70s, designing not only for his own Congregational denomination but for others too. He had redesigned Landore's own Siloh Chapel in 1860. The New Siloh Chapel (1878) in Landore was, however, designed after Thomas's resignation by Thomas Freeman who had been a builder and surveyor of the Reverend Thomas's earlier chapels.

Thomas Thomas is credited with at least 119 chapels across Wales. He also made sure he garnered the distinction of preaching the first sermon (or one of the first sermons) at each of his new chapels. His trademark design feature of chapels was the giant arch in the pediment on the facade of his buildings. He also invented the stylistic interior feature of dipping the chapel gallery behind the preacher's pulpit.

== Later life ==
After resigning as a church minister, Thomas moved to Mumbles. He died there on 16 March 1888 and was buried at Sketty.

== Notable works ==
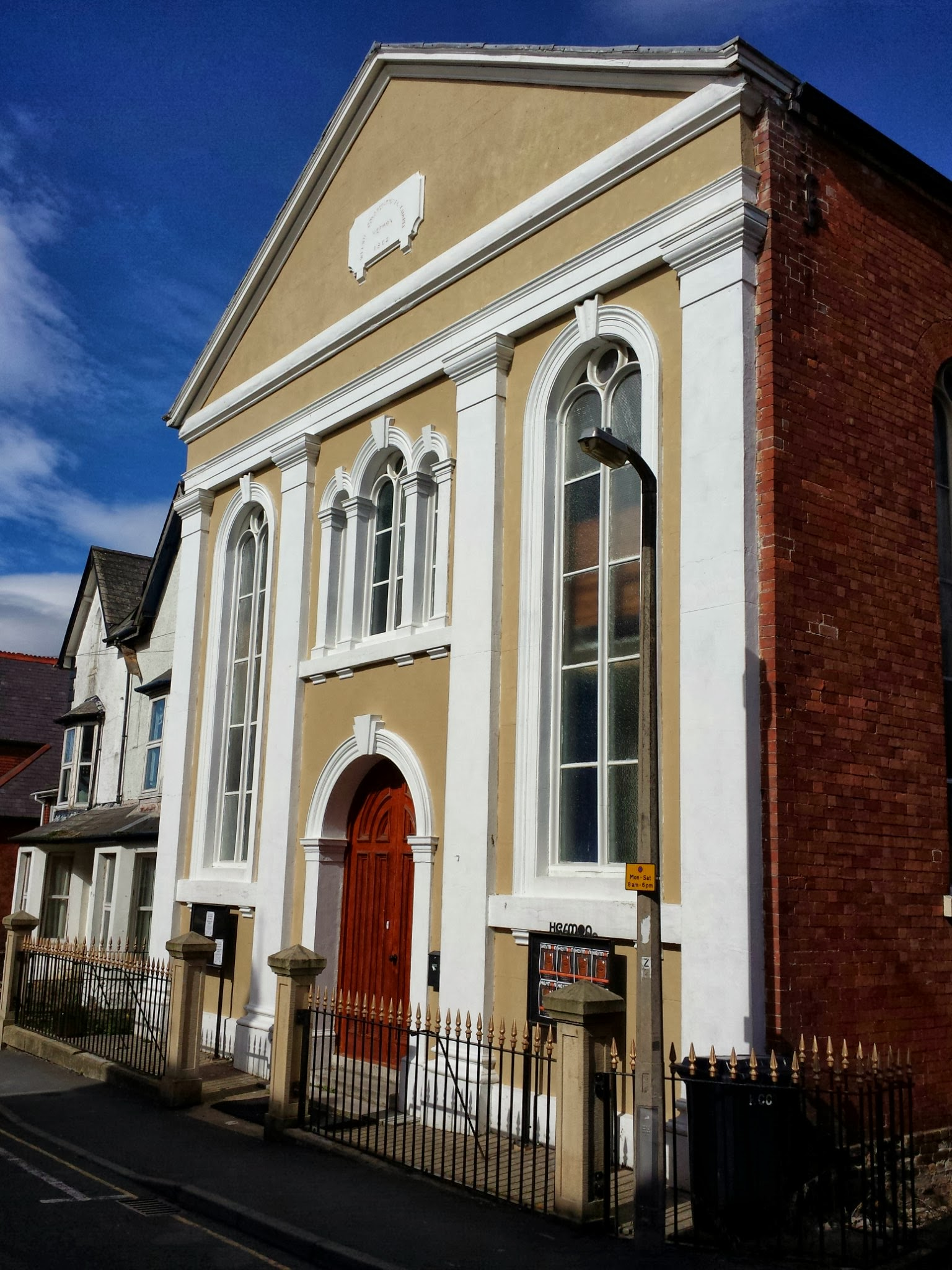
Hermon Chapel, Oswestry

- Capel Bethel, Llansamlet, Swansea, Glamorgan (1849–51 and 1879/80)
- Capel Als, Llanelli, Carmarthenshire (1852/3)
- Saron Welsh Independent Chapel, Tredegar, Monmouthshire (1858)
- Capel Tabernacl, Ffairfach, Carmarthenshire (1860)
- Salem Welsh Independent Chapel, Porthmadog, Caernarfonshire (1860)
- Sardis Independent Chapel and Schoolroom, Ystradgynlais, Brecknockshire (1860/1)
- Carmel Welsh Independent Chapel, Porth Amlwch, Anglesey (1861/2)
- Capel Mair, St Clears, Carmarthenshire (1862)
- Ebenezer Welsh Independent Chapel, Swansea, Glamorgan (1862)
- Hermon Chapel and Sunday School, Oswestry, Shropshire, England (1862), now Grade II* listed.
- Brecon Congregational Memorial College, Brecknockshire (1869), a college until 1959 later converted into flats.
- Seion Independent Chapel, Llandysul, Cardiganshire (1870/1)
- Hope Independent Chapel, Pontardulais, Swansea (1872)
- Jerusalem Independent Chapel, Resolven, Glamorgan (1876)
- Tabor United Reformed Church, Maesycwmmer, Monmouthshire (1876), now Grade II* listed.
- Mount Pleasant Baptist Chapel, Pembroke, Pembrokeshire (1878)
- Capel Salem, Llangennech, Carmarthenshire (1879)
- Providence Independent Chapel and house, Llangadog, Carmarthenshire (1883/4)
- Bethania Welsh Independent Chapel, Bethesda, Caernarfonshire
- Bethesda Chapel, Llanwrtyd Wells, Powys (enlarged/rebuilt in 1907 by Beddoe Rees, also known as Bethel Chapel)

== Sources ==
- Hughes, Stephen (2000), Copperopolis: Landscapes of the Early Industrial Period in Swansea, Royal Commission on the Ancient and Historical Monuments of Wales, ISBN 978-1871184327
