= History of education in Wales (1701–1870) =

- 1701–1870
before 1701	1870–1939
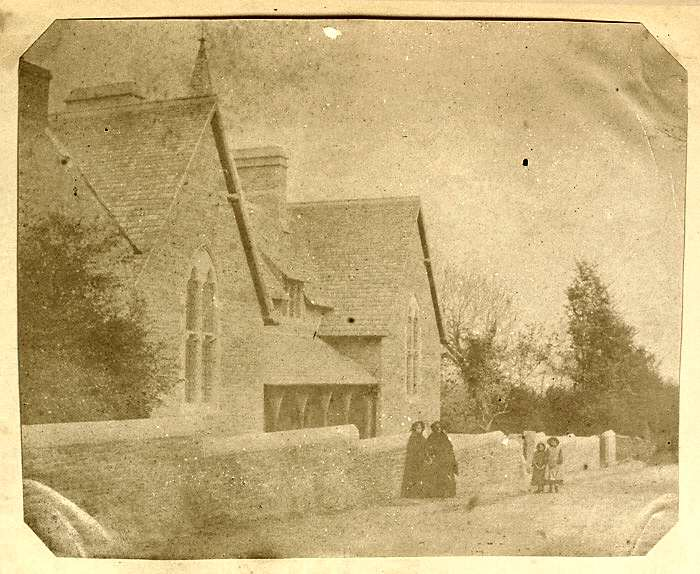
- School in Sketty, Swansea, photographed by Augustus Lennox in 1854

Between 1701 and the 1870 Elementary Education Act, access to formal education expanded in Wales, though remained short of universal.

During the 18th century, several philanthropic efforts were made to provide education to poorer children and sometimes adults; these included schools established by the Society for Promoting Christian Knowledge (SPCK), circulating schools, Sunday schools and endowed elementary schools. This allowed many Welsh peasants to learn to read and develop an interest in religion. In the early to mid-19th century, charitable schools were established to provide a basic education. Private schools aimed at the working classes also existed. Most elementary-level schools taught a limited curriculum and made use of corporal punishment. State funding was introduced to schools from 1833. This was followed by school inspections and teacher training. Physical punishment declined in schools in the mid-19th century. From 1862, schools had to participate in standardised tests to receive grants.

Some use of the Welsh language was made in 18th-century philanthropic education at a time when the Welsh peasantry was, for the most part, solely Welsh-speaking. In the early 19th century Welsh public opinion was keen for children to learn the English language. Many schools tried to achieve this by excluding Welsh and punishing children for speaking the language. The Welsh Not was a method of punishment used at many schools and remains well known in Wales. Government investigations in the mid-19th century indicated that this approach was ineffective and that some use of Welsh in schools was necessary to teach English. The government did not prohibit the use of Welsh but it did little to promote bilingualism in schools during this period.

Grammar schools continued to exist but experienced difficulties, and by the end of the period provision of secondary education was very limited. Dissenter academies and later theological colleges offered a higher level of education. Girls' involvement in elementary and secondary education increased, but remained more limited than for boys.

== Background ==
=== Terminology ===
The idea of dividing schooling into different levels of progression was not well established during this period. Welsh and English contemporaries usually saw schooling instead in terms of the social class it was intended for; distinguishing between "elementary" education (for the working classes) and "middle-class" education. Elementary education was equivalent to the modern term primary education and was most people's sole experience of schooling. It catered for all ages of children and sometimes adults. Historians use the term secondary education to describe schooling aimed at older children in particular as well as middle- and upper-class children of all ages. Grammar schools were a type of secondary school that were based on an endowment.

=== Early modern education in Wales ===
Several grammar schools were established in Wales in the 16th and 17th centuries to cater to boys of "the middling sort". A few schools provided a more basic level of instruction; sometimes as preparation for grammar schools. There were other less formal ways that some children may have received a little education. Formal education was nevertheless unattainable for the vast majority of the population in the 16th and much of the 17th century. Growing concern about illiteracy on religious grounds led to Cromwell's government and the clergyman Thomas Gouge establishing short-lived school systems in Wales in the later 17th century. During the medieval period, some Welshmen began to attend universities outside Wales. Attendance became increasingly common during the early modern period.

=== Historical context, 1701–1870 ===
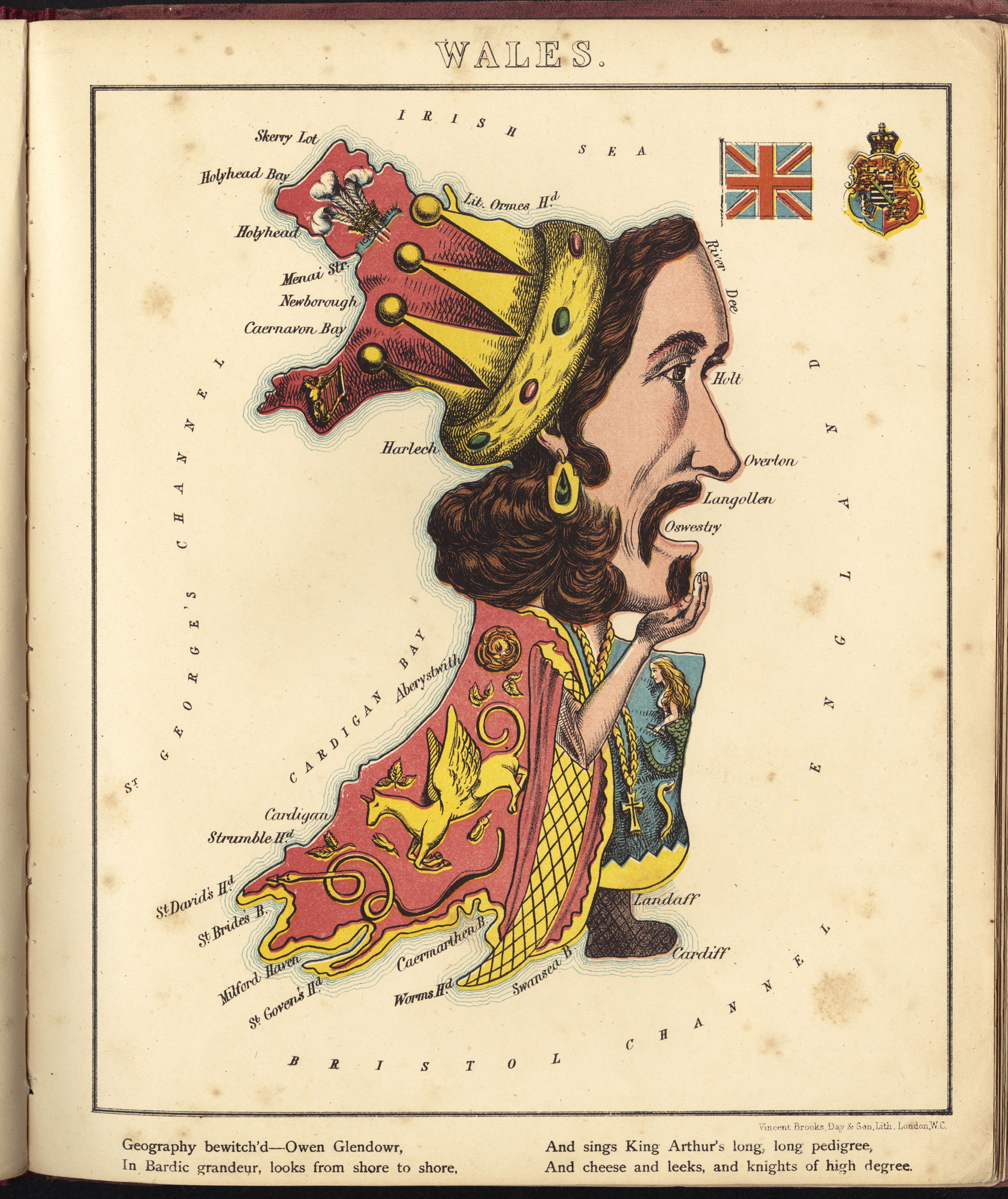
Map of Wales personified as Owain Glyndŵr, which appeared in Geographical Fun (1868) by William Harvey

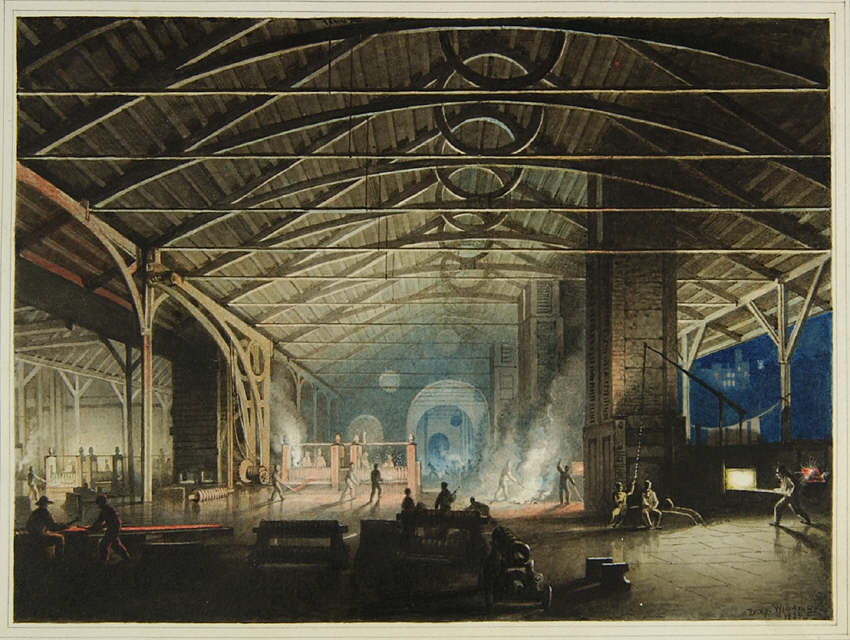
Cyfarthfa Ironworks Interior at Night, a painting by Penry Williams (1825)

Satirical cartoon depicting the Rebecca Riots in Punch (1843)

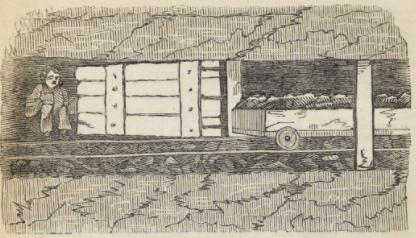
Engraving of a trapper, child employed to open and close barriers in a coal mine, which appeared in the Royal Commission of Inquiry into Children's Employment (1842)

Wales had been integrated into the Kingdom of England by the Laws in Wales Acts 1535 and 1542. Those acts had also made English the language of government. The Kingdom of England united with Scotland to form the Kingdom of Great Britain in 1707 and with Ireland to form the United Kingdom of Great Britain and Ireland in 1801. The remaining legal distinctions between Wales and England were abolished during this period.

Sporadic religiously motivated attempts by members of the wealthier classes to develop mass literacy in the later 17th century continued in the 18th century with more success. Malcolm Seaborne, who has studied early modern Welsh schools, argued that this was a result of the "new religious outlook", which had developed out of the upheavals of the 16th and 17th centuries, having a growing influence on the attitudes of the general public. The value of schools for the poor in the eyes of their founders was the religious and moral education of the masses as well as preparation for work. More idealistic arguments about uplifting the poor through knowledge and religion began to be made towards the end of the century. Basic education was attractive to peasants themselves because they wanted to be able to read the Bible, though there is uncertainty about why this desire developed.

The American Revolutionary War and the French Revolution in the late 18th century led to anxiety in government about Britain's political stability. Although the industrial revolution improved living conditions for the Welsh population in general, the population of industrial areas increased sharply with migration from rural Wales, western England and Ireland. Overcrowded, unsanitary towns developed where the poorest could find little assistance. Rural areas also experienced economic difficulties, especially during the depression in the years after 1815. Hunger and poor housing were a common problem in these areas. Both the rural and urban working classes worked long hours with little leisure.

The traditional social hierarchy began to break down. Instances of social unrest, such as the Rebecca Riots and the 1831 Merthyr Rising, took place in Wales and there were worries that a lack of moral standards was corrupting children. Schooling was believed to be an effective response to these problems. In an 1843 report, HMI (Her Majesty's Inspector) (Note: Formal title for a school inspector. His or Her Majesty is a formal term of address for the Monarch of the United Kingdom.) H. W. Bellairs described a "band of efficient schoolmasters" as a cheaper alternative to "a body of police or of soldiery" to manage "an ill-educated, undisciplined population, such as exists among the mines of South Wales". It was hoped that schooling would inculcate moral virtues, encourage acceptance of the social order and guide children away from crime.

There was a degree of scepticism towards the idea of creating a state education system. Some saw schooling as a matter for the Church, while others believed that education was a form of charity rather than a right or thought that giving the state that amount of power over the upbringing of the next generation would be a threat to liberty. Martin Johnes, who has written a history of schools' attitude to the Welsh language during this period, commented that the 19th-century British state was "highly moralistic and deeply worried about costs" with a commitment to "laissez-faire [non-interventionist] politics". The government did not begin to fund education until the 1830s, and its role in education remained limited throughout the mid-19th century. Schools were voluntary and charged fees.

Children in rural areas were employed to help with farm work. W. B. Stephens, a historian of British education, argues that the process of industrialisation often led to a stagnation or decline of literacy levels. In industrial areas of South Wales, boys and girls were employed to do simple tasks in mines and ironworks. Child labour was widely available, well-paying by the standards of the time and many parents saw schooling as unnecessary. Many parents did value education and some were willing to make significant personal sacrifices to send their children to school. Younger children were often ill-equipped for paid work and schools could act as a form of childcare. Nevertheless, fees and, in some schools, an expectation that children would dress well or bring in their own equipment were sometimes beyond parents' financial means. It might also be difficult for them to do without a child's wages. A farm labourer in Cardiganshire with six illiterate children told the Commission on the Employment of Children, Young Persons, and Women in Agriculture (1867);

There is no school in the parish where I live, and if there was I could not afford to send my children to it. I never get meat, except now and then a bit of bacon. I live upon potatoes, bread and cheese, and a little butter. The labour of children becomes valuable after 10; a boy of that age can earn 11. 10s. a year, besides getting his meals at the farm house … Education is a good thing, but bread for a poor man is better.

== 18th-century schooling ==
=== Elementary education ===
Schools were operated by private businesses, charities and the Church in 18th-century England and Wales, and became reasonably common. According to Stephens, charity schools in Wales tended to have a particularly heavy emphasis on religion, reflecting the preferences of the Welsh peasantry.

In the early 18th century, many charity schools were established with the support of the Society for Promoting Christian Knowledge (SPCK). Nearly 100 SPCK schools had been founded in Wales by 1714. The SPCK schools attempted to assist the poorest families to reduce the financial sacrifice of sending a child to school. An aspect of the schools that was very popular was their emphasis on training children in practical skills: for instance, working with textiles for girls, and farm work or seafaring for boys. They might organise apprenticeships and supervision after boys had left school. The schools also attempted to inculcate certain moral values and a sense of their class position into children, but this was deemed less necessary in Wales where people were already particularly socially divided. The government's fear of a largely imagined threat of Jacobitism in Wales led to the Welsh SPCK schools having an especially heavy emphasis on religion. There were conflicts within the organisation; for instance, some of the Society's leaders were accused of disloyalty to the Crown during the 1715 Jacobite Rebellion. One of the main limitations of the schools was that peasant children had other work to do and being educated was of little financial benefit for them.

Circulating schools were developed in the 1730s by the Reverend Griffith Jones, a Welsh clergyman in the Church of England. They originated within Wales and aimed to cater to people of all ages. Children's classes were conducted in the daytime and adults' in the evenings. The schools only taught the ability to read, other subjects being theoretically forbidden. They ran for three months during the period when demand for labour was lowest, usually winter. Accommodation was found wherever available: even barns were used if necessary. Jones believed that a mass educational project was better than a higher-quality selective one. He received donations from several patrons, English as well as Welsh. He informed them about the progress of the schools through an annual publication Welch Piety. According to one estimate, circulating schools taught around half of the Welsh population in the mid-18th century. Greater interest developed in reading the Bible across all social classes of the Welsh population. The movement became well known internationally; historians of Welsh education Gareth Elwyn Jones and Gordan Wynne Roderick describe it as "among the most important educational experiments anywhere in Europe in the eighteenth century". With the exception of some smaller initiatives in the Scottish highlands, it was a novelty in Britain.

By the late 18th century the circulating schools had largely faded away, replaced by Sunday schools. These developed from the 1780s onwards. Early Sunday schools tended to admit adults as well as children. In Wales, they were generally nonconformist and often associated with the Methodist revival. Welsh Sunday schools tended to focus on religion and reading, avoiding the wider secular education sometimes taught at Sunday schools elsewhere.

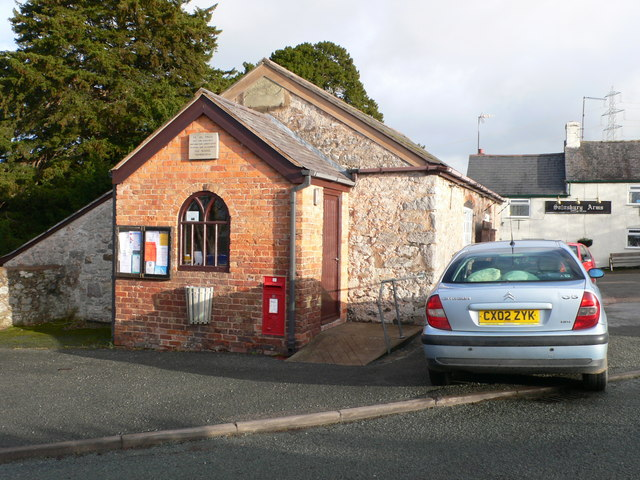
School building dating from 1765 in Tremeirchion, Denbighshire, now a village hall

Almost 80 endowments for elementary schools in Wales were made by individuals between 1700 and 1800. For instance, an article in the Newcastle Courant from 1716 noted that Daniel Williams, a wealthy clergyman who died childless, had left his estate to several causes including "a large sum for the building of 10 charity schools in Wales, and endowing the same". Most endowments were made by non-Church officials and some were made by women, providing a slight increase in the availability of education for poorer girls. The schools were spread across all counties; Denbighshire had the greatest number. Usually, they consisted of a single schoolroom, but there was an increase in specially built multi-storey accommodation towards the end of the century, though they often used other facilities, such as religious buildings, the schoolmaster's house or market buildings. The new forms of education targeted at the poor were not without their critics. Some people, even among those who gave them financial support, worried that the peasantry was being over-educated and exposed to disruptive ideas, especially towards the end of the 18th century.

Stephens wrote that several commercially-run schools aimed at the working classes and organised by people of the same social background also existed. Dame schools were intended for very young children and often taught little. Common day schools taught an elementary-level curriculum to a slightly older age range. Schools in these groups were common across Britain and becoming more widespread. Some of these schools existed in Wales—for instance in 1739, "a poor mangy person" in Henllan Amgoed, Carmarthenshire was said to run a school where "scholars were poor men's children"—though information about them is quite limited. In 1855, the Lady's Newspaper and Pictorial Times described the life of Griffith Davies, a man born in 1788, whose story it described as "a notable instance of self-advancement". According to the newspaper, Davies had worked in a quarry in Caernarfon as a boy and "...he had almost attained manhood before he got any schooling. But he put himself to school, practiced arithmetic with an iron pencil on the sleight he quarried...". He moved to London becoming a teacher and later a prominent mathematician.

=== Grammar schools ===
Grammar schools had difficulties during this period, though there was some evidence of an increase in demand. Some of them disappeared or became elementary schools. The gentry had become fewer in number, wealthier and more detached from the lands they owned; they tended to prefer to send their sons to the English public schools and were less interested in financing grammar schools. The endowments made in the 16th and 17th centuries were increasingly financially inadequate. These endowments enforced a classical education which seemed outdated to the parents of some potential pupils, though learning Latin was still an important part of preparing to enter professions, especially the clergy.

Grammar schools became more reliant on their fee-paying pupils and frequently expanded with more accommodation for boarding pupils. This led to schools evolving into institutions closer to the modern idea of a public school, but this was more the case in England than in Wales. There was an expansion in the teaching of non-classical subjects in grammar schools, which seems to have often particularly benefited the wealthiest pupils. Commenting on the case of Friars School in Bangor, Seaborne quotes an unnamed historian as saying that "at this period there was in Friars more than at any previous time since the foundation of the school, a clique of rich boys who enjoyed special tuition and privileges denied to the poorer scholars".

Most teachers at these schools had a good knowledge of Latin and they were frequently involved in scholarship, such as studying the history of their area. For instance, John Thomas, a teacher at Beaumaris Grammar school, wrote about the history of Anglesey. The boys who attended these schools grew up to form Wales's social elite and some participated in similar research.

=== Mixed language use ===
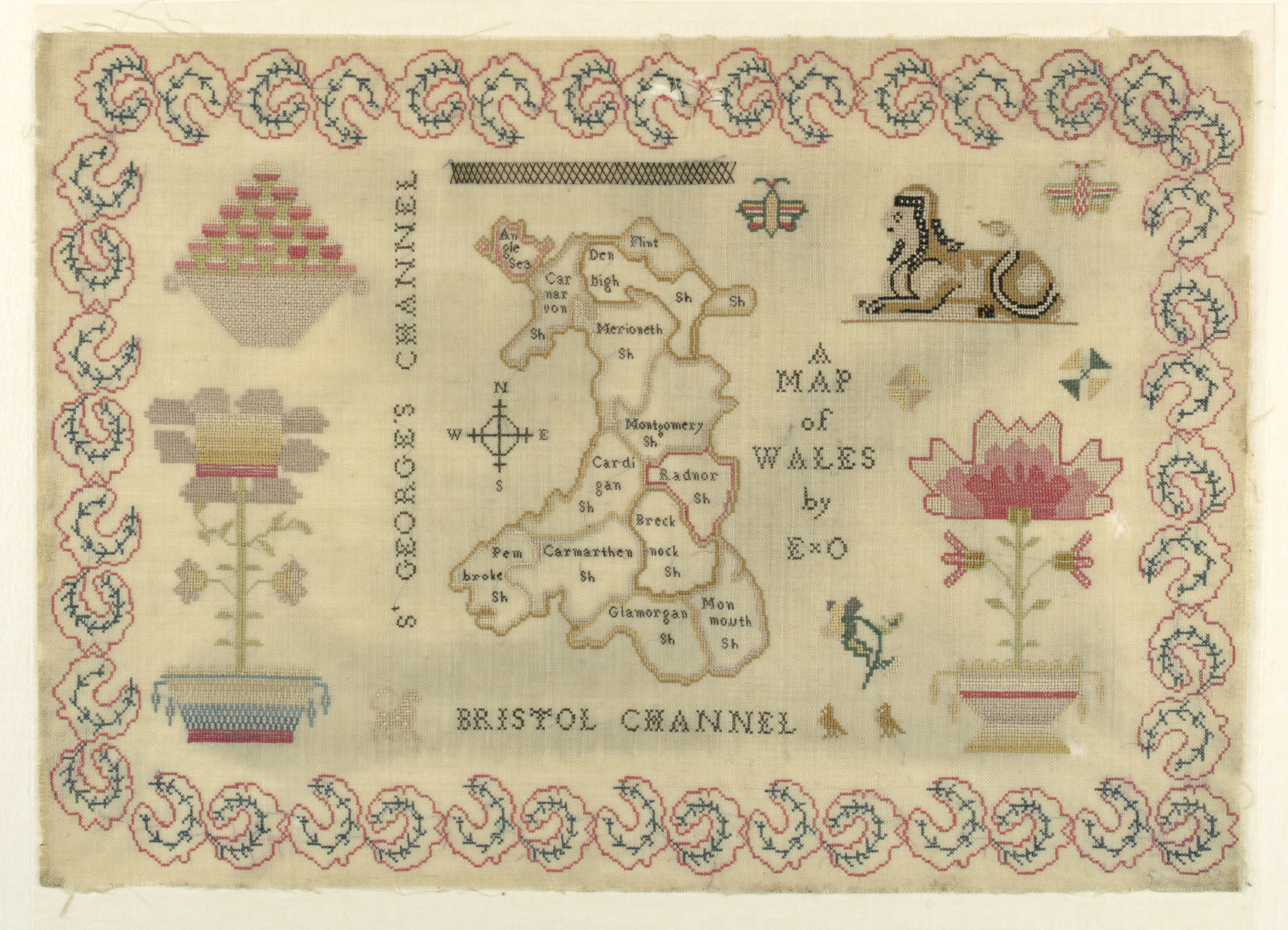
Sampler, task completed in needlework lessons, dating from the 18th century.

Stephens observed that in 18th-century charity schools, "the vernacular [local language] was used as a medium of instruction more readily [in Wales] than in Gaelic-speaking parts of Scotland". The typical medium of instruction in the SPCK schools was English but speaking Welsh in the schools was not restricted and over 12 schools in North Wales were conducted in Welsh. Jones and Roderick wrote that circulating schools used Welsh as their medium of instruction and aimed to teach the ability to read in Welsh only. Russell Grigg, an academic with an interest in the history of Welsh education, states that English was used where it was the local preference. The Welsh language teaching was criticised by some of their patrons but the practice was defended by Griffith Jones. He argued that previous efforts at mass education had gained limited traction because they had been conducted in English at a time when Welsh was the sole language of a large majority of the Welsh peasantry. Endowments for 18th-century elementary schools sometimes specified Welsh or English as the language to be used but according to Seaborne, this did not always reflect the reality of how lessons were conducted. The Sunday schools established in Wales in the late 18th century were conducted in Welsh.

== Early 19th-century schooling ==
=== Elementary education ===
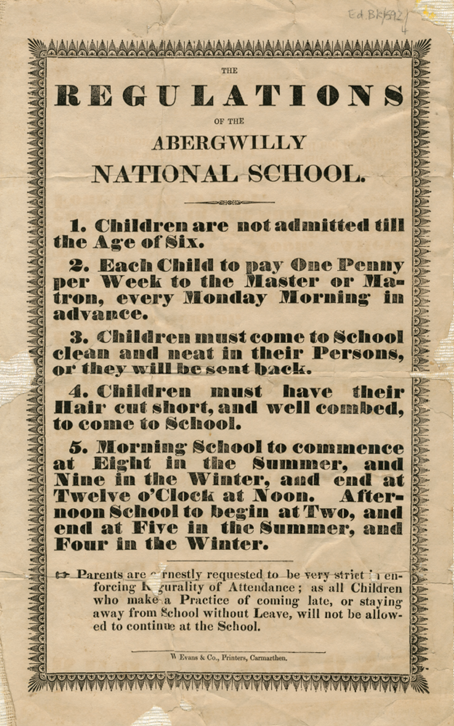
Guidance for parents of children at an Anglican school in Abergwili, Carmarthenshire (c. 1801 – c. 1850)

The British and Foreign School Society (which was Nonconformist) and the National Society for Promoting Religious Education (which was Anglican) were founded in 1808 and 1811 respectively. These organisations began to establish "voluntary schools". A large majority of voluntary schools belonged to the latter group which had some practical advantages, but both societies lacked the financial resources to have much success in the 1810s and 1820s. The local social elite were also needed to donate money to schools affiliated with the two societies. Though the gentry did make a contribution, the fact that Wales had less of a middle class than England undermined efforts to fund education.

Initially, voluntary schools tended to be free but it quickly became the norm for them to charge fees. They attempted to maximise the number of children taught by using the monitorial system with older, more able pupils passing on information from their teacher to the other children. The curriculum was focused on the three R's (reading, writing and arithmetic); practical skills were sometimes also taught. Jones and Roderick give the following description of the curriculum of an Anglican voluntary school:

In Penley National School in Flintshire, for example, there were three classes. The lowest committed the Lord's Prayer and the alphabet to memory and learned the National Society's work cards. In the next class the children learned to write on slates, read a religious text and learn the Catechism. The top class read from the Bible and did simple number work.

There were also other charitable schools; some circulating schools continued to exist and permanent schools were funded by the local elite in certain areas. But most elementary schools were commercial and some were essentially child-minding. They tended to have an emphasis on strict discipline; corporal punishment and public humiliation was common. Teachers were untrained and some behaved sadistically; they were often people with health problems who were unable to take other work. Most teachers did not make regular use of physical punishment; the threat was used as a deterrent, reinforcing adult authority and training children in obedience, an important goal of education at the time.

Schools often used whatever buildings were available; they were frequently insanitary and poorly furnished. Even when school buildings were designed for the purpose, patrons took little interest in their appearance. A study published in 1992 commented that most surviving school buildings from the early decades of the 19th century consisted of a schoolroom with attached accommodation for the teacher's household. They tended to have been built with stone and slate. Larger schools often included two schoolrooms for children of each sex. Multi-storey buildings were rare.

=== Exclusion of Welsh ===
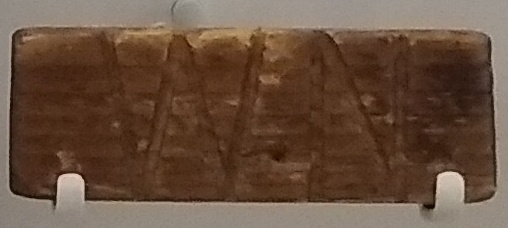
Example of a Welsh Not displayed at St Fagans Museum

The only areas of Wales where English was widely spoken in the first half of the 19th century were places close to the Anglo-Welsh border, the Gower Peninsula and southern Pembrokeshire. The language was becoming more widespread in the industrialising areas due to migration. Welsh speakers were keen for their children to learn English; knowing the language was felt to be a route to social mobility, made life more convenient and was a status symbol. Contemporaries often said that parents wanted schools to be conducted in English. The Reverend Bowen Jones of Narberth told an inquiry following the Rebecca Riots that a school conducted in Welsh in his area was unsuccessful, whereas in schools where "the schoolmaster has to teach them English, and to talk English in the school, there is no room in the school-room to admit all that come". The upper- and middle-classes in Wales, who generally spoke English, were also eager for the masses to learn the language. They believed it would contribute to Wales's economic development and that tenants or employees who could speak English would be easier to manage.

Teaching English was therefore widely accepted as the main function of working-class schooling. As Welsh was a language associated with religion, it seemed natural for Welsh teaching to be kept in Sunday school. Often Welsh was entirely excluded from day schools; (Note: In this context, day school refers to schools operating during the working week as opposed to Sunday school.) speaking to a government enquiry in 1887, HMI Dan Isaac Evans said about schools in Wales half a century earlier, "The idea is that if you shut Welsh out of the schoolroom and the playground, you are in that way likely to teach English better". The day schools created by the voluntary societies in the early 19th century were usually conducted in English. A few charitable schools taught Welsh but the norm was for patrons to request they teach English, and circulating schools had shifted to largely teaching in English. The focus of private working-class schools was also on teaching English.

The Welsh Not was a form of discipline used at some schools. The details of the practice varied; in general, children would be given an object when they were caught speaking Welsh and pass it on if they heard another child speaking the language. The child holding the object at the end of the day would be punished. Johnes wrote that the practice may have originated in early modern grammar schools which aimed to teach Latin. Early accounts of the punishment date from the late 18th century but most accounts relate to the early to mid-19th century. Johnes believes it was probably widespread but not universal in the first half of the 19th century. There are records of it being used almost everywhere in Wales, but it was less common in Monmouthshire and Glamorgan where English was more established. It was seen as a way to teach English by immersing children in the language; similar approaches to teaching languages were used around Western Europe. The method also encouraged children to participate in enforcing discipline by listening for peers speaking Welsh and was a way to keep solely Welsh-speaking children quiet; enforcing silence was considered important for managing a school.

=== Participation rates and literacy ===
Although school participation rates in the early to mid-19th century are somewhat hard to assess, a lower proportion of the population were enrolled in day schools in Wales than in England or Scotland. One estimate is that 85 per cent of children in Wales between five and fifteen years old were not in day school in 1821. The proportion who attended at some point in childhood would have been higher. Sunday schools were often used as a substitute for full-time schooling. An 1839 study examined a group of families in a mining area who were considered representative; of the 23 children studied, 14 attended Sunday school compared to two who attended day school. According to Stephens:

... in Wales and Monmouthshire educational progress suffered from the difficulties Welsh speakers experienced in schools using English as the medium of instruction, from the absence of resident gentry, the weakness of the Church of England and the opposition of dissenters [Nonconformists] to its influence. This was compounded by widespread poverty and the expansion of coal mining.

In 1844 56 per cent of grooms and 35 per cent of brides were able to sign the marriage register in South Wales counties; (Note: According to Stephens, marriage signature rates during this period reflect the extent of schooling around 15 years earlier; but the correlation is complicated by the fact people might have grown up in a different place to where they married.) this was lower than in any individual Scottish or English county. At the same time, 58 per cent of grooms and 39 per cent of brides in North Wales counties were able to do so, the ratio being lower than any Scottish or English county other than Monmouthshire (then part of England) and Staffordshire. Girls' education was given less importance than that of boys during this period and their participation in day schools was lower. The number of people who were able to write was also lower than those who could read, because reading was seen as a more basic skill which was taught first and tended to be more practically useful.

== Mid-19th-century schooling ==
=== Growing government involvement ===
From 1833 the two voluntary societies began to receive government funding. There were 177 schools in Wales run by the National Society by 1839; most taught a summary of Anglican belief called the Catechism. The involvement of these schools irritated Nonconformists who accurately saw them as an attempt to attract children to Anglicanism. Meanwhile, there were roughly 30 schools in Wales run by the British Society in the 1840s. Hugh Owen, a civil servant, wrote A Letter to the Welsh People (1843) arguing that more Nonconformist schools were needed to avoid the "oppressive yoke" of Anglican schooling being forced on localities. This created an impetus for the expansion of the British Society's influence in Wales.

In 1839 the Committee of the Privy Council on Education (CCE) was formed and conducted state inspections of schools receiving grants in England and Wales for the first time. HMI Hugh Seymour Tremenheere visited 35 schools in mining areas of South Wales for the CCE's first report in 1840. He wrote that the schools were "for the most part, dirty and close [unventilated]" and one was "so filthy and disgusting that the inquiry had to be conducted from outside". Most of the schools were lacking in books and equipment, and teachers maintained discipline using "loud exclamations and threats". In contrast, HMI Harry Longueville Jones was impressed by the quality of teaching he found on his first tour of 190 schools across Wales in 1849. He complimented various teachers as "very able", "studious", "clever", "well informed", "alert" and "well respected". He also noted a few teachers with exceptional abilities such as one working near Pwllheli who taught Latin to his most able pupils and another in Llanidloes whose "forte lies in his music".

Attempts to regulate child labour had little effect in Wales before the 1840s. The 1842 Mines Act prohibited females of all ages and boys under the age of 10 from working underground in mines, though this was not well enforced. The 1844 Factory Act required factory workers under the age of fourteen to attend school part-time. The 1867 Factory Extension Act expanded this requirement to industry working with metal. Attempts to educate children part-time were often ineffective as pupils were tired from work and teaching was frequently poor. Similarly, evening schools had limited success because the idea of mental labour after a day of physical work was unattractive.

The 1834 Poor Law Amendment Act introduced a system of workhouses, state-funded homes for the destitute, though they were slow to be established in the north west and middle of Wales. The children living in these institutions were required to receive a minimum of three hours' schooling each day. Most workhouses had their own classrooms, though some sent child residents to voluntary schools where they were frequently bullied. The teachers at workhouse schools had a degree of impunity as they did not have to satisfy paying parents. Henry Morton Stanley, born John Rowlands, wrote a memoir about his childhood in St Asaph workhouse in the 1840s and 1850s. He described his teacher as an angry, violent man: "Whatever might be the nature of the offence, or merely because his irritable mood required vent, our poor heads were cuffed, and slapped, and pounded, until we lay speechless and streaming with blood ... such blows were preferable to deliberate punishment with the birch, ruler or cane, which, with cool malice, he inflicted." Stanley believed that the teacher had caused the death of one of his classmates through a heavy beating.

The first teacher training colleges were established in Wales in the second half of the 1840s and it slowly became the norm for headteachers to be trained. Teacher training colleges had existed in England for several decades and had begun to receive state funding in 1839. They were a response to what was felt to be the inadequacy of some teachers and a part of the indirect approach the government was taking to influencing schools. Joseph Lancaster, an educationalist whose theories were popular at the time, had encouraged schools to use methods of discipline focused on publicly identifying children who had misbehaved rather than physical punishment. Lancaster's ideas along with a wider change in public attitudes seems to have led to some decline in violent discipline in schools. The two voluntary societies were also expanding school provision; the percentage of children at school in Wales increased from approximately 30 per cent to approximately 48 per cent during the 1850s.

The Newcastle Commission led to the introduction of the Revised Code of 1862. The code introduced a system of payment by results, with grants based on pupils' knowledge of the three R's and attendance. The code has been praised for encouraging teachers to focus on academic skills rather than religion, but it was also controversial. The curriculum taught at a majority of schools had already been limited; but some schools narrowed teaching to focus on grant-earning subjects. The inspection day was a major event for schools; lessons might be extended in the run-up, the school would be cleaned and the children would be encouraged to dress well. Some inspectors were harshly critical and teachers could behave deceptively. There were controversies about the behaviour of individual schools and inspectors. Inspectors were generally lenient judges and believed that reducing a struggling school's funding was counterproductive. The large majority of children passed the inspection exam but the test was largely one of memory.

=== Curriculum ===
An 1847 government report included lists of the subjects taught in every day school in Wales. The lists tended to focus heavily on reading, writing, arithmetic and religion. Some schools taught a wider range of subjects such as vocal music, grammar, drawing, geography and the history of England. Certain teachers are known to have taught lessons focused on Welsh topics in the 1860s. A few schools taught subjects such as algebra, chemistry, astronomy and training for employment. An 1864 manual on teaching Welsh children with little English recommended that older children should be given information on subjects such as "countries ... and important events in the reigns of English Kings" to memorise. However, the book was cautious about widening the curriculum, commenting that "indispensable" subjects such as reading and religion should be prioritised.

The Bible was often used in reading lessons as it was widely available and many schools had been established with a religious motivation. Some schools were buying books from the commercial market intended for children learning to read. These books were more effective teaching materials, especially as many children were also learning a new language, but schools had difficulties affording enough copies and different versions for varying levels of ability. The 1864 manual argued that dictation was a useful way for pupils to practise their spelling. The manual indicated that the emphasis of writing lessons for younger children should be on dictation, but argued that more advanced pupils should be expected to write in their own words about topics within their realm of experience. It commented that this would make pupils think about their work, help them learn how to write and, by extension, speak naturally in English.

In the mid 19th century, educated opinion was increasingly sympathetic to female schooling; which was considered a way to make them better wives and mothers. One example of this view was Y Gymraes [The Welshwoman], a short-lived journal edited by Evan Jones in the early 1850s. While celebrating the Victorian ideal of women being devoted housewives, it argued that families, and especially children, would benefit from having an educated mother. In a 1840 report on schooling in South Wales, Tremenheere argued that that there was a necessity for "industrial training of female children with reference to the careful and proper discharge of domestic duties" School inspection reports in the 1850s encouraged the teaching of home economics and needlework to girls. Under the Revised Code, schools could loose government funding if they did not teach girls sewing.

=== Conditions ===
The new network of state-funded schools were not always of a better quality than their predecessors. For instance, David Rowlands, a man born in 1836, remembered that his teacher at a school in Bodedern run by the National Society slept, read a newspaper and drank alcohol in lessons. Some people recalled their teachers fondly in later life; for instance, Evan Herber Evans wrote that his teacher in around the late 1830s would display the pupils' exam results to motivate them and that the school had given him "a taste for learning and knowledge". Teachers sometimes gave charitable assistance to poorer children paid for out of their own money. Some commentators in the mid-19th century described the schools of the period favourably.

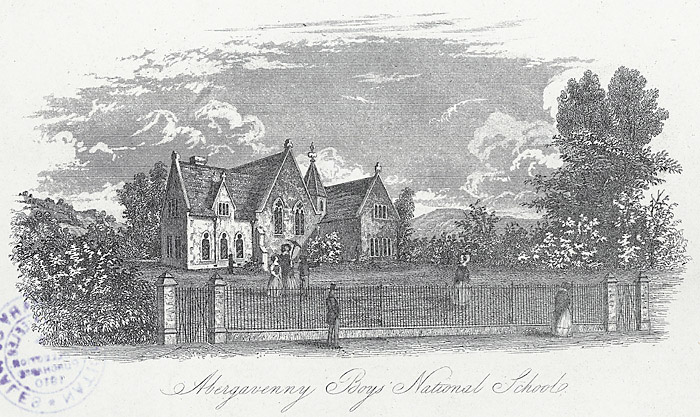
Abergavenny Boys National School (1865)

The 1847 report also commented on the unpleasant conditions in many schools. W. Carnero Harries, writing later about his school in Llanelli during the 1840s, said that teaching was conducted in a small room "with one low door, a small window, without any apparatus to open and close … The floor was of dark, damp earth; a low and rotten roof, leaking in torrents on a rainy day. In fact, it was nothing but an unhealthy and deadly hole". The school had rudimentary benches with no desks. A more professional approach developed towards the design of schools in the middle of the 19th century. Several books were published on the subject and the government created example plans for new school buildings. The many school buildings built in Wales during this period were influenced by this professionalisation and often reflected the Gothic revival style of architecture.

The ages of pupils could be varied; for instance, Robert Roberts remembered of his 50 classmates at a village school in Denbighshire during the 1840s that "we ranged from six to twenty and upwards; stalwart young farmers and grown up girls stood side by side with the small urchin just breeched". Of the pupils attending privately run schools in three towns in South Wales in 1847, including Dame schools focused on offering child-minding for the very young, roughly 30 per cent were under five, 46 per cent were five to nine years and 23 per cent were ten or older. Children often attended school for short, sporadic periods. Poor attendance and early withdrawal from school were considered significant problems by inspectors during the mid-19th century; child labour, health problems and poor weather all contributed to the issue.

Between 1857 and 1866, a prize-giving scheme was funded by industrialists in South Wales with the aim of encouraging parents to keep their children in school for longer; older pupils could apply for financial rewards of between £1 and £3 (Note: According to the Bank of England's model for measuring inflation, £3 in 1860 was the equivalent of roughly £300 in 2023.) if they met a certain academic level at an annual competition. The scheme only involved a few children and many prizes were won by lower-middle-class pupils who would often have stayed at school without the incentive. Tremenheere, a supporter of the scheme, wrote in 1859 that miners' children rarely participated as they usually left school at or before the age of ten. The scheme had other difficulties and quickly disappeared as industrialists lost interest in funding it.

=== Blue Books ===
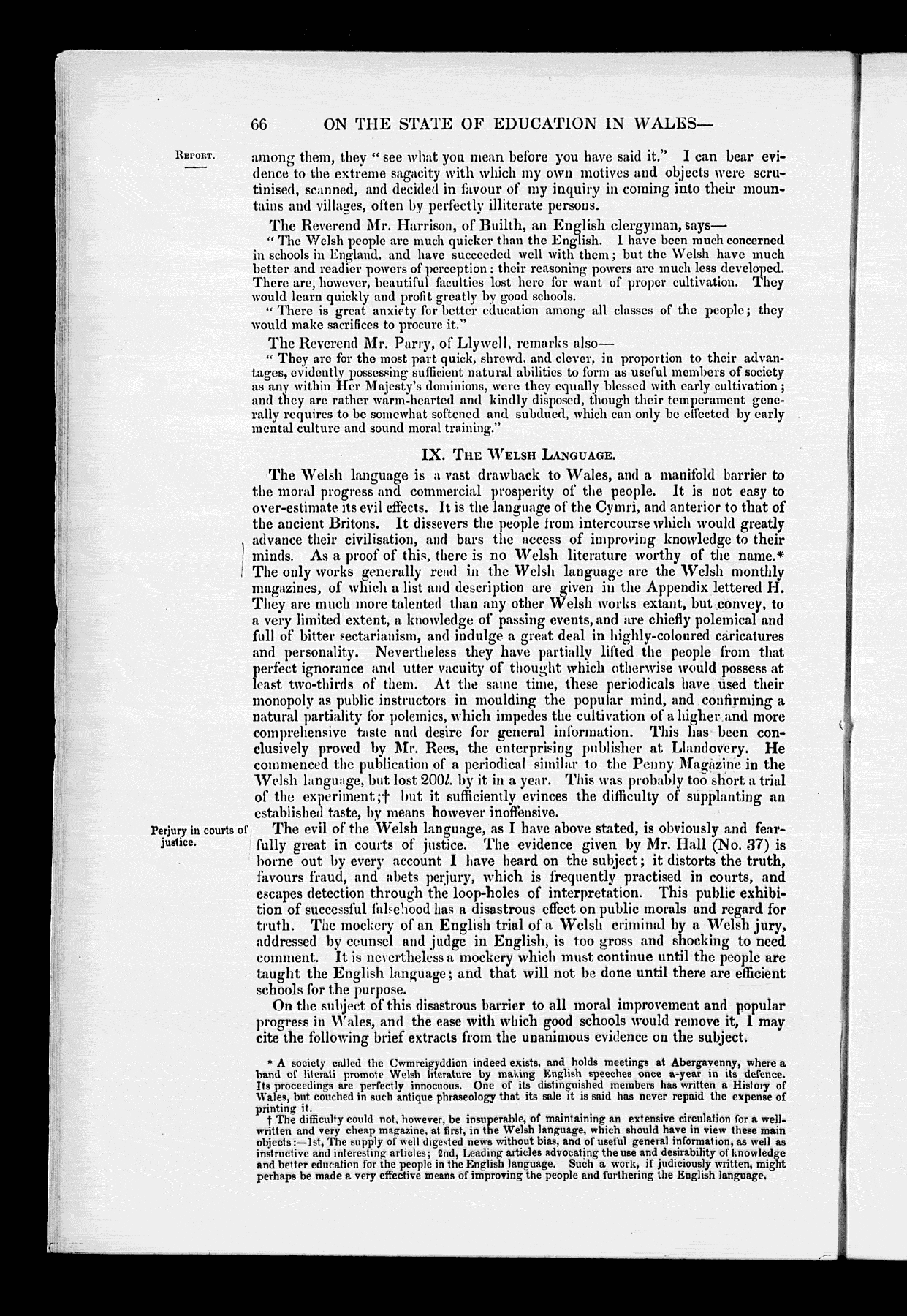
Start of a section focused on Welsh from the 1847 government report. It describes the language as "a vast drawback to Wales".

In the 1830s and 1840s the Welsh language became increasingly associated in the eyes of the government with the social unrest taking place in Wales. The government announced "an inquiry into the state of education, especially into the means afforded the labouring classes of acquiring a knowledge of the English language" in the early 1840s. The three commissioners were English and could not speak Welsh. The Welsh-speaking assistants they employed and the witnesses the enquiry spoke to were largely Anglicans; although Nonconformists formed the majority religious group in Wales by the middle of the 19th century.

The report, released in 1847, caused great offence in Wales because of its negative depiction of the Welsh language and the moral character of the Welsh people—although it complimented the Welsh population's desire for education, their willingness to make sacrifices to acquire it, as well as their knowledge of religion and mathematics. It was nicknamed Brad y Llyfrau Gleision (The Treason of the Blue Books). At the time Nonconformists generally interpreted the report as an English and Anglican attack on the Welsh, and some Anglican churchmen criticised its harsh tone.

Grigg describes its substance, apart from its insulting tone, as "a detailed picture of educational poverty". Jones and Roderick wrote that the educational aspects of the report's criticism were broadly reasonable. The inquiry noted problems such as low attendance, untrained teachers, insufficient school provision and the fact that most schoolchildren were not studying arithmetic. The two historians suggested that the writers of the report, who were young university graduates, might have misinterpreted problems that affected working people across Britain as specifically Welsh defects. They conclude that even though it had an "offensive tone, the 1847 report was a formidable document that recorded in great detail the level of schooling in Wales".

The report depicts the Welsh language as a negative influence limiting the potential of the Welsh population. Jones and Roderick argued that its attitude to Welsh was a reflection of the contemporary belief among the English middle classes that everyone in the British Empire needed to learn standard English, rather than being a deliberate expression of anti-Welsh sentiment. The regional dialects of the English working classes were also criticised in other educational reports. The report argued that much of the Welsh-speaking public was keen to learn English and that bilingualism in schools was the best way to teach it. The report was critical of schools which tried to teach English without using Welsh. For instance, the commissioner who investigated North Wales, Henry Vaughan Johnson, wrote about the difficulties experienced by children in the schools he visited;

Every book in the school is written in English; every word he [the pupil] speaks is to be spoken in English; every subject of instruction must be studied in English ... yet he is furnished with no single help for acquiring a knowledge of English ... The promoters of schools appear unconscious of the difficulty, and the teachers of the possibility of its removal.

=== Government and schools' approach to language ===
The British government never forbade the use of Welsh in schools; the state did not have a clear view on the Welsh language. Johnes believes that the CCE is likely to have shared the 1847 report's view that it was a hindrance to the Welsh population and their governance. The CCE gave little attention to the subject of language and English was assumed to be the medium of instruction. A feeling that it was beneficial for everyone in a nation state to speak a single language was common across Europe in this period and education was felt to be a non-violent method to achieve this. Johnes argues that the state expected that teaching children English would naturally lead to the decline of Welsh, but the state ultimately had limited control over education and schools were in English because that was what the Welsh population wanted.

Queen Victoria requested in 1849 that both Welsh and English should be taught at schools in Wales; the minister responsible for education, Henry Petty-Fitzmaurice, 3rd Marquess of Lansdowne, responded that both languages would be used. The government introduced the "Welsh paper" in 1850; this was a qualification in the Welsh language which was offered in teacher training colleges. Teachers who had gained it received an increased salary in areas where a knowledge of Welsh was deemed necessary. It was not popular with teachers and was ended in 1862. The 1862 Revised Code did not include Welsh as a grant-earning subject. Some historians have seen this as further undermining the position of Welsh in schools, but there is no evidence from the time that it decreased the language's use.

School inspectors were more aware of the linguistic issues faced by Welsh schools and their views on the subject were varied. For instance, HMI Matthew Arnold commented in 1853 that eventually "the difference of language between Wales and England will probably be effaced" and that this would be "an event which is socially and politically so desirable" for the Welsh population. These comments later became well known after being quoted in "Tynged yr Iaith" ('The Fate of the Language'), a radio lecture delivered by Saunders Lewis in 1962. Nevertheless, Arnold was only responsible for inspecting schools in Wales for a short time and supported the use of Welsh in schools to help Welsh-speaking children understand their lessons. HMI Harry Longueville Jones was strongly in favour of a bilingual school system and believed that there was a long-term future for the Welsh language; commenting that "English will penetrate rapidly to every fireside among our mountains; not to displace the ancient language of the country, but to illustrate and to aid it". However, Johnes suggests that Longueville Jones seems to have viewed the Welsh people as an exotic, primitive culture in need of protection and moral improvement, often writing about them in a paternalistic manner. His suggestion that the education system needed to be administered differently in Wales than in England was not viewed favourably by the CCE. Most school inspectors did not have strong views on the use of the Welsh language in education, and they had limited power to influence schools.

By the middle of the 19th century, government investigations indicated that many children were learning to read and write in English without being able to understand the words. Excluding Welsh from lessons was not an effective way of teaching English; children could not learn the meaning of words if they were not explained in the language they already knew and teachers could not check what their pupils understood. It is likely that teachers were using some Welsh. The 1847 government report indicated that 318 out of 1,657 day schools were using some Welsh in lessons. The statements made in government reports about the issue are sometimes contradictory. Johnes suggests that teachers may have been avoiding using Welsh on the days they were inspected in the belief that it would impress the visitors. Vocabulary was frequently taught through translation tests, which were sometimes turned into a game, though this was too limited to have much benefit.

Teachers were often people with some familiarity with the English language, but their English was sometimes limited; for instance, the Blue Books commissioners described having to speak to teachers through a translator. They might not know how to pronounce words in English. The use of teachers who could not speak Welsh was viewed as desirable by some of those who ran schools as it was felt to make the teaching of English more effective. It might also have been a necessity as there was a shortage of Welsh-speaking teachers. Contemporaries commented that the cultural divide between these teachers and local people could lead to tensions, undermining school attendance. The simple, repetitive structure of lessons could be helpful for solely English-speaking teachers and they were sometimes felt to be effective by school inspectors. They could use monitors or, after 1846, pupil teachers to help translate, but these were older children who might have had little knowledge of English.

Some teachers, especially the rising number of trained teachers, did make an effort to ensure that Welsh-speaking children understood their work and could learn a little English. Accounts of children being beaten for speaking Welsh became less common after 1850; the penalty was increasingly likely to be non-physical where the Welsh Not was still used. School inspectors and the Welsh section of the Newcastle Commission believed that some use of Welsh was necessary for teaching children English. Inspectors often showed leniency when examining children under the Revised Code in heavily Welsh-speaking areas. James Jones, a teacher working in Bala, published A Few Plain Hints and Suggestions on Teaching English in Welsh Country Schools (1864). Jones recommended the use of some Welsh to help children learn English, though he felt this should be reduced as pupils grew older and their English improved. He was against the idea of conducting teaching in Welsh with English taught as a subject, feeling this would not give Welsh-speaking children enough time to practise English. He described his ideas as "a mean between the two extremes" of lessons conducted solely in English on the one hand and ones conducted mainly in Welsh on the other. It is unclear how much influence the book had, but it was recommended in a school inspection report from 1866.

The teaching of English was becoming easier in industrial areas of eastern Wales as migration meant that more children were either from English-speaking households or had playmates from such homes. George Borrow, a travel writer who visited Bedwas, Glamorgan, in 1854 commented that the local children usually spoke in English. A girl told him that she could speak some Welsh but was not fluent. Still, complaints by teachers about Welsh-speaking children struggling with English had not disappeared entirely in these areas by 1870. A teacher working in Rhymney, Monmouthshire, wrote in the school's records in 1868, "Find the Welsh language a hinderance to their progress in English as it is Welsh in the home, in society, and in the chapel." Welsh remained the dominant language in much of western and rural Wales, but factors such as trade, tourism and consumerism began to make English more familiar there.

=== Private, ragged, Sunday and works schools ===
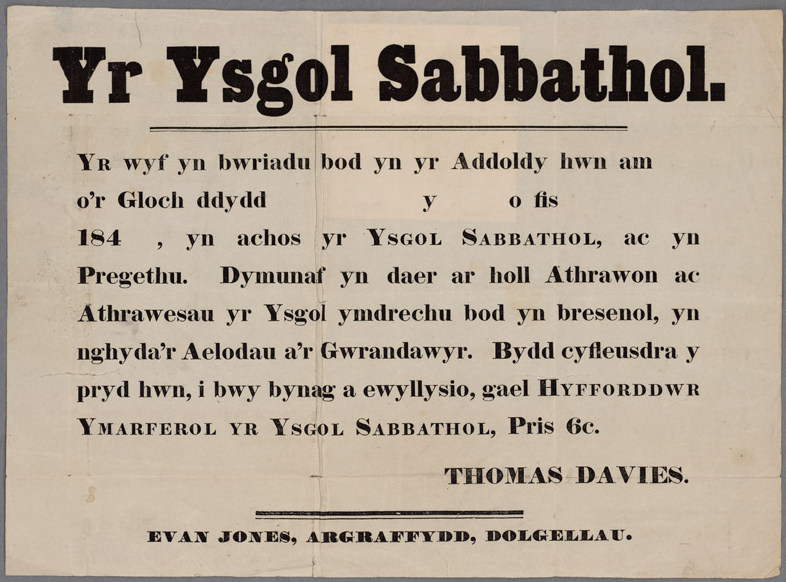
Welsh language poster announcing a Sunday school (c. 1840) (Note: The text means "The Sabbath School. I intend to be at this place of worship at ___ o’clock on the ___ day of the month of ___ 184__, for the purpose of the Sabbath School and preaching. I earnestly desire all the Teachers and the Scholars of the School to strive to be present, along with the Members and the Listeners. There will be an opportunity at this time, for anyone who wishes, to obtain the Practical Guide for the Sabbath School, Price 6d. - THOMAS DAVIES. - EVAN JONES, PRINTER, DOLGELLAU.")

In a census of education conducted in 1851, 2,771 Sunday schools were listed in Wales with 269,378 pupils. Across England and Wales, about three quarters of working-class children between five and fifteen years were attending Sunday school. Sunday schools in Wales had a high rate of attendance. They tended to teach in Welsh; an 1847 government report stated that 71 per cent of Sunday schools in North Wales were taught in Welsh and 21 per cent were bilingual. They took place in whatever buildings were available and the teacher could be anybody with some knowledge. Lessons typically focused on religion and Welsh reading; some Sunday schools also taught English, music and general knowledge. Sunday school could be a supplement to day school or a child's only experience of education. Historians have described these schools as controlled by ordinary people and a focus of Welsh identity during this period. A contemporary article in The Morning Chronicle argued that Sunday schools in Merthyr Tydfil were a reaction to a lack of weekday schooling in the area. Research on the situation in England suggested this was partially the case, but that Sunday schools could not make up for the illiteracy caused by a lack of other schooling.

In Wales the Anglican schools were reported to be poorly attended, as Nonconformists preferred private schools—although the proportion of day school pupils at private schools fell in Wales from 58 per cent in 1833 to 26 per cent in 1851. Officials and middle class opinion was critical of private schools aimed at the working classes, but Grigg argued that they maintained much appeal among their intended market. Though their facilities were poorer than state-funded schools, they offered a familiar environment for children, were more responsive to the desires of parents and often offered a decent standard of basic instruction. The 1847 government report indicated that most private schools taught in English; a minority were recorded as teaching in both Welsh and English. The report suggested that teachers had varying levels of ability in English. It stated that parents appeared satisfied with their children's progress in the language. Some teachers, who were veterans of the Napoleonic Wars, also taught French.

Another form of elementary education available in this period were works schools run by industrialists for the education of the children of their workers. Only one of these schools existed at the start of the century and their numbers had gradually increased over the next forty years. Provision expanded sharply in the middle decades of the 19th century. Works schools benefited from factory owner's financial support and sometimes compulsory contributions from employees; they tended to have better facilities than other working-class schools but were undermined by the overcrowding and high demand for child labour in industrial areas. Most schools that were recorded in 1847 as teaching subjects beyond the three r's and religion were works schools associated with the smelting industry. Works schools were much less common in industrial areas of North Wales than the South; Leslie Wynne Evans, a historian of the subject, suggests this may have been due to the voluntary societies being quicker to provide schools in the North. In 1863, a visitor to Llynfi Ironworks School, which had 800 pupils, recorded that:

I remember a long, wide room, sloping down gradually to the dais at the bottom, where the head-teacher ruled. Discipline was unduly harsh. The children were very mixed—Welsh, English and Irish. Several children were barefooted and pale. The curriculum was rather stereotyped and scanty. Reading, writing and arithmetic mostly. Very little history, and geography consisted of map-drawing and remembering names.

Ragged schools were established in Wales between the 1840s and the 1870s though the exact number is unclear. They were typically founded in poorer urban areas and intended for children who were unable to attend other elementary schools due to their poverty. Supporters of ragged schools were driven by a humanitarian desire to help the poor and the concerns about their behaviour which were common at the time. The number of Irish migrants in Wales increased sharply following the Irish famine and they were viewed in an especially unfavourable light — believed to be more prone to crime and less hard-working than the British poor. For instance, in 1852, the Carmarthen Journal commented that Irish migrants were a "serious evil ... spreading wretchedness, squalor and filth wherever they go". The ragged schools taught many children of Irish descent and one in Merthyr Tydfil was for Irish Catholics only. Ragged schools were controversial with some arguing that they undermined parents' responsibility for children's upkeep.

A ragged school in Cardiff was attended by 299 pupils in 1853; this group included 130 children of labourers and 32 orphans. Examples of the individual children who attended ragged schools in Wrexham included; a poorly dressed girl from a family of beggars and a boy whose mother had been struggling to earn a living through repairing shoes since his father enlisted in the Crimean War. The curriculum usually consisted of the three R's and practical skills. Lessons were conducted in English which Grigg indicates would not have been as issue for most pupils. Ragged schools offered material assistance to children (e.g. food), leisure activities and social services. (Note: For instance, a ragged school in Wrexham organised visits to children's homes along with evening classes in domestic skills and religion for their mothers. Another in Swansea established a savings scheme and recreational facilities.) Ragged schools did not aim to meet the same academic level as other schools; there is little evidence of them allowing children to achieve social mobility, but they may have helped to reduce illiteracy among the poorest sections of the population.

=== Secondary education ===
Secondary education provision during this period was very limited in Wales. The situation was much worse than in England, which was itself not particularly impressive by international standards. In the 1850s HMI Harry Longueville Jones argued for the creation of evening schools to teach maritime skills, given that many boys became sailors after leaving school. Revd Rhys Gwesyn Jones said, in a lecture published in 1866, that education in domestic skills should be offered to working young women. He suggested that training women to be better at housework would reduce alcohol use among men, as it would make them more inclined to spend their free time at home rather than in public houses.

==== Boys ====
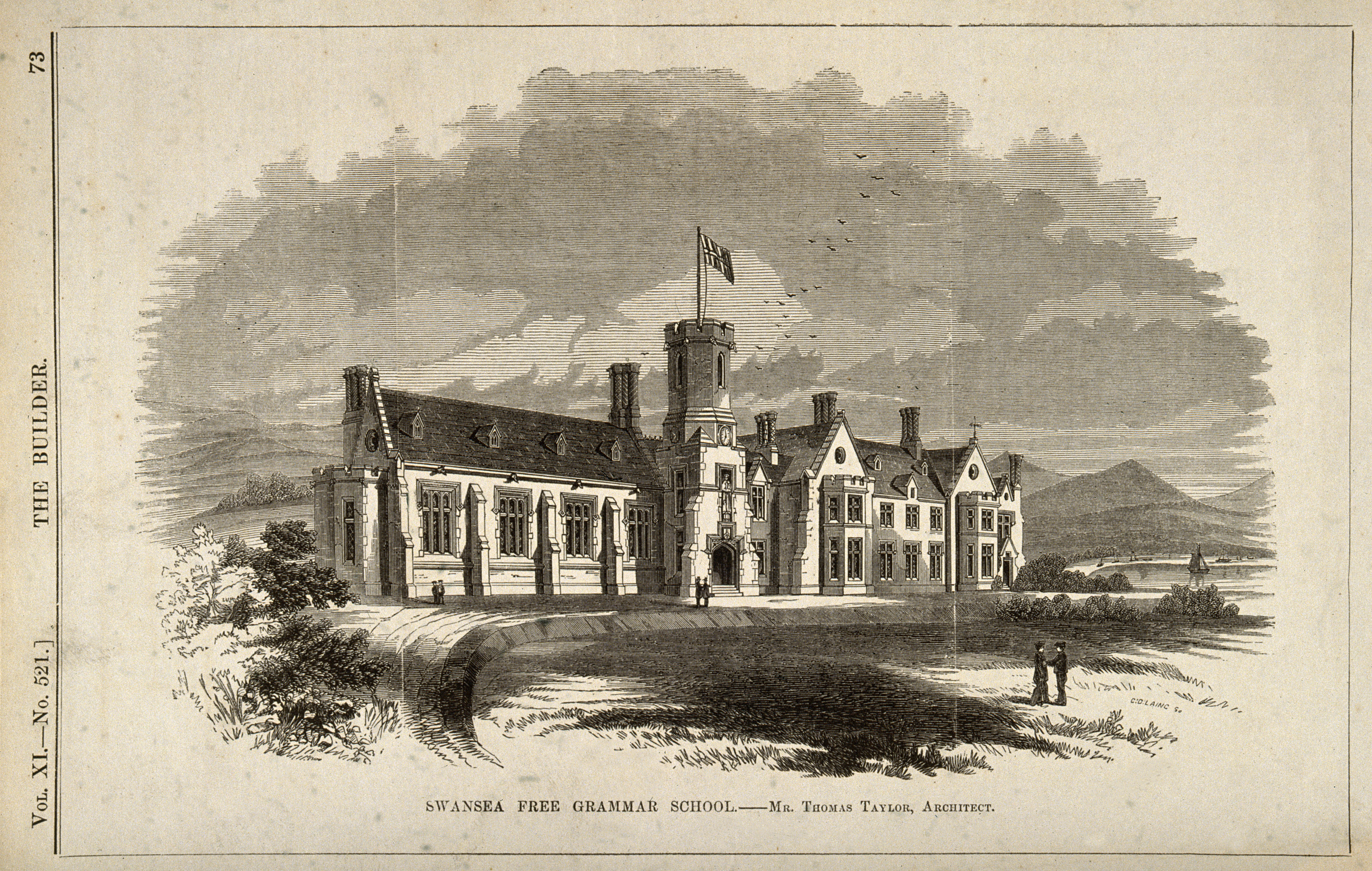
Engraving of Swansea Free Grammar School by Charles D. Laing, designed by Thomas Taylor (1853)

Across the UK, the norm was for younger middle-class boys to be educated at home by their mothers. Only a minority of families at this social level could afford governesses. Lessons often began at around three years. The socialisation of young boys' reflected their parents ambitions for them. They were usually sent to school at seven years.

The Taunton Commission in 1868 noted that twenty towns in Wales, with an average population of 11,000, lacked grammar schools. The commission identified 28 boys' grammar schools with combined pupil numbers of 1,100. These schools tended to be located in areas that had once been focuses of the Welsh economy but were now far from the new population centres. As the aristocracy and the new industrial elite tended to employ tutors or send their sons to the English public schools, pupils were mainly the sons of the same middle-class group that had attended them since the 16th century; the upper-middle classes drifted towards English boarding schools. 24 of the 28 were classified as giving classical or semi-classical education, which seemed outdated to parents of many potential pupils in a changed economy. The fees were too high for many middle-class households, and Nonconformists saw the schools as being under Anglican influence.

Endowments often allowed for teaching of non-classical subjects or could be legally changed to do so; most grammar schools in Wales were teaching some other subjects alongside the classics by the 1860s. The non-classical subjects widely taught were English, mathematics, French, history and geography. Less widely taught subjects included physical education, science and in one case Welsh. Some grammar schools were rebuilt in the middle of the 19th century.

There were several private secondary schools for boys. Little information about these schools exists, they were often small and short-lived, conducted in homes or other buildings not originally intended to be schools. Some of these schools taught a wide curriculum. The subjects taught at a private boys' school in Merthyr included classics, mathematics, philosophy, history, geography, natural history and physiology. Most were more restricted.

==== Girls ====
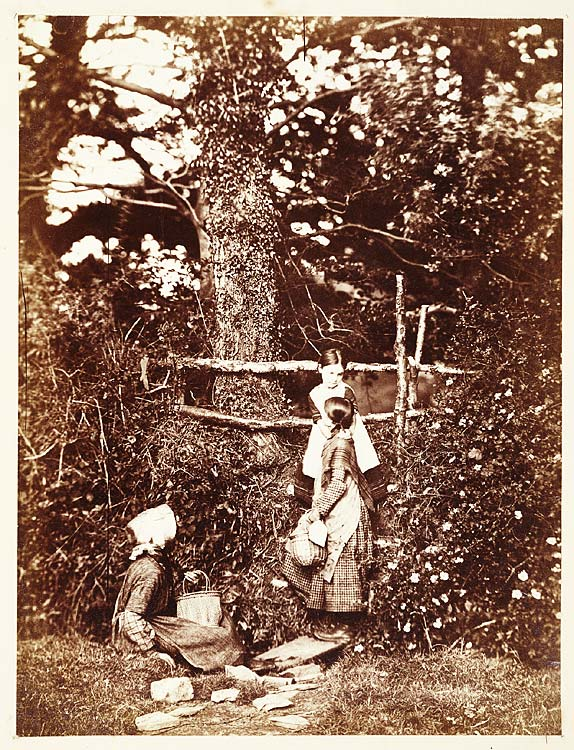
Girls receiving an art lesson in Swansea, photographed by John Dillwyn Llewelyn (1856)

Middle-class girls generally received their entire education at home. Teaching often focused on memorising information. Moral education was also considered important; girls learnt virtues such as kindness. Little advice was available about how to teach children and the education given by mothers or governesses could be limited. Many middle-class women found their education inadequate in adult life, for instance, struggling with simple arithmetic.

The National Commercial Directory (1835) by Pigot & Co noted 96 private boarding schools in Wales. All the schools were single sex and a clear majority were for girls — 60 were located in South Wales. English boarding schools for girls also received Welsh pupils. The usual curriculum for girls focused on accomplishments; the study of the English language, modern languages and artistic subjects. Some girls' schools employed a French woman to teach her language and expected the pupils to only speak French for part of the week. Fees were higher than at boys' schools, families might also be charged an additional fee for their daughters to study certain subjects. Thus, girls were often educated at home into their teenage years and then sent to school for a short period. The Taunton Commission noted an apathy about their daughters' education among many middle-class parents. The role of a middle-class woman in the Victorian era was to act as a supportive figure for her family. The commission argued that girls' schools neglected their pupils intellectual development and future responsibilities in the family home, commenting;

In many cases, farmers' daughters who know hardly any history or even spelling, and who have only 6 or 9 months in which to finish their education, learn music and that though there may be no instrument at their homes on which they can practise. In the higher class schools, a great deal of time is usually devoted to it, from 1 to 2 hours a day being spent thus, and sometimes even more, if singing be also learnt.

The Howell Foundation had established two girls' schools in 1860 which were located in Denbigh and Llandaff. The schools were discussed by the Taunton Commission. It described them as influenced by the Anglican faith but compromising with the religious views of pupils from Nonconformist families. The schools admitted some non-fee-paying orphans and varied fees based on other pupils' economic backgrounds. However, the commission commented that the school in Llandaff was aimed at "gentlewoman, and the governors ... [are reluctant to admit] one who is not such by birth" and the pupils at the other school were typically from wealthier households. It described the schools' buildings and their teaching of accomplishments as of a good quality. However, the commission considered the schools to have some limitations compared to other expensive girls schools; having larger class sizes and lacking native French speakers to teach the language. An equivalent girls' school aimed at Nonconformists would not be founded until 1878.

== Higher education ==
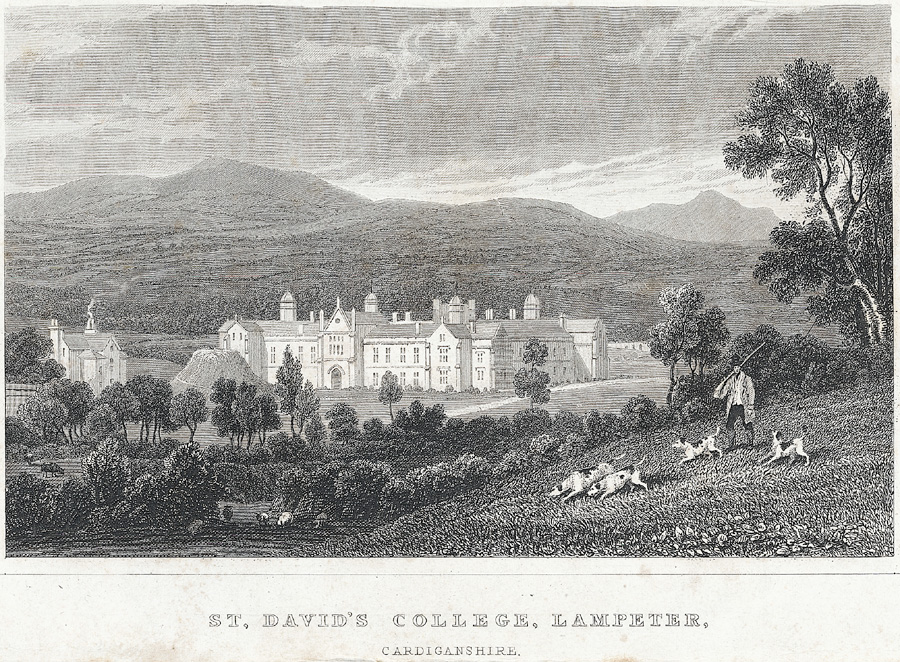
Engraving of St David's College, Lampeter (1830)

Oxford and Cambridge Universities fell into decline in the 18th century with a curriculum that had evolved little since medieval times, little academic focus, declining numbers and fewer opportunities for poorer students. A new form of senior-level education was also established. This originated from religious oppression, beginning in the Cavalier parliament in 1662, which led to several clergy members being ejected and impoverished, some of whom established academies for dissenters who had been prevented by the repression from going to the universities. More than 20 of these institutions were established across England and Wales. The academies were originally established mainly to train future dissenter ministers, but they also attracted Anglicans who saw them as being of a better standard than universities. They taught a variety of subjects over four years of study including "classics, logic, Hebrew, mathematics, natural sciences, modern languages and medicine". The best-known example in Wales was the Presbyterian Academy in Brynllywarch which later moved to Carmarthen. An indication of the kind of instruction given in the academy can be seen in guidance issued by the Presbyterian denominational board which contributed to the academy financially. In 1725 it warned prospective Presbyterian ministers that they would not receive employment:

unless it appears upon examination that they can render into English any paragraph of Tully's offices... that they read Psalm in Hebrew, translate into Latin any part of the Greek Testament... give a satisfactory account of their knowledge in the several sciences they studied at the Academy and draw up a thesis upon any question that will be proposed to them in Latin...

The gentry became more culturally distant from the rest of the Welsh population in the 18th century. Some estates were inherited by English or Scottish relatives of previous owners. The remaining upper classes increasingly spoke English as their first language, stayed Anglican while the rest of society moved towards Nonconformity and spent much of their time in London. Though there seems to have been a feeling of belonging to Wales among this group, Welsh literature in English during this period often showed firm support for the British Government while emphasising a separate sense of Welsh cultural identity. Some of the social elite were involved in amateur research into the history and culture of Wales, though not all of it was accurate. The Society of Ancient Britons was the earliest Welsh organisation in London founded in 1714. It was a philanthropic group which activities included establishing a charity school for the children of Welsh people in London.

The dissenter academies evolved into the theological colleges of the 19th century which were associated with Nonconformists. Witnesses to the Aberdare Committee in 1880 noted that many of the colleges' pupils were from the "common people" paying "little or nothing for their support". Frequently men would receive a limited education as children and spend years in working class jobs, initially taking up preaching in their spare time, before studying in a theological college. Some graduates found work in occupations outside the ministry. The colleges could act as a stepping stone to higher education. With Oxford and Cambridge still maintaining a religious test until 1871, options for Nonconformists included Scottish universities and affiliate college schemes run by the University of London. St David's College in Lampeter was founded in 1827 to educate future Anglican clergy. It was the first degree-issuing institution in Wales.

== Legacy ==
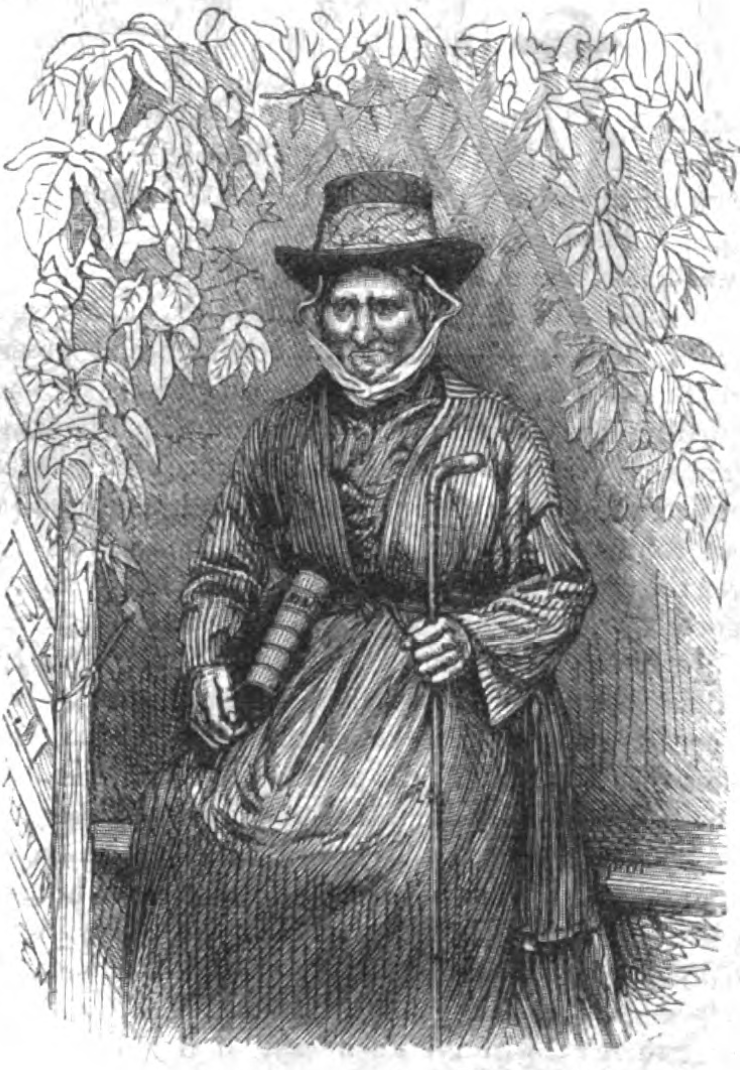
Engraving of Mary Jones holding her Bible based on a photograph, published in Sunday at Home (1878)

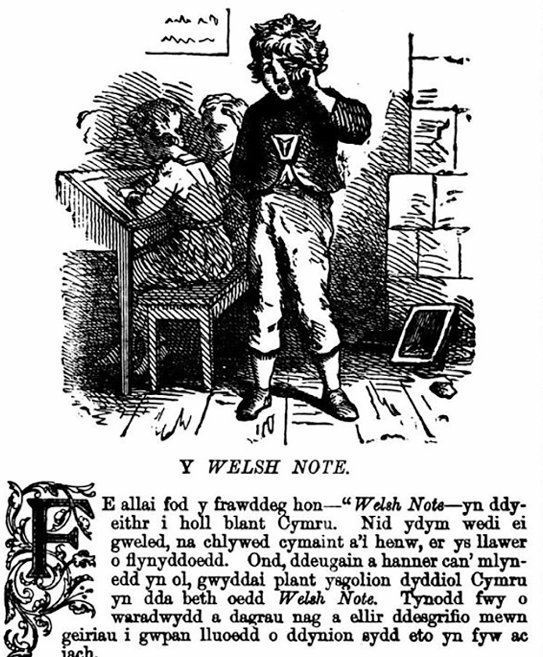
Y Welsh Note (The Welsh Note), engraving published in a Welsh language youth magazine, Trysorfa y Plant (A Children's Treasury, 1879) (Note: The text means "The phrase – Welsh Note – might be unfamiliar to all the children of Wales. We have not seen nor heard so much as its name for many years. But forty and fifty years ago, the children of the day schools of Wales knew well what the Welsh Note was. It drew more reproaches and tears than can be described in words to many men who are still alive and well.")

Circulating and Sunday schools in the 18th century allowed many Welsh people to learn to read and develop a greater knowledge of religion than their counterparts in England. Although people in the 18th century saw them as a response to religious concerns, these educational experiments became a theme of Welsh nationalism in the 19th century. The best-known founder of Sunday schools in Wales, Thomas Charles, came to be seen as a Welsh hero. A popular story was that Charles fell ill while travelling but recovered when his friends prayed for him to be given more time to carry on his work, though there is little evidence for this. Another story was that of Mary Jones, a teenaged girl who was said to have walked 25 miles in 1800 to get her own copy of the Bible from Charles, inspiring the creation of the British and Foreign Bible Society. This latter story is believed by historians to have been largely accurate, and remained popular into the 20th century.

Johnes suggested that contemporary investigations tended to focus on the problems schools faced rather than their successes. He commented that schools were improving in the middle of the 19th century with help from the state. In Wales, at the end of the 1860s, there were school places for 60 per cent of school-aged children, but with substantial geographical variations. In Merthyr Tydfil places were available for only 22 per cent. Research by the Newcastle Commission in 1861 indicated that a large majority of a sample of Welsh schoolchildren over the age of ten had some knowledge of English, many were described as speaking English well, though it is unclear how this was defined. Longueville Jones felt that some children were quickly learning English and a few pupils of this era recalled later in life that their schooling had been useful to them. Johnes argued that teaching was too restricted to effectively introduce a new language, making lessons tedious and unsuccessful. Welsh-speakers often quickly forgot the English they had learnt at school in areas where it was rarely used in everyday life.

In the 1860s there was growing political pressure in England and Wales for an intervention in the elementary education system. It appeared that education provision through the voluntary societies was inadequate for a growing population. Meanwhile, there were concerns that rapidly industrialising France and Prussia, which had state education systems, were a threat to Britain's status as the world's most industrialised country. The Second Reform Act, which extended the franchise to a wider cross-section of the male population, led to worries about ignorant voters making unwise decisions. Elsewhere the American Civil War and Austro-Prussian War were won by powers with developed state education systems. In Wales, political pressure for change took the form of the Educational Alliance Society founded in 1870. The 1870 Elementary Education Act began the process of establishing a system of universal elementary education in the late 19th century.

Adults who experienced the Welsh Not as children recalled it with differing emotions, including anger, indifference and humour. In the late 19th and early 20th centuries several accounts were published of this method of discipline, which described it as having been used in the relatively recent past. Some writers in this period saw the Welsh Not as something imposed on Wales by England or the British government with the aim of destroying the Welsh language; others disagreed, often seeing it as a result of Welsh people's desire to learn English. The best-selling novel How Green Was My Valley (1939) by Richard Llewellyn includes an emotive description of the practice, which Johnes considers one of the most influential depictions of the punishment:

About her neck a piece of new cord, and from the cord, a board that hung to her shins and cut her as she walked. Chalked on the board ... I must not speak Welsh in school ... And the board dragged her down, for she was small, an infant, and the cord rasped the flesh of her neck, and there were marks upon her shins where the edge of the board had cut. Loud she cried ... and in her eyes the big tears of a child who is hurt, and has shame, and is frightened.

Johnes argues that there is little evidence to suggest that the Welsh Not caused the decline of Welsh. A large majority of children were not attending day school when it was most common and schools that attempted to completely exclude Welsh tended to be ineffective at teaching English. The punishment continues to be well known in Wales. The Welsh Not has often been discussed in the media usually with an emphasis on its cruelty. It has also featured in school teaching materials and been linked to political debates. It is sometimes incorrectly portrayed as a policy introduced by the British government.

== Bibliography ==
=== Websites and journals ===
- Greaves, Richard L. (3 January 2008). "Gouge, Thomas (1605–1681)". Oxford Dictionary of National Biography.
- Grigg, Russell (2002). "The Origins and Growth of Ragged Schools in Wales, 1847- c. 1900". History of Education Quarterly. 31 (3): 227–243. doi:10.1080/00467600210122603. ISSN 0046-760X.
- Grigg, Russell (2005). "'Nurseries of Ignorance'? Private Adventure and Dame Schools for the Working Classes in Nineteenth-Century Wales". History of Education. 34 (3): 243–262. doi:10.1080/00467600500065126. ISSN 0046-760X – via Taylor & Francis.
- James, David C.; Davies, Brian (4 May 2017). "Patterns of and Influences on Elementary School Attendance in Early Victorian Industrial Monmouthshire 1839–1865". History of Education. 46 (3): 290–305. doi:10.1080/0046760X.2016.1193226. ISSN 0046-760X.
- Jones, Gareth Elwyn (December 2006). "Education and Nationhood in Wales: An Historiographical Analysis". Journal of Educational Administration and History. 38 (3): 263–277. doi:10.1080/00220620600984313. ISSN 0022-0620.
- Snell, K. (1 August 1999). "The Sunday-School Movement in England and Wales: Child Labour, Denominational Control and Working-Class Culture". Past & Present (164): 122–168. doi:10.1093/past/164.1.122. ISSN 0031-2746. PMID 22049588.

=== Books ===
- Borrow, George (1911). Wild Wales: Its People, Language and Scenery (5th ed.). Hazell, Watson and Viney.
- Evans, Leslie Wynne (1971). Education in Industrial Wales 1700–1900. Avalon Books. ISBN 9780902294028.
- Evans, W. Gareth (1990). Education and Female Emancipation: the Welsh Experience, 1847-1914. University of Wales Press. ISBN 9780708310793.
- Flanders, Judith (2004). The Victorian House: Domestic Life from Childbirth to Deathbed. Harper Perennial. ISBN 9780007131891.
- Higginbotham, Peter (2012). The Workhouse Encyclopedia. The History Press. ISBN 9780752477190.
- Johnes, Martin (2024). Welsh Not: Elementary Education and the Anglicisation of Nineteenth-Century Wales (PDF). University of Wales Press. ISBN 9781837721818.
- Jones, Gareth Elwyn; Roderick, Gordon Wynne (2003). History of Education in Wales. University of Wales Press. ISBN 9780708318089.
- Jones, James (1864). A Few Plain Hints and Suggestions on Teaching English in Welsh Country Schools. R. Saunderson.
- Keane, Ann; Egen, David; Grigg, Russell; Roy, James; Morgen, Alun; Norris, Barry; Williams, Sian Rhiannon (2022). Watchdogs or Visionaries? Perspectives on the History of the Education Inspectorate in Wales. University of Wales Press. ISBN 9781786839404.
- May, Trevor (1994). The Victorian Schoolroom. Shire Publications. ISBN 9780747802433.
- Mitchell, Sally (2011). Victorian Britain: An Encyclopedia. Routledge. ISBN 9780415669726.
- Prescott, Sarah (2020). Eighteenth Century Writing from Wales: Bards and Britons. Writing Wales in English (1st ed.). Cardiff: University of Wales Press. ISBN 9781786837233.
- Seaborne, Malcolm (1992). Schools in Wales 1500–1900: A Social and Architectural History. Gee and Son. ISBN 9780707402222.
- Stephens, T. B. (1998). Education in Britain, 1750–1914. Palgrave Macmillan. ISBN 9780333605127.
