= Elen Egryn =

Welsh poet

- Born: Elinor Evans; November 12, 1807 Llanegryn, Merionethshire, Wales
- Died: April 29, 1876 (aged 68) Chester, Cheshire, England
- Language: Welsh
- Subject: Bereavement, friendship, exile, depression
- Notable works: Telyn Egryn

Elen Egryn, the pen name of Elinor/Ellin/Ellen Evans (1807–1876), was a Welsh poet. She was the first woman to have a book published in the Welsh language.

== Biography ==
Baptised as Elinor Evans, Elen Egryn was the daughter of John Evans, a village schoolmaster, and his wife Rebecca (née Vincent). She was born and raised in the village of Llanegryn in Merionethshire, where she learned to write poetry as a child. She had moved to Liverpool by 1840 but soon returned to Machynlleth, not far from her home village. In 1850, her volume of poetry Telyn Egryn (Welsh for 'Egryn's harp') went to press in Dolgellau. The volume was edited and published by the Rev. William Rees ('Gwilym Hiraethog'), whose daughter Winifred had married Elen's brother William. It was dedicated to Augusta Hall, Baroness Llanover.

Although Elen did not receive the same degree of attention as contemporary male poets, her work is considered to be a milestone in the history of women's literature in Wales. It presents a broad range of poetry covering bereavement, friendship, exile and depression, purposefully invoking an impression of the high moral standards enjoyed by Welsh women. Her poetry is closer to the work of 18th-century poets than to that of the Victorian poets who followed her in that she employed a level of language rooted in the pre-medieval period.

Also in 1850, in reaction to the publication of the Reports of the Commissioners of Inquiry into the state of education in Wales which severely criticized the loose morals and behaviour of Welsh women, Evan Jones published Y Gymraes (The Welsh Woman) which set out to defend the high principles of Welsh women. Elen Egryn contributed a poetic introduction to the first issue, in which she called for women to rise 'goruwch gwarth a dirmyg cas' ('above shame and hateful mockery').

Elen died at her brother's house in Chester on 29 April 1876 and was buried in Overleigh Cemetery.

== Works ==
- Egryn, Elen (1850). Rees, W. (ed.). Telyn Egryn: neu Gyfansoddiadau Awenyddol Miss Ellin Evans, (Elen Egryn,) o Lanegryn (in Welsh). Dolgellau: Evan Jones.
- Egryn, Elen (1998). Telyn Egryn. Honno. ISBN 978-1-870206-30-3.

== See also ==
- Treachery of the Blue Books
