= History of education in Wales before 1701 =

History of education in Wales
- Antiquity–1700
1701–1870

Access to academic learning was restricted in Wales before 1701—though interest and availability did increase over the centuries—women and peasants were largely excluded from formal education.

Little evidence of formal education dates from the Roman period. Formal education was restricted largely to the clergy throughout most of the Middle Ages; though by late in the period it had expanded to the wider social elite. Grammar schools increasingly educated boys from commercial families in the early modern period. Most people remained illiterate and few options existed for peasant children to be educated; some experiments in educating a wider group of children took place in the second half of the 17th century. No higher education was available in Wales during this period; some Welshmen studied at universities in England or continental Europe. Women and girls were excluded from grammar schools and universities.

== Schooling ==
=== Roman and medieval eras ===
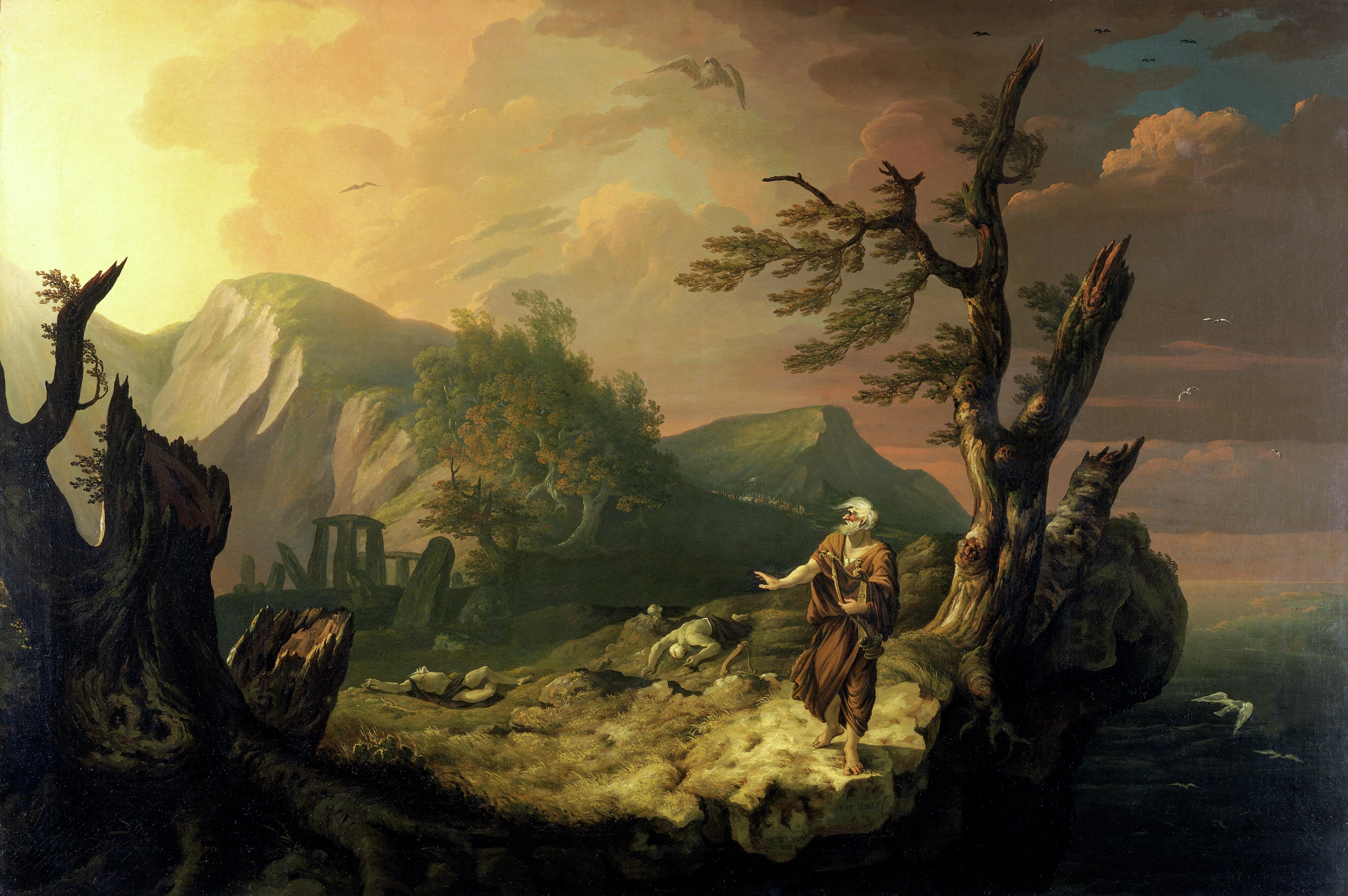
The Bard, a romanticised depiction of a travelling bard by Thomas Jones (1774)

The Roman province of Britannia (which included modern-day Wales) is generally considered to have had relatively low levels of literacy, by the standards of the Roman Empire, and there is little record of formal education. Writing tablets have been recovered from modern-day Caerleon, Newport, which was a Roman military fort. In the period after the Roman withdrawal from Great Britain, literacy in what is today Wales was largely restricted to the clergy. They were educated in monastic settlements, which were centres of learning. Saint Illtud established one at Llantwit Major, which was particularly known for its scholarship. For most people, the wide range of skills and knowledge needed for their work was passed orally from one generation to the next. Bards played a significant role in maintaining cultural memory.

Throughout much of the Middle Ages, even the highest-ranking members of the lay population often lacked formal education, though this steadily changed. Towards the end of the period, the growth of towns and the increased use of writing in the justice system led to more need for bureaucracy. Meanwhile, the skills needed for many trades were becoming increasingly complex, and the vocational education of the period—seven-year apprenticeships—was controlled by the guilds. Aristocratic children could receive their education through private tuition, but those aiming for a career in the Church would usually attend grammar schools, which were generally linked to cathedrals. These schools gave a classical education based on the trivium and the quadrivium. The seven subjects of study were grammar, dialectic/rhetoric, arithmetic, geometry, music and astronomy. The Welsh elite's prospects for education were harmed by the economic impact of the Black Death, and by Welshmen being prohibited from working for the government due to the Glyndŵr rebellion. There was a steady expansion throughout the rest of the 15th century as the economy and status of Welshmen recovered. There was also a growing appreciation of the value of formal education and an increasing demand for it among wealthier landowners. However, the growth of formal education was slower in Wales than in England. In Wales, formal education remained almost entirely dominated by the Church until after 1500.

=== 16th and 17th centuries ===
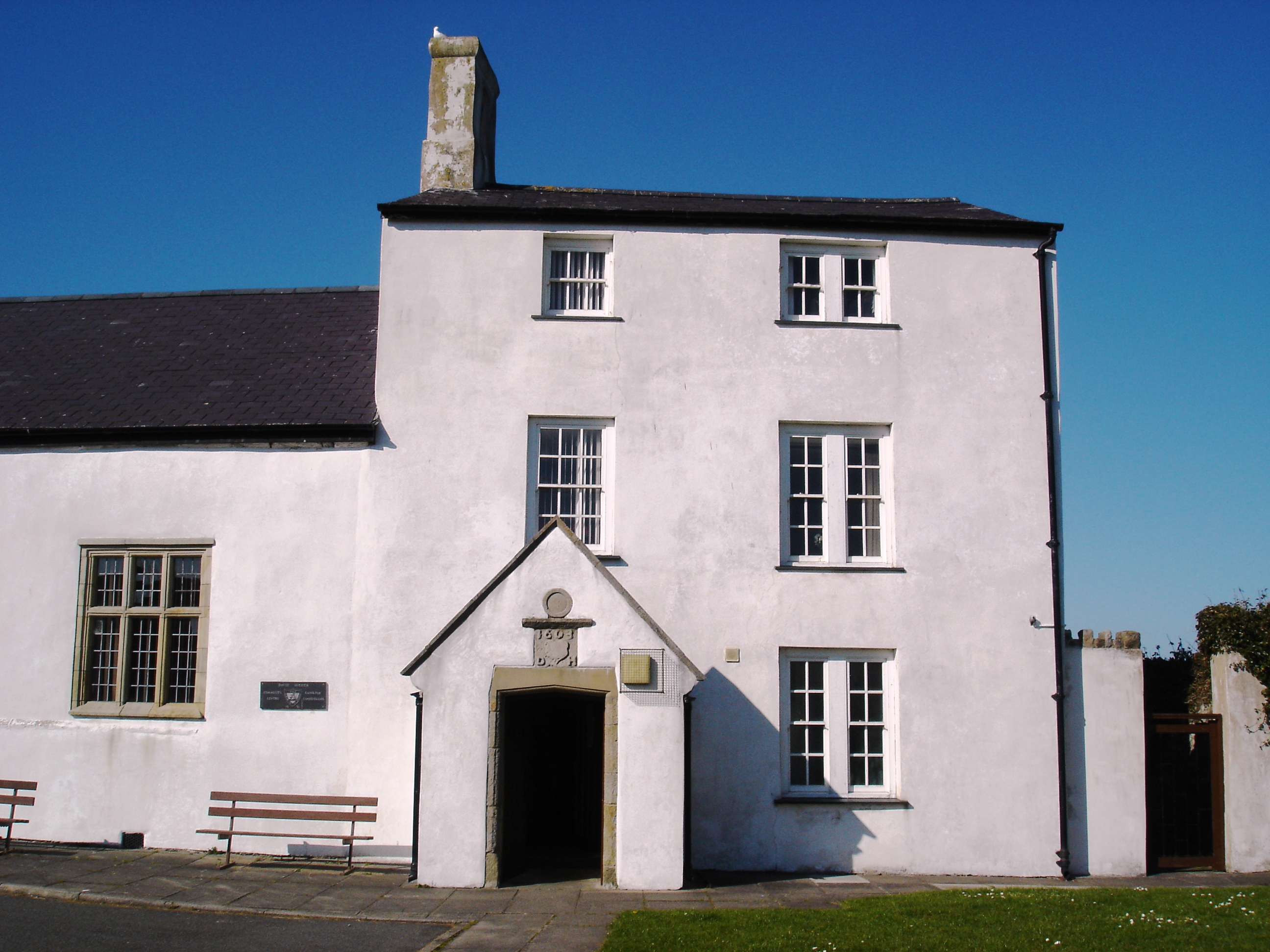
Original building of Beaumaris Grammar School on the Isle of Anglesey

According to historians Gareth Elwyn Jones and Gordon Wynne Roderick, the 16th century saw a growth in demand for formal education among "the middling sort of people—merchants, professional people, shopkeepers, freeholders, skilled craftsmen and lesser landowners". They wrote that this was a result of a more stable social situation, greater respect for and practical need for education, along with the Laws in Wales Acts, which made Wales a part of the Kingdom of England (Note: The Principality of Wales and Welsh Marches, the two territories that had previously existed in Wales, had both been under differing forms of governance by the English crown since the conquest of Wales by Edward I.) and created a more developed system of local government. In the 16th and 17th centuries, several new grammar schools were established to cater to this demand. Often, schools did not have purpose-built buildings but used other facilities such as churches. When schoolhouses were built, there was little sense of schools being their own category of building, and they tended to resemble the residential houses of the time. Teaching was always conducted in a single room, and the norm was only one schoolmaster. Schools frequently included accommodation for the master, usher (assistant teacher) and sometimes boarding pupils. There was at least one example in Wales of a grammar school including a field for boys to play.

The grammar schools were all boys' schools. They catered to a varied age range, sometimes as wide as from 8 to 19 years. Some of the schools offered lessons in basic literacy to the newest pupils, others expected that skill to be acquired before boys started. The pupil numbers were generally fairly low, ranging from about twenty to 120 at the largest school in Ruthin. The emphasis of instruction was on Latin and less often Ancient Greek; the aim being for boys to study the literature of the ancient world. The Renaissance ideal of a wider curriculum had little practical effect on schools; if anything teaching became narrower, with more emphasis on grammar and literature taught through recitation and dictation. There was some criticism of this approach at the time, but it had next to no practical effect. The birch was used to punish both bad behaviour and poor academic progress; the school in Ruthin is known to have forbid hitting boys on the face or ears. Fees were usually expected. Grammar schools were frequently required by their original endowments to provide some free places, but the cost of materials needed for lessons restricted the boys who could take them up. The upper end of the gentry often sent their sons to more prestigious grammar schools in England. The increasing number of grammar schools provided a major expansion in education availability for boys.

Alongside the grammar schools, there were a small number of schools providing elementary education. For instance one school in Montgomeryshire described its aim in 1549 as being to teach "young beginners only to write and sing, and to read so far as the Accidence Rules, (Note: The "accidence rules" refers to how words change depending on context, a very simple level of grammar.) but no grammar". There were a variety of other more informal ways that some children may have received some basic education. For example, tutors employed to educate the offspring of the wealthy occasionally expanded their lessons to a wider group of children, and some priests also taught. However, for the vast majority of the population in the 16th and much of the 17th century, formal education was unattainable. In the early 17th century, around 20% of people in Wales were literate in Welsh or English. Jones and Roderick argue that the peasantry generally was not interested in literacy as it held little practical advantage for them.

Little formal education was available for girls during this period. Endowments for elementary schools often referenced "children" rather than "boys" or "scholars", suggesting that they might have admitted girls. The endowment for a school in Chepstow was unique in stating that a woman teacher should be included in the staff. There is significant evidence of women from well-off families being highly educated during this period, some gentry families employed tutors who probably provided education for the most privileged girls as well as their brothers.

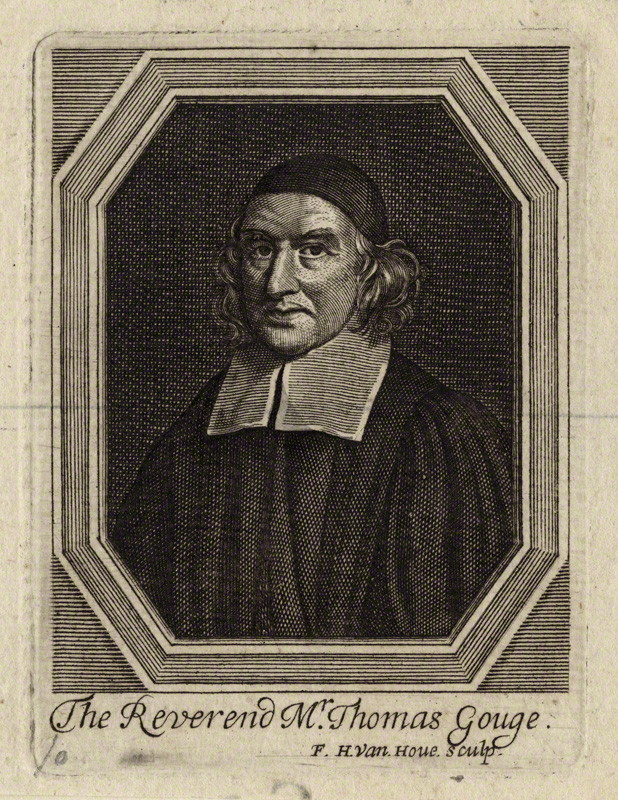
Portrait of Thomas Gouge

The Reformation changed the typical experience of religious education. Previously, with services recited in Latin by priests, often with little understanding, most people's main engagement with religion had come from the images that decorated places of worship. These were discarded during the Reformation, and the growing Puritan movement became concerned about poor levels of literacy. As Wales had particularly low levels of education and had been one of the most royalist areas in the Civil War, Oliver Cromwell's government decided that state intervention was needed. The 1650 Act for Better Propagation and Preaching of the Gospel in Wales appointed a commission that established sixty schools in Wales; these partially resembled the grammar schools but also gave an elementary-level education. They were funded by the Church. These schools were short-lived: only 21 still existed by 1660, and they disappeared entirely after the Restoration. There was ultimately little evidence that the kinds of people they were intended for wanted their children to go to school. In the early 1670s, the clergyman Thomas Gouge began preaching in Wales; by 1675 he had established 87 schools which were attended by a total of 2225 children. The schools were intended "to teach the poor Welsh children to read and write English, cast Accompts [numeracy] and repeat the Catechism". They closed after he died in 1681. The Society for the Promotion of Christian Knowledge (SPCK) was founded in 1699 with similar aims. The organisation established schools in order to increase literacy. Though it operated across England and Wales, four of its five founders had Welsh links.

=== Languages of instruction ===
In reflection of their close relationship with the Roman Catholic Church, the schools of the medieval period were conducted in Latin. In the 15th century, knowledge of English and Latin was one of various forms of education which was seen as increasingly valuable by the Welsh social elite. In the 16th century, the laws that made Wales part of the Kingdom of England also established that English was to be the official language of administration and justice, even though the vast majority of the Welsh population of a lower rank than gentlemen were solely Welsh-speaking. This reinforced the importance of learning English for the Welsh gentry. The grammar schools of the early modern period taught in English or Latin with boys expected to have learnt adequate English before starting, though there was criticism at the time that some had not. A few are known to have explicitly forbidden any usage of Welsh in instruction. The known elementary-level schools of the 16th and 17th centuries had endowments which specified the use of English. They were mainly located in eastern areas of Wales where English was in common use. The schools established by Cromwell's government taught a grammar-school-level education in Latin and a more basic level in English. The schools established by Thomas Gouge were conducted in English.

== Universities ==
During the medieval period, a small number of Welshmen began to attend universities outside of Wales. The earliest option was the University of Bologna in modern Italy, and some are known to have attended the University of Paris. The most known example is Gerald of Wales, a scholar who worked as a clerk in the royal court of England. The University of Oxford and the University of Cambridge were founded in the 12th and 13th centuries respectively. Between 1200 and 1500, about 400 Welshmen were registered as attending the University of Oxford and 40 were registered at the University of Cambridge, but there may have been others who attended but did not register. A number also attended continental universities or trained in the Inns of Court. During his rebellion, Owain Glyndwr considered the idea of creating two universities one in North and one in South Wales, which, according to historians Jones and Roderick, would have allowed him to create a governing class.

In the 16th century, there was an increased interest in attending university. Historian W.P. Griffith estimated that 200 Welsh students attended the University of Oxford in the first 40 years of the century. He also estimated that 3,000 attended the University of Oxford, University of Cambridge or the Inns of Court in the hundred years following 1540. This expansion in demand was partially due to the same factors as those affecting the expansion in lower levels of education, growing employment opportunities for educated men. It was also influenced by universities, which were mainly institutions for the education of the clergy, increasingly becoming acceptable for other gentlemen. Welsh students were often from more modest backgrounds than their English counterparts. The poorest men could gain admission by acting as servants in university colleges in exchange for the removal of fees and some financial support. Welshmen remained under-represented in higher education as a proportion of the English and Welsh population. The average age of entrance was 18, with significant variances. For instance students progressing to one of these institutions from grammar school tended to be between 14 and 16 years old.

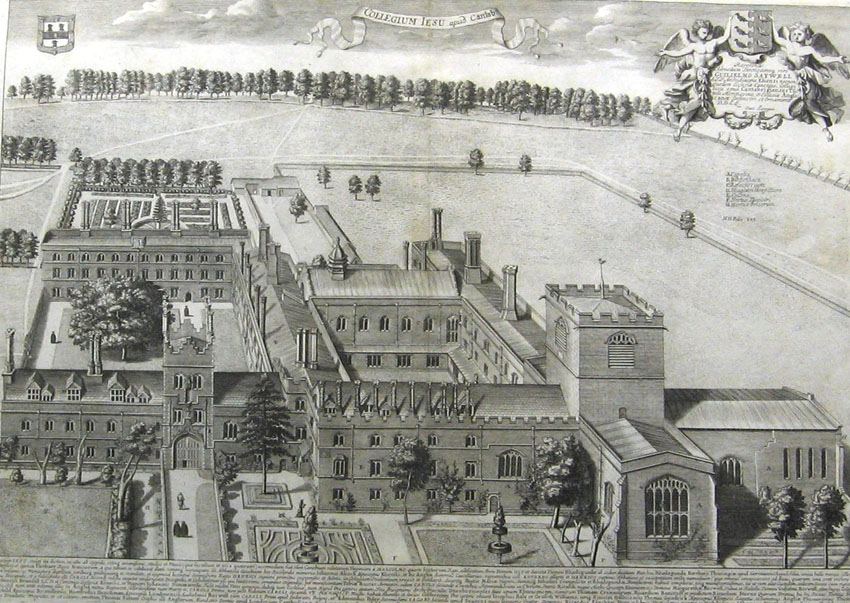
Illustration of Jesus College, Cambridge by David Loggan (1690)

In the medieval period, the most common area of study was Canon and Civil law, but this gradually changed throughout the 16th century to a Bachelor of Arts. About 50% of students graduated. For those who did graduate, it typically took four years to gain a bachelor's degree and another three to become a Master of Arts. Gaining the latter was useful for men wishing to become clerics. The curriculum was similar to that of medieval grammar schools. It focused heavily on Aristotle but it was also widening to include Greek and Hebrew texts. Those progressing on to a Master's degree studied a wider range of fields—"ethics, physics, natural philosophy and metaphysics". Clerical students were involved in much scholarship. That was less true for other men, but there were some examples of dedicated students. One such motivated scholar was Edward Carne from Ewenny in the Vale of Glamorgan, who had a celebrated legal career and eventually became Mary I's ambassador to the papacy. Jesus College at Oxford University was founded by Hugh Price from Brecon and was particularly associated with Welsh students.

== Bibliography ==
- Clement, Mary. "GOUGE, THOMAS (1605? - 1681), Nonconformist divine and philanthropist". Dictionary of Welsh Biography.
- Collins, Sian (16 March 2017). "Society for Promoting Christian Knowledge (SPCK)". Cambridge University Library.
- Greaves, Richard L. (3 January 2008). "Gouge, Thomas (1605–1681)". Oxford Dictionary of National Biography.
- Jones, Gareth Elwyn; Roderick, Gordon Wynne (2003). History of Education in Wales. University of Wales Press. ISBN 978-0708318089.
- Pearce, John (2004). "Archaeology, writing tablets and literacy in Roman Britain". Gallia Préhistoire. 61: 43–51. doi:10.3406/galia.2004.3186. ISSN 0016-4119. JSTOR 43607827.
- Seaborne, Malcolm (1992). Schools in Wales 1500 - 1900: a social and architectural history. Gee and Son. ISBN 978-0-7074-0222-2.
