= The Principality (newspaper) =

- Chwi a gewch wybod y gwirionedd, a'r gwirionedd a'ch rhyddha chwl
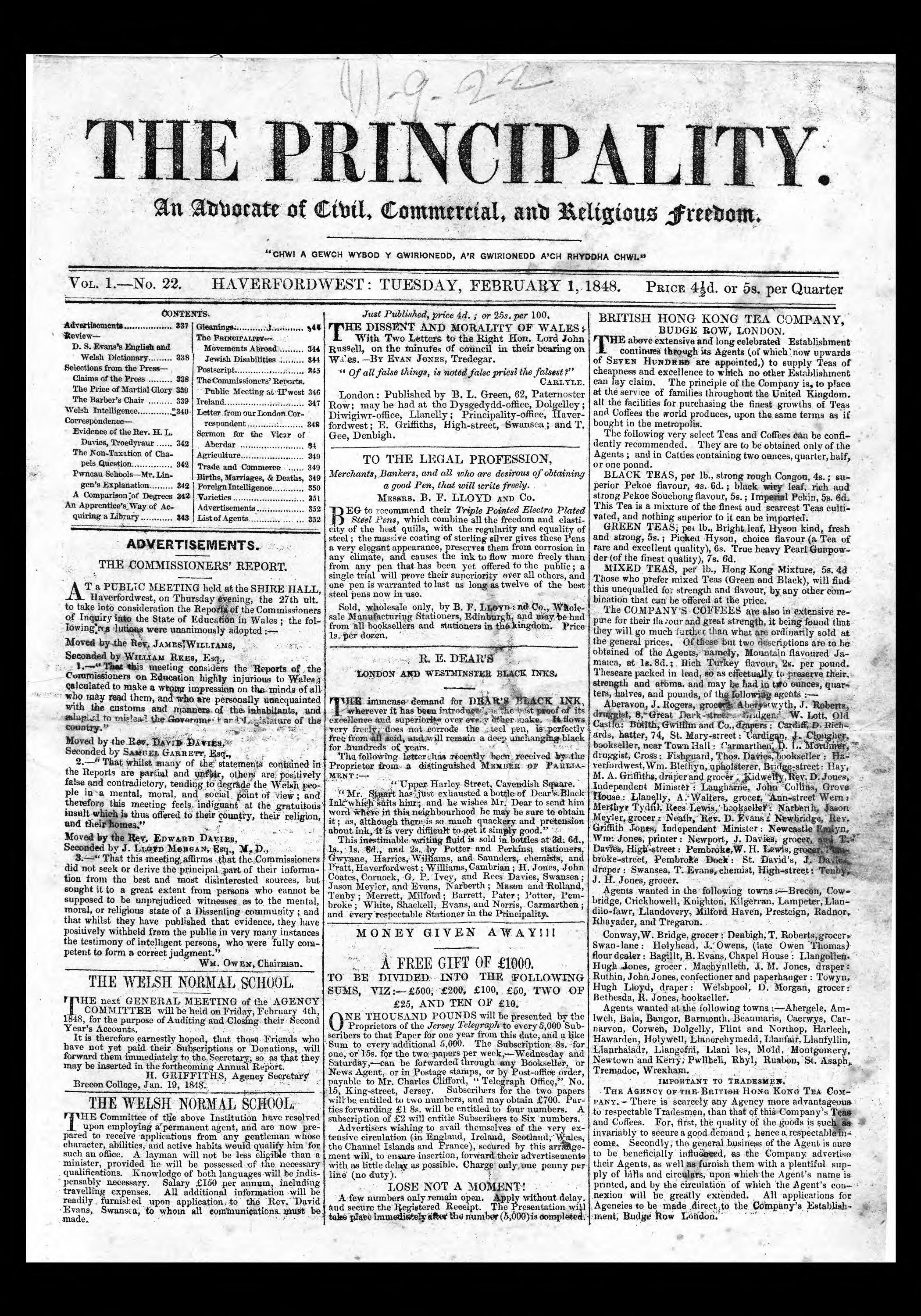
- The Principality: advocate of civil, commercial, and religious freedom
- Type: weekly newspaper
- Owner: David Tudor Evans
- Founder: David Tudor Evans
- Publisher: David Tudor Evans
- Editor: Evan Jones, John Emlyn Jones[*]
- Launched: 7 September 1847
- Ceased publication: August 1850
- City: Haverfordwest, Cardiff
- Country: Wales
- Circulation: South Wales
- OCLC number: 51093024

The Principality (established in 1847 by David Tudor Evans) was a weekly English language newspaper that was distributed throughout South Wales in the United Kingdom.

The paper was initially produced in Haverfordwest, but moved to Cardiff in 1848. It mainly covered national and religious news.
