= Treachery of the Blue Books =

1847 Parliamentary report

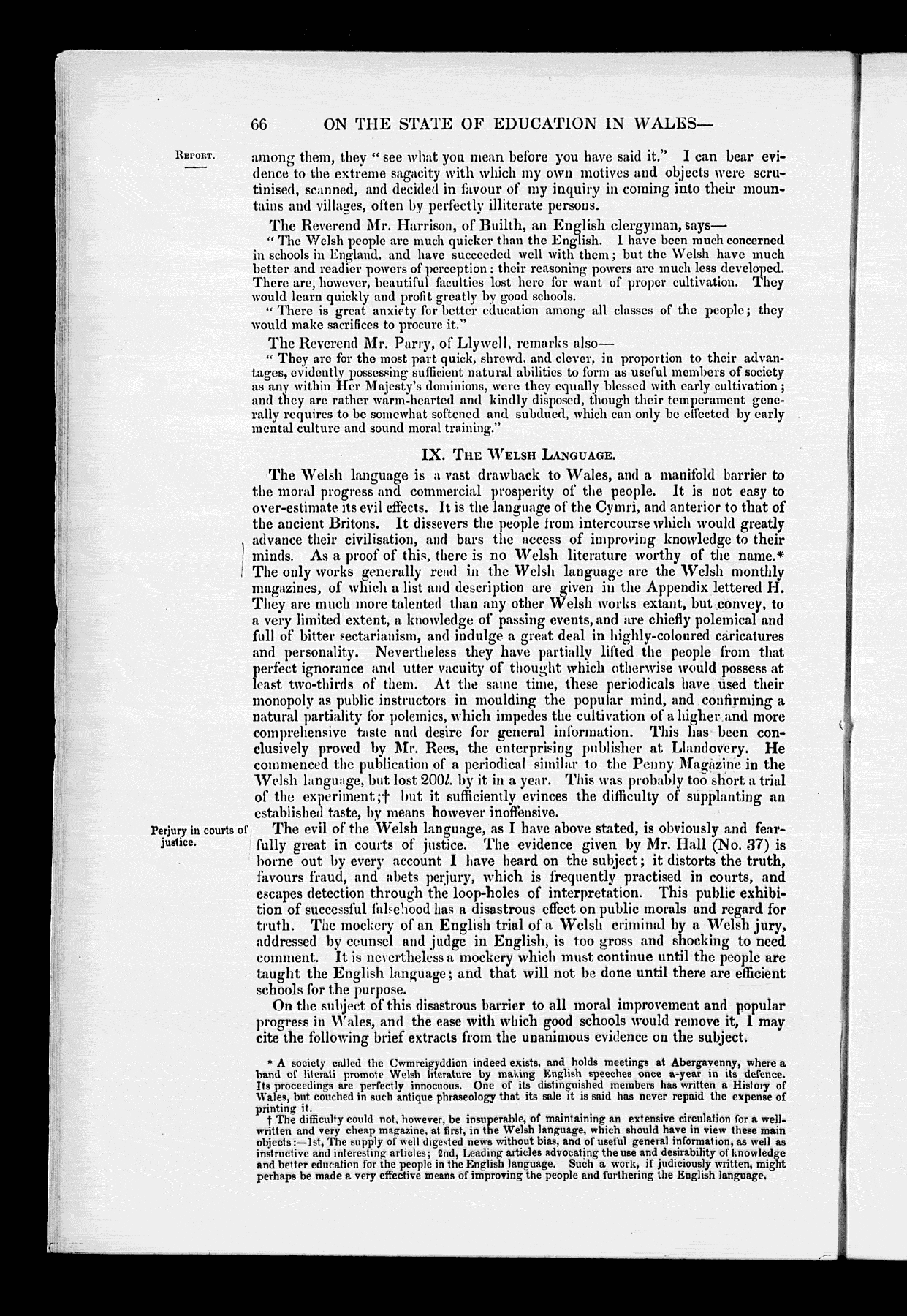
Blue Books pt 2, no. 9, p. 66, on the Welsh Language: "The Welsh language is a vast drawback to Wales, and a manifold barrier to the moral progress and commercial prosperity of the people. It is not easy to over-estimate its evil effects."

The Reports of the Commissioners of Inquiry into the State of Education in Wales, commonly referred to in Wales as "The Treason of the Blue Books" or "The Treachery of the Blue Books" (Welsh: Brad y Llyfrau Gleision) or just the "Blue Books" is a three-part publication by the British government in 1847 about education in Wales. Commissioned in response to government concern over unrest in the region, the publication caused uproar in Wales, where many saw it as disparaging the Welsh, as it was particularly scathing in its view of the nonconformity, the Welsh language and the morality of the Welsh people in general. The Welsh sobriquet Brad y Llyfrau Gleision was from the name of a play satirising the reports, and those who gave evidence to the inquiry, which was published seven years after the reports. The Welsh Academy Encyclopaedia of Wales says that the name "took hold of the public imagination to such an extent that ever since the report has been known by that name".

According to the author and business academic, Simon Brooks, the Blue Books are regarded today as "colonial diktat", and are "the most important ideological intervention by the British state in Wales in the 19th century." The inquiry did not lead to any governmental action and the hostile reaction was mainly aimed at the comments about Welsh morality. One of the many legacies of the reports that prominent Welsh nationalist activist Saunders Lewis opined in The Fate of the Language in 1962 was that Wales embraced bilingualism, through the requirement to learn English as a second language.

== Terminology ==
The commissioners' report soon came to be known in Welsh as Brad y Llyfrau Gleision (English: The Treachery of the Blue Books), a deliberate allusion to the Brad y Cyllyll Hirion (English: The Treachery of the Long Knives), a pseudo-historical event said to have taken place during the Anglo-Saxon settlement of Britain. During this event, the Celtic British leaders are said to have been invited to discuss peace by the Saxon leader Hengist. However, after being asked to remove their weapons and each sit next to a Saxon, the summit ends in massacre when on Hengist's instruction, the Saxons slaughtered the unarmed British with their "long knives" (seaxes) that they had concealed in their shoes.

The event had been used as a popular illustration of deceit and betrayal by Welsh writers for centuries, being first recorded in the 9th century Historia Brittonum and giving rise to the aphorism "twyll y cyllyll hirion" (English: Deceit of the long knives), first recorded around 1587. As such, the name was intended to parallel the promise of the inquiry commissioners to raise educational standards and reform the existing institutions, with the ancient Saxon's promise of peace and the final reports attack on the nation's language, culture and morals with the plot to kill the British leaders.

== Background ==
During the second quarter of the 19th century there was much public unrest in Wales and this persuaded the British Government that the root causes of this needed to be understood. There had been riots in Tredegar and Merthyr Tydfil and other places, trouble related to land enclosures in Ceredigion, the Rebecca Riots and the Chartist march on Newport. As was the case throughout England and Wales at the time, the view was held that the solution was pedagogical, at all levels of society (in particular the ‘lower’). The government establishment assumed, even before the inquiry took place, that this would be mainly in the English language, and thus would require trained teachers to be provided.

At the time of the report education was not compulsory and schools were largely provided and run by religious institutions, charities and private ventures. In 1833 the government had started to contribute towards the cost of erecting both National Society and British Schools; at the same time, the Church of England wanted to control education. In 1843, after strong protests against it, Robert Peel's Conservative government abandoned a bill that would have established schools for the poor, and ensured that they were run by Anglicans. The reaction by Nonconformists was fierce, because for many, state interference into education was dangerous and considered a form of oppression.

The majority of people in Wales at that time spoke only Welsh. Cardiff, the industrial Valleys and the coalfields of the North-east were bilingual. The three commissioners sent to Wales were English monoglots, who "knew nothing about the Welsh language, nonconformity or elementary education". The report exaggerated the weaknesses of the Welsh education system, according to historian John Davies, "because of the ignorance and the prejudice of the Commissioners. Wales was alien to them, and they had no experience of teaching working-class children".

According to academic and author Simon Brooks (a member of Plaid Cymru), "the Welsh-language community was so bereft of rights that it was used by politicians in central Europe as an example of linguistic subjugation."

== Inquiry ==
The public inquiry was commissioned as a result of pressure from William Williams, Radical MP for Coventry, who was himself a Welshman by birth and Welsh-speaking, and was concerned about the state of education in Wales. The secretary of the government's Committee of the Privy Council on Education at the time was James Kay-Shuttleworth, a man who held the view that the solution to the poor conditions suffered by labouring classes lay in improved education. Kay-Shuttleworth's guidelines on selecting the commissioners to conduct the inquiry was that they were to "examine the whole question with impartiality", be "laymen of the Church of England", "accustomed to statistical inquiries", and "capable of analysing the opinions on social, political and religious questions which may be presented to them, and of diffusing juster views among all classes". The commissioners appointed by the Privy Council's committee on education, were three young English law graduates; Ralph Lingen, Jelinger C. Symons, and Henry R. Vaughan Johnson. The commissioners visited every part of Wales during 1846, collecting evidence and statistics. They spoke no Welsh, but it was generally the army of Welsh-speaking assistant commissioners, who were also appointed, who visited the schools, villages, and towns. Schools attended by children from the higher and middle classes were out of scope of the inquiry, so were not included in the survey. The evidence collected from Anglican witnesses was treated seriously whilst that from Nonconformists may have been ignored. This was a time when Wales was a stronghold of Nonconformism.

== Report ==
The work was completed in 1847 and printed in November of that year in three large blue-covered volumes ("blue books" being a widely used term for all kinds of parliamentary reports). The full title was:

Reports of the commissioners of inquiry into the state of education in Wales: appointed by the Committee of council on education, in pursuance of proceedings in the House of commons, on the motion of Mr. Williams, of March 10, 1846, for an address to the Queen, praying Her Majesty to direct an inquiry to be made into the state of education in the principality of Wales, and especially into the means afforded to the labouring classes of acquiring a knowledge of the English language.

Sunday Schools The report acknowledged that the only schools in most of Wales were the Sunday Schools; in R W Lingen's region, for example, 30,000 pupils attended day school, whilst 80,000 attended Sunday school.

Schools

The report found that "Welsh parents [had already] endorsed an English-language future"; that English was already being taught in schools; and that the primary function of the existing Welsh schools was the teaching of English. The report was detailed and its authors criticised several sectors of society, including the gentry, clergy, and capitalists for their lack of interest in providing schools. They concluded that schools in Wales were extremely inadequate, often with teachers speaking only English and using only English textbooks in areas where the children spoke only Welsh, and that Welsh-speakers had to rely on the Nonconformist Sunday Schools to acquire literacy. They also said that amongst the causes of this were the use of the Welsh language and nonconformity.

Society

It is rarely observed that the commissioners complimented the Welsh on their hunger for education, and noted the sacrifices many were prepared to make to acquire it, the intelligence they brought to bear on theological matters, bred in Sunday schools, and their quickness in mathematics.

— A History of Education in Wales.

The report was damning of the Welsh people, and "mildly pornographic in parts" (Brooks),characterising them as dirty, ignorant, lazy, and immoral.

The commissioners often simply reported verbatim the prejudiced opinions of landowners and local Anglican clergy, jealous of the successes of the chapels. The more bilious editorial attacks on Welsh culture mostly emanated from Commissioner Lingen and others who worked with him. They often asked complicated questions, according to the historian John Davies, and relied on bad translations, and misinterpreted the pupils' answers.

=== Statistics ===
These do not include Sunday schools or schools for the higher and middle classes.

The report provided a breakdown of the 1,657 schools it surveyed by the language used for teaching.

Schools for the labouring classes by language of instruction
Language	North Wales	Central Wales	South Wales	Monmouth	Total
Welsh Only	1	1	0	0	2
English Only	530	206	465	120	1,321
Welsh and English	46	33	239	7	325
Unknown	1	0	8	0	9
Total	578	240	712	127	1,657

Notes:

- North Wales: Anglesey, Caernarfon, Denbigh, Flint, Merioneth and Montgomery.
- Central Wales: Brecon, Cardigan and Radnor.
- South Wales: Glamorgan, Carmarthen and Pembroke.

With the exception of Monmouth the report provides a breakdown of the different types of schools in Wales.

Schools for the labouring classes by type (Excluding Monmouth)
Type Of School	For Profit	Schools	Scholars
Private Schools (including Dame Schools)	Yes	708	18,726
Church of England Schools (Parochial or National Society)	No	567	34,710
British Schools	No	64	7,654
Other Non Sectarian Schools	No	29	1,726
Nonconformist Schools (Baptist, Wesleyan, Methodist etc)	No	91	4,104
Workmen's Schools (including one Factory school)	No	25	3,037
Workhouse Schools	No	19	851
Mrs Bevan's Circulating Schools	No	14	890
Other Denomination Schools (inc Roman Catholic)	No	13	504
Total		1,530	72,202

The government did not contribute anything to the running of costs of schools in Wales (and England) until the decision in late 1846 to start funding apprentice teachers and reward school masters who trained them. Until that time schools had to rely solely on school fees and charitable donations.

Funding of schools for the labouring classes
Source	Amount	%
School Fees	£21,103	53%
Subscriptions and Donations	£12,750	32%
Endowments	£5,224	13%
Collections	£675	2%
Total	£39,752	100%

Inspection of Schools for the labouring classes
Inspected by	North Wales	Central Wales	South Wales	Monmouth	Total
Committee	53	18	47	15	132
Minister	266	89	166	31	552
Ordinary	1	0	1	0	2
Patron	72	23	94	6	195
Inspector	0	5	68	0	73
None	232	0	418	75	725
Number of Schools	578	240	712	127	1,657

Notes:

- Some schools were inspected by more than one group of inspectors so the number of inspections can exceed the number of schools.
- Committee: Committee, Trustees, Governors or Guardians
- Patron: Patron or Promotor
- Inspector: Government inspectors & inspectors employed by Mrs Bevan Schools

== Reaction ==
The report's publication resulted in a furious reaction in Wales which lasted for years. The clerics of the Established Church were considered as internal enemies. Staunch Anglicans refuted the report, next came the satirical attacks and statistically-based analytical challenge of the facts from Evan Jones (Ieuan Gwynedd), a Nonconformist journalist.

"Eloquent speeches" by Nonconformists such as Henry Richard and the essays of Ieuan Gwynedd as well as angry nationalistic responses came from editors of the Welsh journals, particularly the 'incisive articles' by Lewis Edwards in Y Traethodydd and David Rees in Y Diwygiwr. Generally speaking, the historian John Davies reported that this led to the notion that the chapel people were the only true Welsh, and that Welshness was synonymous with Nonconformity.

As time passed, Wales saw campaign after campaign against wantonness, drunkenness etc, and accepted that reform was needed. In an apparent attempt to turn the attacks to the advantage of the Nonconformists, Jones (Ieuan Gwynedd) suggested that the Welsh nation had been unjustly condemned on religious rather than nationalistic grounds. Radical leaders led mass meetings to protest against the defamations in the reports.

=== Admittance ===
A letter published by commissioner Jelinger C. Symons in 1848 shows that Wheeler, Cookson and Johnson were aware that their conclusions presented a distorted and disproportionately negative portrayal of Welsh society and culture; in the letter, Symons admitted that some witnesses were prejudiced, that certain allegations were too extreme or insufficiently substantiated to include, and that newspaper coverage had focused excessively on 'the dark side of the picture', thereby doing 'great injustice to the Welsh character'. Despite acknowledging these flaws, Symons continued to defend the overall conclusions of the reports, which critics regarded as an attack on the Welsh language, Welsh morality and Nonconformist culture.

=== The play ===
Seven years after the report was published, the poet Robert Jones Derfel published a play, Brad y Llyfrau Gleision ("Treason of the Blue Books"). The play satirised the government commissioners and their Welsh witnesses. According to Phil Carradice, in his book Snapshots of Welsh History, "the play opens in Hell where the Devil decides that the Welsh people are too good and too godly and are becoming more godly by the hour thanks to the influence of non-conformity. He promptly hatches a plan to bring down this pure and godly people". A summary of the play on the website of the National Library of Wales describes how the "Treason" in the play is that committed by the Welsh church goers and clergymen and it says that Derfel, and others, "thought that their evidence enhanced and even fed The Blue Books' anti-Welsh judgements". The play so gripped the imagination of the Welsh public, that the reports have been known in Wales by that sobriquet since then. The play was published by Isaac Clarke in Ruthin.

== Legacy ==
The Books remain an invaluable, although slanted, source of information on mid-19th century Welsh society.

Saunders Lewis, in his BBC address Tynged yr Iaith ("The Fate of the Language"), maintained that the Blue Books were for Welsh history "the most important nineteenth-century historical documents we possess" as their effect was to turn Wales into a more bilingual country, through the requirement to learn English as a second language. Such a judgement also reflects the fact that the publication of the reports, and the controversy that followed, was the catalyst for a much greater level of nonconformist involvement in the politics of Wales than hitherto. Critics such as Evan Jones (Ieuan Gwynedd), William Rees (Gwilym Hiraethog), Henry Richard, Thomas Price and Sir Thomas Phillips gained wide publicity for their trenchant criticisms of the reports. Over time these criticisms evolved into an organised political action, which culminated at the general election of 1868.

== See also ==
- Welsh Not
- History of education in Wales (1701–1870)
- Elen Egryn
- Education (Scotland) Act 1872
