= Y Gymraes =

Welsh women's magazine

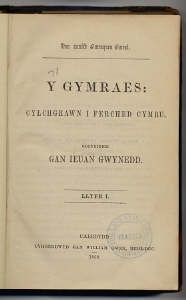
Y Gymraes – women's magazine founded in January 1850

Y Gymraes (literally The Welsh Woman) was a women's magazine founded by the minister and journalist Evan Jones in January 1850 in response to a government report on education in Wales which had strongly criticized the morals of Welsh women.

== Background ==
In 1846, after a Parliamentary speech by radical MP William Williams, concerns were raised regarding the level of education in Wales. This resulted in an enquiry carried out by three English commissioners appointed by the Privy Council, none of whom had any knowledge of the Welsh language, Nonconformity or elementary education. The commissioners had relied heavily on the information they had received from Anglican clergymen. The findings of the report were immensely detailed and were damning towards not only the state of education in Wales but drew a very critical picture of the Welsh as a people, labelling them as immoral and backwards. Welsh women were said to be licentious and "cut off from civilising influences by the impenetrable Welsh language". The report drew questions over the chastity of the poor and was just as damning to the wealthier women of the country, claiming that English farmers’ daughters were respectable, while their Welsh counterparts were in the "constant habit of being courted in bed". Welsh wives were said to be "most slovenly and improvinent, and as mothers, ignorant and injudicious" knowing "next to nothing of the management of a house".

Published in April 1847 by Ralph Lingen, one of the three commissioners, the report in three blue-covered volumes became known as "The Blue Books" but such was the outcry against it in Wales, that it was soon branded Brad y Llyfrau Gleision or the Treason of the Blue Books.

The report resulted in a concerted effort to ensure that Welsh women would in future be above rebuke. Several Welsh periodicals were launched aimed at upholding the reputation of Welsh speakers, especially the morality of Welsh women. The earliest and one of the most significant was the women's literary magazine Y Gymraes.

== Establishment of Y Gymraes ==
The magazine was established by Evan Jones in January 1850 under the patronage of Lady Llanover. He set out to promote higher standards of living for women in Wales, encouraging articles on religion and morality as well as housekeeping. The Welsh-language poet Elen Egryn contributed an introduction in verse to the first issue in which she called for women to rise "above shame and hateful mockery" (goruwch gwarth a dirmyg cas).

Evans was already suffering from poor health in 1850 when he established the magazine. As a result of financial difficulties, publication continued only to the end of 1851. A vain attempt at reviving publication was made by the Congregational minister David Rees (1801–1869), but Jones died in February 1852.

== Follow-up ==
There was to be no further women's magazine in Wales until 1879 when Y Frythones (The Female Briton) was published under the editorship of Sarah Jane Rees. It lasted only until 1891. In 1896, again with the title Y Gymraes (Welsh Woman), another women's magazine edited by Alice Gray Jones was published, continuing until December 1934.
