= Sarah Prescott =

British writer and academic

- Born: 1968 (age 57–58)

Academic background
- Education: University of York; University of Exeter
- Thesis: Feminist Literary History and British Women Novelists of the 1720s (1997)

Academic work
- Discipline: English literature
- Sub-discipline: Welsh literature in English
- Institutions: University of Aberystwyth; University College Dublin; University of Edinburgh
- Main interests: Welsh writing in English, women's poetry, Welsh women writers

Sarah Helen Prescott FLSW (born February 1968) is a British academic specializing in the history of Welsh literature in English. Since 2022, she has served as Vice-Principal and Head of the College of Arts, Humanities and Social Sciences at the University of Edinburgh.

== Biography ==
Prescott was born in February 1968. After earning a B.A. at the University of York, Prescott continued her studies at the University of Exeter, where she received a PhD in 1997 with a thesis titled Feminist Literary History and British Women Novelists of the 1720s.

From the mid-1990s, she taught at Aberystwyth University, where she also conducted research into women's poetry, Welsh writing in English, and women's writing in Wales. In addition to two books on 18th-century female writers, she contributed to journals including Modern Philology, Huntington Library Quarterly, Eighteenth-Century Studies and Notes and Queries. She served on the editorial board of Literature Compass. She was a member of the Institute for Medieval and Early Modern Studies, covering work in the English Departments of Aberystwyth and the University of Wales, Bangor. She also collaborated with Professor Jane Aaron of the University of Glamorgan on the third volume of the Oxford Literary History of Wales, which covers "Welsh Writing in English, 1536–1914".

From 2013, she was Principal Investigator for a three-year project funded by the Leverhulme Trust on "Women’s Poetry 1400-1800 from Ireland, Scotland and Wales in Irish, English, Scots, Scottish Gaelic, and Welsh", in collaboration with Aberystwyth University's Welsh and Celtic Studies Department, the University of Edinburgh and the National University of Ireland, Galway. She was elected a Fellow of the Learned Society of Wales in 2016.

At the University of Aberystwyth, Prescott was also Director of the Institute of Literature, Languages and the Creative Arts (ILLCA), which includes the Aberystwyth Arts Centre.

In 2016, she was appointed Principal of the College of Arts and Humanities at University College Dublin. In 2022, she was appointed Vice-Principal and Head of the College of Arts, Humanities and Social Sciences at the University of Edinburgh. As Vice-Principal, Prescott is a member of the Senior Leadership Team and University Executive. On 20 May 2025, the Senate, the University of Edinburgh's supreme academic body, approved the motion that "Senate has no confidence in the University Executive’s leadership in relation to the University’s financial situation", by a two thirds majority.

In September 2026, Prescott defended the controversial closure of 92 degree programmes in the College of Arts, Humanities and Social Sciences under the Academic Size and Shape Project, describing it as "routine", a characterisation disputed by UCU and members of the Academic Senate.

== Awards ==
In 2013, Prescott was awarded the M. Wynn Thomas Prize for her essay "Archipelagic Coterie Space: Katherine Philips and Welsh Women’s Writing".

== Selected works ==
- Prescott, Sarah Helen (1997). Feminist literary history and British women novelists of the 1720s (Ph.D). University of Exeter.
- Prescott, Sarah (2003). Women, Authorship and Literary Culture 1690 - 1740. Palgrave Macmillan UK. ISBN 978-1-4039-0323-5.
- Prescott, Sarah (2008). Eighteenth-century Writing from Wales: Bards and Britons. University of Wales Press. ISBN 978-0-7083-2053-2.
