= Thomas Gouge =

English Presbyterian clergyman

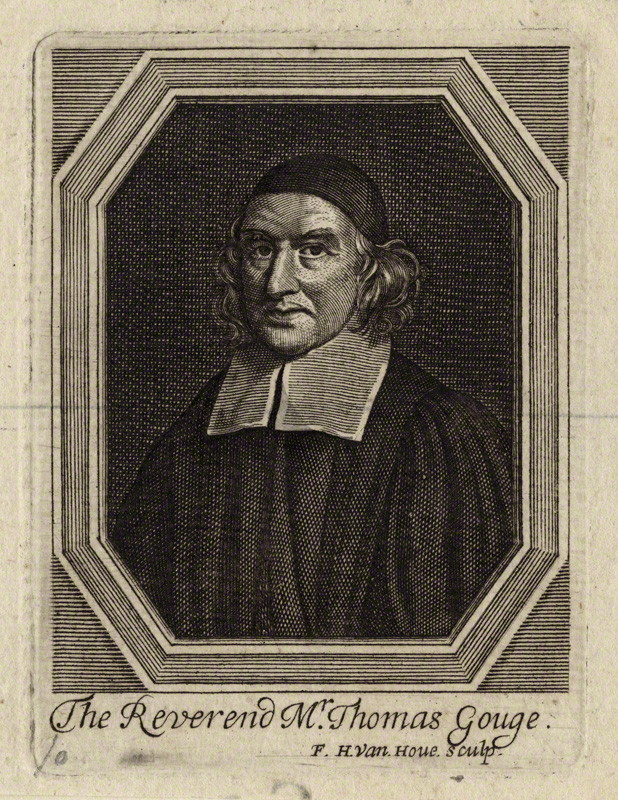
Thomas Gouge, Presbyterian vicar of St. Sepulchre until 1662

Thomas Gouge (19 September 1605 – 29 October 1681) was an English Presbyterian clergyman, a contemporary of Samuel Pepys, associated with the Puritan movement.

Gouge was the son of William Gouge, himself a clergyman and the rector of St. Anne's church in Blackfriars. Thomas Gouge was educated at Eton and at King's College, Cambridge, where he became a fellow in 1628. He was the vicar of the parish of St. Sepulchre from 1638, a position he held until the Act of Uniformity in 1662. Gouge's refusal to use the 1662 version of the Book of Common Prayer is recounted in the diary of Samuel Pepys.

Thomas Gouge was famous during his lifetime for acts of charity, especially in the aftermath of the Great Fire of London. He provided work for the poor in flax and hemp-spinning. He travelled extensively in Wales performing charitable works and distributing religious literature there. Gouge's best remembered work is Riches Increased by Giving to the Poor. Gouge's funeral sermon was preached by John Tillotson, later Archbishop of Canterbury.
