= Evan Jones (Ieuan Gwynedd) =

Welsh minister and journalist (1820–1852)

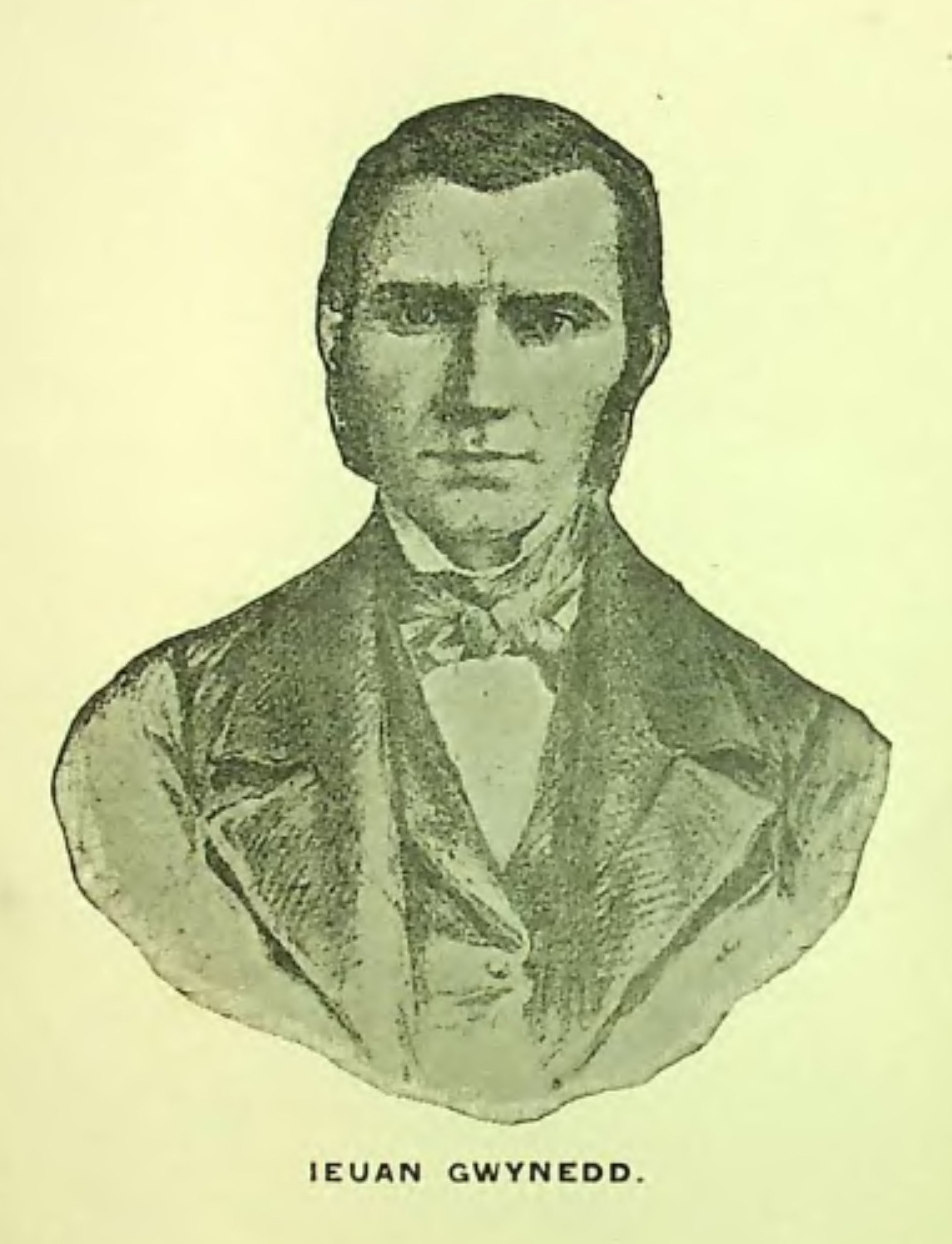
- Jones from a 1900 biography
- Born: 5 September 1820; Dolgellau, Wales
- Died: 23 February 1852 (aged 31); Cardiff, Wales
- Occupations: Independent minister; journalist

Evan Jones (5 September 1820 – 23 February 1852), also known by his bardic name Ieuan Gwynedd, was an independent minister and journalist. Jones is chiefly remembered for his defence of women following the damning insinuations made in the Reports of the Commissioners of Inquiry into the state of education in Wales, commonly known as the Treason of the Blue Books in Wales. He edited several papers in London and in Wales but it his work on Y Gymraes (The Welshwoman), which has made him of particular interest to Welsh historians.

== Early life ==
Jones was born in the Dolgellau area in 1820, one of the six children of Evan and Catherine Jones. In 1824 the family moved to Bontnewydd in Gwynedd, but his poor health as a child resulted in an erratic education, with Jones attending a variety of schools. In 1836 he was given a job at a bank in his home town, but he was let go that same year. That same year he made several attempts to open schools in the area, including Brithdir, Pen-y-Bont and Llanwddyn, but failed on every occasion due to a lack of local support.

== Ministry work ==
On the 18 March 1838 Jones first addressed the congregation of Sardis chapel in Llanwddyn. The following year he took up a teaching job working as assistant master at Daniel Williams's school in Bangor. He left the post just six months later and became a student of Reverend J. Jones at his school in Marton, Shropshire. When Jones died in 1840, Evans took over his ministerial role at the local village church, continuing his schooling with the Reverend T. Jones of Minsterley. On completing his schooling in 1841 he was accepted to Brecon College where he spent the next four years. After leaving the college he was ordained the minister of Saron Independent Chapel in Tredegar. Four months after taken up his ministry, In November 1845, he married Catherine, daughter of John Sankey of Rorrington Hall in Morton. Their union was short-lived, the only child of their marriage died in infancy and Catherine died on 25 April 1847. Jones' continuing ill-health impacted on his career when he was unable to continue his ministry of the Tredegar parish leaving the post at the end of 1847. During this period he was approached to take up the position of secretary of the National Temperance Association but he turned it down, again due to his poor health.

== As a journalist and campaigner ==
In March 1848 he moved to Cardiff to edit The Principality, a weekly English-language newspaper which had been established the previous year by David Tudor Evans. Jones left the paper in September after falling out with the publisher. A month later he was working on John Cassell's Standard of Freedom in London, followed by an editorial role on The Pathway before editing Almanac y Cymru in 1849. Before ill health forced him to return to Cardiff he remarried, to Rachel, daughter of Reverend Walter Lewis of Tredustan.

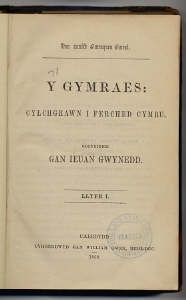
Y Gymraes - The women's magazine founded in January 1850

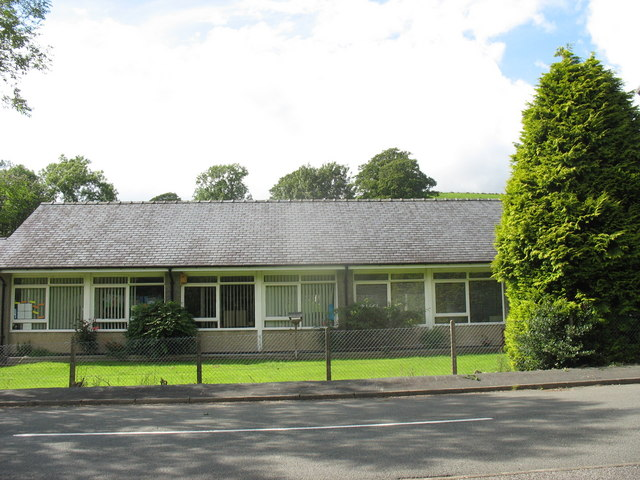
Ysgol Ieuan Gwynedd, Rhydymain (a school named after Ieuan Gwynedd)

In 1850 Jones was the first editor of Y Gymraes (The Welshwomen) under the patronage of Augusta Hall, Baroness Llanover. Y Gymraes, which first appeared in January of that year. It was published as a direct response to the debate caused by an 1847 governmental bill into the state of education in Wales. The report were immensely detailed and was damning towards not only the state of education in Wales but drew a very critical picture of the Welsh as a people. Jones was a constant champion towards his people, specially the womenfolk, whose morals were severely criticized in the report. He set out to prove that the morality of the Welsh were no different to the English to which the Bill compared them, making detailed studies of facts such as the comparison of the countries' illegitimacy rates. Although he privately disapproved of some practices conducted in Wales, such as bundling, he defended Welsh women resolutely and became their moral champion. The decision to publish Y Gymraes was not taken lightly as Jones' health had worsened and he did not expect to live to see more than a few issues of the monthly paper. Jones also edited a quarterly during this time, the Adolygydd, but both papers were financial failures, but were saved from closure two years later when they were taken over by the Reverend David Rees of Llanelli who wanted Jones to continue as joint editor with him. This however never came to pass as Jones died in Cardiff on 23 February 1852. He was buried at Groes-wen.

A monument to Jones, which is now a grade II listed building, was erected at Groeswen Chapel. The reason given for the monument's listing is as "an unusual neo-classical monument to a prominent Welsh journalist and pioneer of non-conformism."

== See also ==
- Treachery of the Blue Books

== Footnotes ==
Notes

Primary sources

- Bohata, Kirsti (4 November 2002). "'for Wales, see England?' suffrage and the new woman in Wales". Women's History Review. 11 (4): 643–656. doi:10.1080/09612020200200342.
- Davies, John; Jenkins, Nigel; Menna, Baines; Lynch, Peredur I., eds. (2008). The Welsh Academy Encyclopaedia of Wales. Cardiff: University of Wales Press. ISBN 978-0-7083-1953-6.
- John, Angela V. (1991). "Beyond Paternalism: The Ironmaster's Wife in the Industrial Community". In John, Angela V. (ed.). Our Mothers' Land, Chapters in Welsh Women's History 1830–1939. Cardiff: University of Wales Press. ISBN 978-0-7083-1129-5.
- Wallace, Ryland (2009). The Women's Suffrage Movement in Wales, 1866–1928. Cardiff: University of Wales Press. ISBN 978-0-708-32173-7.
- Williams, Rhiannon (1991). "The True 'Cymraes': Images of Women in Women's Nineteenth-Century Welsh Periodicals". In John, Angela V. (ed.). Our Mothers' Land, Chapters in Welsh Women's History 1830–1939. Cardiff: University of Wales Press. ISBN 978-0-7083-1129-5.
