= Babington, Somerset =

Village in Somerset, England

Coordinates: 51.258210°N 2.422126°W

Babington
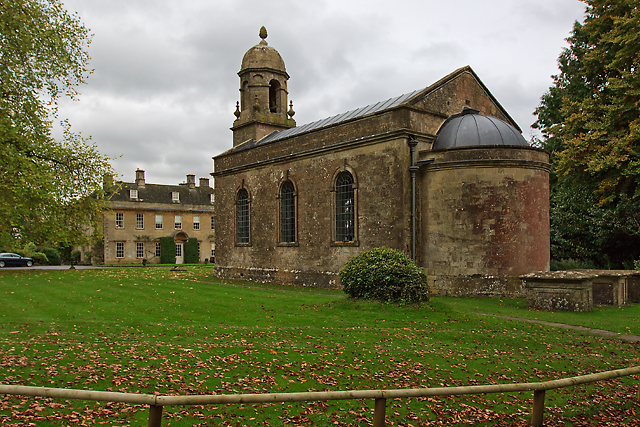
- St Margaret's Church and Babington House

- Location within Somerset
- OS grid reference: ST706510
- Civil parish: Kilmersdon
- Unitary authority: Somerset
- Ceremonial county: Somerset
- Region: South West
- Country: England
- Sovereign state: United Kingdom
- Post town: BATH
- Postcode district: BA3
- Police: Avon and Somerset
- Fire: Devon and Somerset
- Ambulance: South Western
- UK Parliament: Frome and East Somerset

Babington is a small village in the civil parish of Kilmersdon, Somerset, England, which has now largely disappeared. It is between Radstock and Frome.

== History ==
In 1233 or 1234 much of the southern area of what is now Babington Parish was granted to the Knights Templar and became known as Temple Newbury. It consisted of around four Virgates and may have supported cloth making and fulling mills.

The parish of Babington was part of the Kilmersdon Hundred,

The village dates from medieval times. Its name derives from the Babington family, who were once associated with the village, but appears to have been largely demolished to make way for the manor house around 1705. Evidence of the medieval village was found during excavations carried out in 1997.

It is known that the manor was sold by Thomas and Mary Mankham to Joan Elcode, a widow, in a deed dated Easter 1572. The Manor then contained 7 messuages, one cottage, 10 tofts, 1 water mill, 10 gardens, 14 orchards, 300 acres (1,214,057 m^{2}) of land, 120 acres (485,623 m^{2}) of meadow, 160 acres (647,497 m^{2}) of pasture, 20 acres (80,937 m^{2}) of wood, 120 acres (485,623 m^{2}) of furze and 4s annual rent and 1 lb of pepper.

In 1931 the parish had a population of 248. On 1 April 1949 the parish was abolished and merged with Kilmersdon and Coleford.

== Babington House ==
The current Babington House was built around 1705 for Henry Mompesson, probably on the foundations of an earlier building. Babington was inherited by successive members of the Knatchbull family until 1952, when the House and immediate grounds were sold. In 2000, it was bought by the Soho House club, and converted to a hotel, club and wedding venue in 2000.

The Georgian architecture house is designated by English Heritage as a Grade II* listed building. The 18th-century stable block and coach house have now been made into three separate dwellings. The grounds also contain a listed ice house and two impressive sets of gates.

== Church of St Margaret ==
The church is thought to date from 1748 and was probably built by John Strahan or William Halfpenny, and is considered to be very similar in conception to Redland Chapel in Bristol which was long considered to be by John Strahan but now known to be by William Halfpenny. It is a Grade I listed building. The interior includes an unusual Royal Arms of the Hanoverians on the Rood.

The church is owned and operated by the St Margaret's, Babington, Charitable Trust, and is licensed for weddings and public worship. The Trust works in partnership with the management of Babington House, which is adjacent, to arrange weddings for Babington House clients in the church. The church is not exclusively for Babington House clients.

Within the churchyard there are a set of three chest tombs. The monument to John Shute is dated 1688 and that to Thomas Branch 1779.

== Charity Cottage ==
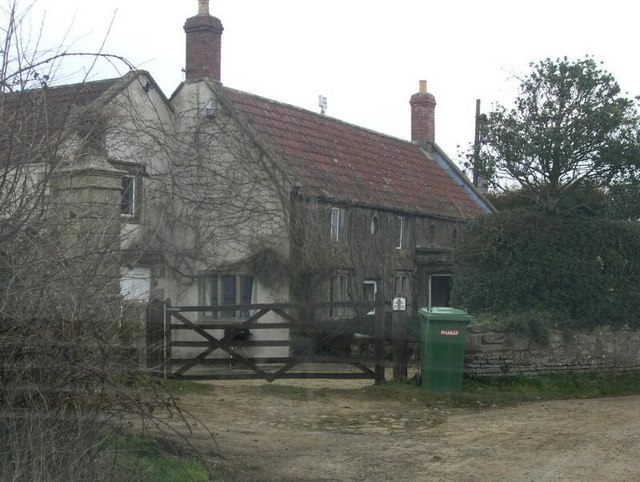
Charity Cottage (or White Cottage) in Charity Lane

Charity Cottage in Charity Lane dates from the 17th century and was built as three cottages, although they have now been converted into one property.
