= St Margaret's Church, Babington =

Church in Somerset, England

Church of St Margaret
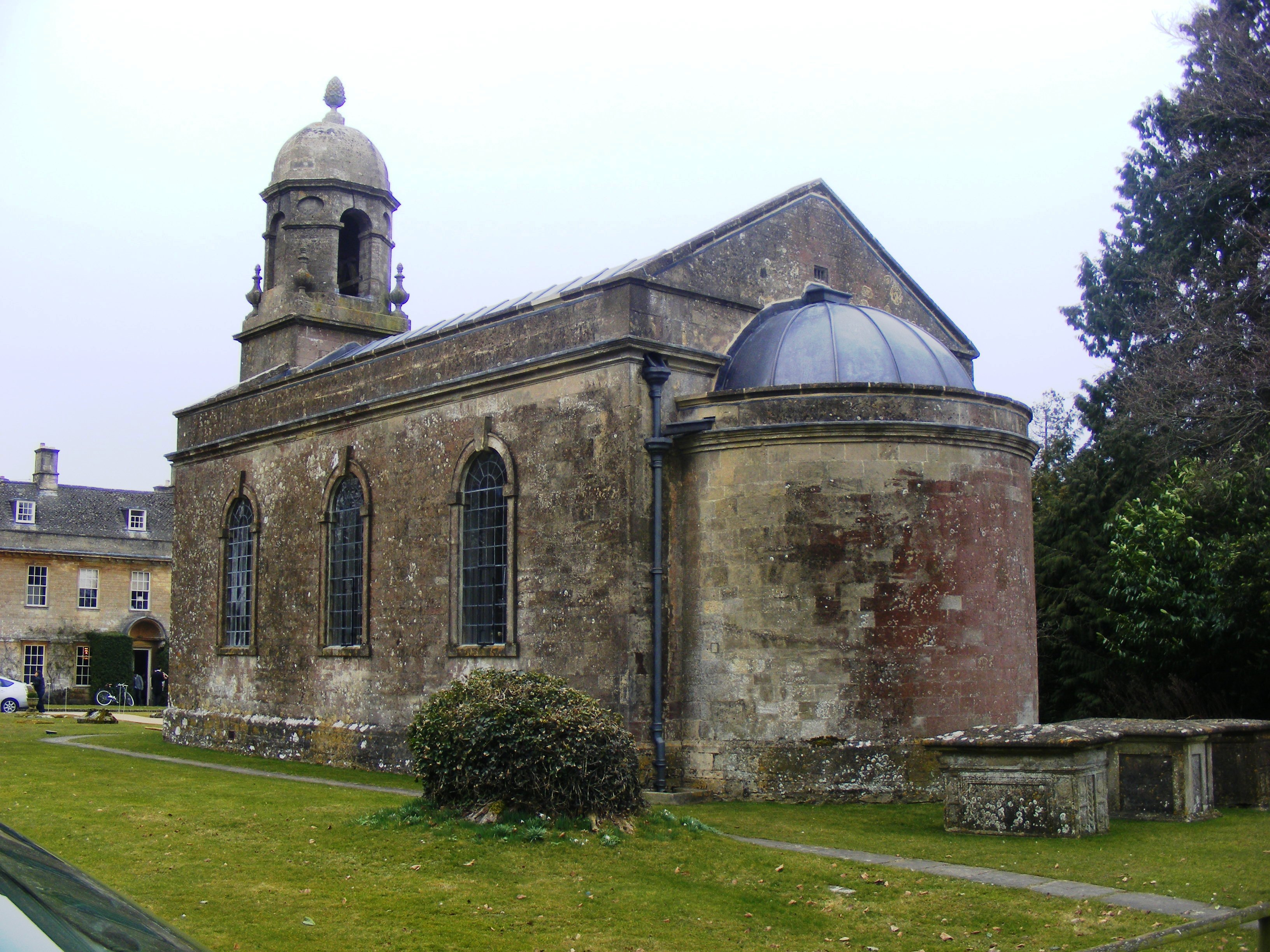

- Location within Somerset

General information
- Location: Babington, England
- Coordinates: 51.257678°N 2.424312°W
- Completed: ca. 1748
- Client: Knatchbull family
- Owner: St Margaret's, Babington, Charitable Trust

Design and construction
- Architect: John Strahan or William Halfpenny

The Church of St Margaret is a Grade I listed building, adjacent to Babington House in Babington, Somerset, England. The church is owned and operated by the St Margaret's, Babington, Charitable Trust, which is completely independent of the management of Babington House.

There may have been a Norman building on the site before the current church, which is thought to date from 1748 and was probably built by John Strahan or William Halfpenny, and is considered to be very similar in conception to Redland Chapel in Bristol, probably by John Strahan but completed by William Halfpenny. The building was commissioned by the Knatchbull family.

The building includes an Apsidal sanctuary and a small west tower with an octagonal cupola. The interior includes an unusual Royal Arms of the Hanoverians on the Rood.

Within the churchyard there are a set of three chest tombs. The monument to John Shute is dated 1688 and that to Thomas Branch 1779.

The church no longer hosts regular services but is licensed for public worship and has a licence allowing the undertaking of Church of England weddings. Certain other ceremonies such as baptisms, funerals etc. can also be performed in the church. The building may also be used for community and cultural purposes. Bookings can be made by contacting the Secretary to the St. Margaret's, Babington, Charitable Trust.

== See also ==
- List of ecclesiastical parishes in the Diocese of Bath and Wells
