= Psychological egoism =

Descriptive ethical view that people are always motivated by self-interest

Psychological egoism is the view that humans are always motivated by self-interest and selfishness, even in what seem to be acts of altruism. It claims that, when people choose to help others, they do so ultimately because of the personal benefits that they expect to obtain, directly or indirectly, from doing so.

This is a descriptive rather than normative view, since it only makes claims about how things are, not how they "ought to be" according to some. It is, however, related to several other normative forms of egoism, such as ethical egoism and rational egoism.

== Subtypes of psychological egoism ==
=== Psychological hedonism ===
A specific form of psychological egoism is psychological hedonism, the view that the ultimate motive for all voluntary human action is the desire to experience pleasure or to avoid pain.

Immediate gratification can be sacrificed for a chance of greater, future pleasure. Further, humans are not motivated strictly to avoid pain and pursue pleasure, but rather humans will endure pain to achieve the greatest net pleasure. Accordingly, all actions are tools for increasing pleasure or decreasing pain, even those defined as altruistic and those that do not cause an immediate change in satisfaction levels.

Elliott Sober argues that psychological egoist, when pressed, often has to resort to hedonism in order to maintain their position, since the supposed pleasure of acting morally can often be the only viable explanation for an altruistic action.

The most famous psychological egoists are Pierre Bayle, and Bernard Mandeville.

=== Final cause ===
Some theorists explain behavior motivated by self-interest without using pleasure and pain as the final causes of behavior.

== Foundations ==
Beginning with ancient philosophy, Epicureanism claims humans live to maximize pleasure. Epicurus argued the theory of human behavior being motivated by pleasure alone is evidenced from infancy to adulthood. Humanity performs altruistic, honorable, and virtuous acts not for the sake of another or because of a moral code but rather to increase the well-being of the self.

In modern philosophy, Jeremy Bentham asserted, like Epicurus, that human behavior is governed by a need to increase pleasure and decrease pain. Bentham explicitly described what types and qualities of pain and pleasure exist, and how human motives are singularly explained using psychological hedonism. Bentham attempted to quantify psychological hedonism. Bentham endeavored to find the ideal human behavior based on hedonic calculus or the measurement of relative gains and losses in pain and pleasure to determine the most pleasurable action a human could choose in a situation.

From an evolutionary perspective, Herbert Spencer, a psychological egoist, argued that all animals primarily seek to survive and protect their lineage. Essentially, the need for the individual and for the individual's immediate family to live supersedes the others' need to live. All species attempt to maximize their own chances of survival and, therefore, well-being. Spencer asserted the best adapted creatures will have their pleasure levels outweigh their pain levels in their environments. Thus, pleasure meant an animal was fulfilling its egoist goal of self survival, and pleasure would always be pursued because species constantly strive for survival.

== Contributions to modern psychology ==
=== Psychoanalysis ===
Whether or not Sigmund Freud was a psychological egoist, his concept of the pleasure principle borrowed much from psychological egoism and psychological hedonism in particular. The pleasure principle rules the behavior of the Id which is an unconscious force driving humans to release tension from unfulfilled desires. When Freud introduced Thanatos and its opposing force, Eros, the pleasure principle emanating from psychological hedonism became aligned with the Eros, which drives a person to satiate sexual and reproductive desires. Alternatively, Thanatos seeks the cessation of pain through death and the end of the pursuit of pleasure: thus, hedonism rules Thanatos, but it centers on the complete avoidance of pain rather than psychological hedonist function which pursues pleasure and avoids pain. Therefore, Freud believed in qualitatively different hedonisms where the total avoidance of pain hedonism and the achievement of the greatest net pleasure hedonism are separate and associated with distinct functions and drives of the human psyche. Although Eros and Thanatos are ruled by qualitatively different types of hedonism, Eros remains under the rule of Jeremy Bentham's quantitative psychological hedonism because Eros seeks the greatest net pleasure.

=== Behaviorism ===
Traditional behaviorism dictates all human behavior is explained by classical conditioning and operant conditioning. Operant conditioning works through reinforcement and punishment which adds or removes pleasure and pain to manipulate behavior. Using pleasure and pain to control behavior means behaviorists assumed the principles of psychological hedonism could be applied to predicting human behavior. For example, Thorndike's law of effect states that behaviors associated with pleasantness will be learned and those associated with pain will be extinguished. Often, behaviorist experiments using humans and animals are built around the assumption that subjects will pursue pleasure and avoid pain. Although psychological hedonism is incorporated into the fundamental principles and experimental designs of behaviorism, behaviorism itself explains and interprets only observable behavior and therefore does not theorize about the ultimate cause of human behavior. Thus, behaviorism uses but does not strictly support psychological hedonism over other understandings of the ultimate drive of human behavior.

== Debate ==
Psychological egoism is controversial. Proponents cite evidence from introspection: reflection on one's own actions may reveal their motives and intended results to be based on self-interest. Psychological hedonists have found through numerous observations of natural human behavior that behavior can be manipulated through reward and punishment, both of which have direct effects of pain and pleasure. Also, the work of some social scientists has empirically supported this theory. Further, they claim psychological egoism posits a theory that is a more parsimonious explanation than competing theories.

Opponents have argued that psychological egoism is not more parsimonious than other theories. For example, a theory that claims altruism occurs for the sake of altruism explains altruism with less complexity than the egoistic approach. The psychological egoist asserts humans act altruistically for selfish reasons even when cost of the altruistic action is far outweighed by the reward of acting selfishly because altruism is performed to fulfill the desire of a person to act altruistically. Other critics argue that it is false either because it is an over-simplified interpretation of behavior or that there exists empirical evidence of altruistic behaviour. Recently, some have argued that evolutionary theory provides evidence against it.

Critics have stated that proponents of psychological egoism often confuse the satisfaction of their own desires with the satisfaction of their own self-regarding desires. Even though it is true that every human being seeks their own satisfaction, this sometimes may only be achieved via the well-being of their neighbor. An example of this situation could be phoning for an ambulance when a car accident has happened. In this case, the caller desires the well-being of the victim, even though the desire itself is the caller's own.

To counter this critique, psychological egoism asserts that all such desires for the well-being of others are ultimately derived from self-interest. For example, German philosopher Friedrich Nietzsche was a psychological egoist for some of his career, though he is said to have repudiated that later in his campaign against morality. He argues in §133 of The Dawn that in such cases compassionate impulses arise out of the projection of our identity unto the object of our feeling. He gives some hypothetical examples as illustrations to his thesis: that of a person, feeling horrified after witnessing a personal feud, coughing blood, or that of the impulse felt to save a person who is drowning in the water. In such cases, according to Nietzsche, there comes into play unconscious fears regarding our own safety. The suffering of another person is felt as a threat to our own happiness and sense of safety, because it reveals our own vulnerability to misfortunes, and thus, by relieving it, one could also ameliorate those personal sentiments. Essentially, proponents argue that altruism is rooted in self-interest whereas opponents claim altruism occurs for altruism's sake or is caused by a non-selfish reason.

=== Max Stirner ===
Stencil drawing of Max Stirner

Philosopher Max Stirner was an advocate for people striving towards ownness, however he rejected the concept of psychological egoism because he believed most people are slaves to a 'spook'- a framework for moral behaviour that can delude our self-interest. Examples of spooks include society and natural rights.

Stirner also uses the example of Juliet from Romeo and Juliet to counter psychological egoism. Juliet kills herself as a sacrifice for others' betterment. She is in love, and knows that by doing this she will leave her self-will unsatisfied, nevertheless she subjects herself to a higher power and prohibits herself from having what she truly wants. This demonstrates how it is possible for a person to act without satisfying one's self-interest.

== Problem of apparent altruism ==
David Hume once wrote, "What interest can a fond mother have in view, who loses her health by assiduous attendance on her sick child, and afterwards languishes and dies of grief, when freed, by its death [the child's], from the slavery of that attendance?". It seems incorrect to describe such a mother's goal as self-interested.

Psychological egoists, however, respond that helping others in such ways is ultimately motivated by some form of self-interest, such as non-sensory satisfaction, the expectation of reciprocation, the desire to gain respect or reputation, or by the expectation of a reward in a putative afterlife. The helpful action is merely instrumental to these ultimately selfish goals.

In the ninth century, Mohammed Ibn Al-Jahm Al-Barmaki (محمد بن الجـَهْم البَرمَكي) has been quoted saying:

"No one deserves thanks from another about something he has done for him or goodness he has done, he is either willing to get a reward from God, therefore he wanted to serve himself, or he wanted to get a reward from people, therefore, he has done that to get profit for himself, or to be mentioned and praised by people, therefore, to it is also for himself, or due to his mercy and tenderheartedness, so he has simply done that goodness to pacify these feelings and treat himself."

This sort of explanation appears to be close to the view of La Rochefoucauld (and perhaps Hobbes).

According to psychological hedonism, the ultimate egoistic motive is to gain good feelings of pleasure and avoid bad feelings of pain. Other, less restricted forms of psychological egoism may allow the ultimate goal of a person to include such things as avoiding punishments from oneself or others (such as guilt or shame) and attaining rewards (such as pride, self-worth, power or reciprocal beneficial action).

Some psychologists explain empathy in terms of psychological hedonism. According to the "merge with others hypothesis", empathy increases the more an individual feels like they are one with another person, and decreases accordingly. Therefore, altruistic actions emanating from empathy, and empathy itself, are caused by making others' interests our own, and the satisfaction of their desires becomes our own, not just theirs. Both cognitive studies and neuropsychological experiments have provided evidence for this theory: as humans increase our oneness with others, our empathy increases, and as empathy increases, so too does our inclination to act altruistically. Neuropsychological studies have linked mirror neurons to humans experiencing empathy. Mirror neurons are activated both when a human (or animal) performs an action and when they observe another human (or animal) perform the same action. Researchers have found that the more these mirror neurons fire the more human subjects report empathy. From a neurological perspective, scientists argue that when a human empathizes with another, the brain operates as if the human is actually participating in the actions of the other person. Thus, when performing altruistic actions motivated by empathy, humans experience someone else's pleasure of being helped. Therefore, in performing acts of altruism, people act in their own self-interest even at a neurological level.

== Criticism ==
=== Circularity ===
Psychological egoism has been accused of being circular: "If a person willingly performs an act, that means he derives personal enjoyment from it; therefore, people only perform acts that give them personal enjoyment." In particular, seemingly altruistic acts must be performed because people derive enjoyment from them and are therefore, in reality, egoistic. This statement is circular because its conclusion is identical to its hypothesis: it assumes that people only perform acts that give them personal enjoyment, and concludes that people only perform acts that give them personal enjoyment. This objection was tendered by William Hazlitt and Thomas Macaulay in the 19th century, and has been restated many times since. An earlier version of the same objection was made by Joseph Butler in the Fifteen Sermons.

Joel Feinberg, in his 1958 paper "Psychological Egoism", embraces a similar critique by drawing attention to the infinite regress of psychological egoism. He expounds it in the following cross-examination:

"All men desire only satisfaction."

"Satisfaction of what?"

"Satisfaction of their desires."

"Their desires for what?"

"Their desires for satisfaction."

"Satisfaction of what?"

"Their desires."

"For what?"

"For satisfaction"—etc., ad infinitum.

=== Evolutionary argument ===
In their 1998 book, Unto Others, Sober and Wilson detailed an evolutionary argument based on the likelihood for egoism to evolve under the pressures of natural selection. Specifically, they focus on the human behavior of parental care. To set up their argument, they propose two potential psychological mechanisms for this. The hedonistic mechanism is based on a parent's ultimate desire for pleasure or the avoidance of pain and a belief that caring for its offspring will be instrumental to that. The altruistic mechanism is based on an altruistic ultimate desire to care for its offspring.

Sober and Wilson argue that when evaluating the likelihood of a given trait to evolve, three factors must be considered: availability, reliability and energetic efficiency. The genes for a given trait must first be available in the gene pool for selection. The trait must then reliably produce an increase in fitness for the organism. The trait must also operate with energetic efficiency to not limit the fitness of the organism. Sober and Wilson argue that there is neither reason to suppose that an altruistic mechanism should be any less available than a hedonistic one nor reason to suppose that the content of thoughts and desires (hedonistic vs. altruistic) should impact energetic efficiency. As availability and energetic efficiency are taken to be equivalent for both mechanisms it follows that the more reliable mechanism will then be the more likely mechanism.

For the hedonistic mechanism to produce the behavior of caring for offspring, the parent must believe that the caring behavior will produce pleasure or avoidance of pain for the parent. Sober and Wilson argue that the belief also must be true and constantly reinforced, or it would not be likely enough to persist. If the belief fails then the behavior is not produced. The altruistic mechanism does not rely on belief; therefore, they argue that it would be less likely to fail than the alternative, i.e. more reliable.

=== Equivocation ===
In philosopher Derek Parfit's 2011 book On What Matters, Volume 1, Parfit presents an argument against psychological egoism that centers around an apparent equivocation between different senses of the word "want":

The word desire often refers to our sensual desires or appetites, or to our being attracted to something, by finding the thought of it appealing. I shall use ‘desire’ in a wider sense, which refers to any state of being motivated, or of wanting something to happen and being to some degree disposed to make it happen, if we can. The word want already has both these senses.

According to Parfit, the argument for psychological egoism fails, because it uses the word want first in the wide sense and then in the narrow sense. If I voluntarily gave up my life to save the lives of several strangers, my act would not be selfish, though I would be doing what in the wide sense I wanted to do.

== See also ==
- Academic careerism
- Acedia
- Enlightened self-interest
- Experience machine
- Inclusive fitness
- Psychological hedonism
- Rational choice model
- Reward system, for a proposed anatomic basis of psychological egoism.
- Simulated reality
