= Redland, Bristol =

Area of Bristol, England

Coordinates: 51.47241°N 2.60321°W

Redland
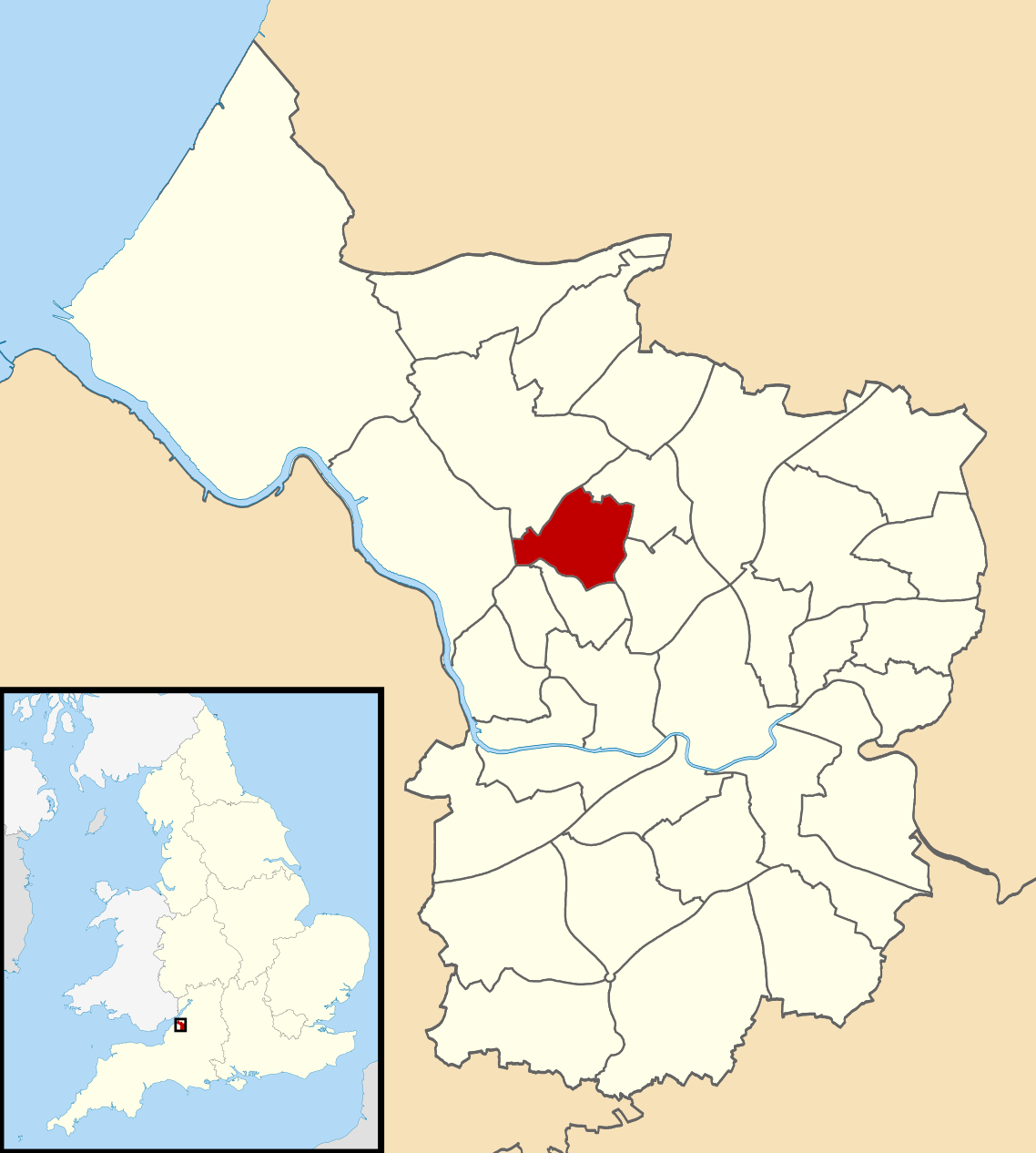
- Boundaries of the city council ward since 2016
- Population: 12,900 (2020)
- OS grid reference: ST582750
- Unitary authority: Bristol
- Region: South West
- Country: England
- Sovereign state: United Kingdom
- Post town: BRISTOL
- Postcode district: BS6
- Dialling code: 0117
- Police: Avon and Somerset
- Fire: Avon
- Ambulance: South Western
- UK Parliament: Bristol Central

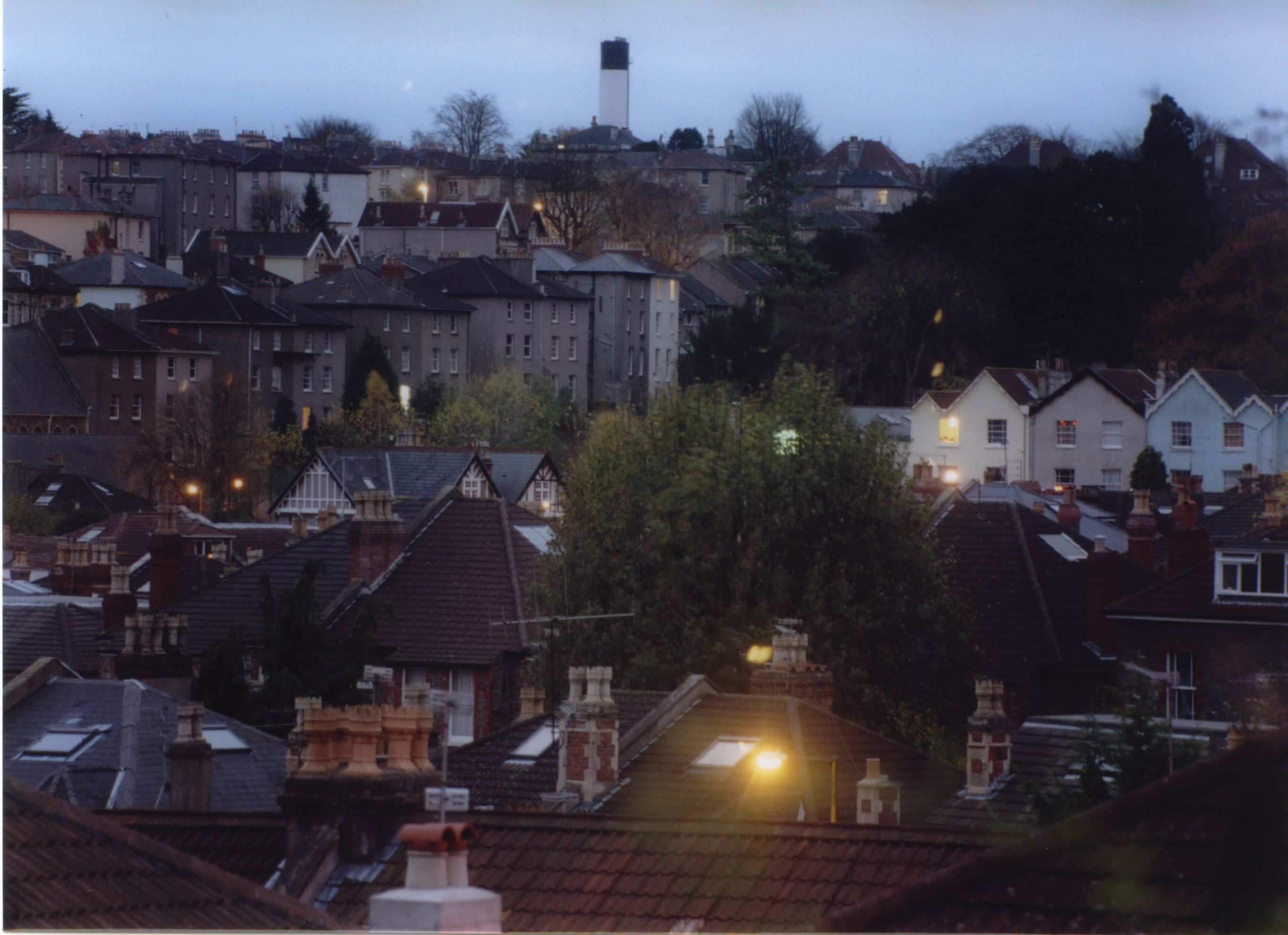
Redland and Kingsdown at dawn

Redland is a neighbourhood in Bristol, England. The neighbourhood is situated between Clifton, Cotham, Bishopston and Westbury Park. The boundaries of the district are not precisely defined, but are generally taken to be Whiteladies Road in the west, the Severn Beach railway line in the south and Cranbrook Road in the east.

Redland is also the name of a council ward, which covers a slightly different area. Redland ward extends to the southern part of Bishopston, and does not include the part of Redland south of Redland Road, which is in Cotham ward.

Redland is primarily residential, and is known as a popular student accommodation area, particularly with second and third year students from the city's university.

Compared to Bristol averages, Redland ward has lower levels of deprivation, relative child poverty, premature mortality and crime. It has higher than average educational attainment, life expectancy, home ownership and car ownership.

== History ==
There are different views of the origin of the name Redland. One source says that in the 11th century it was known as Rudeland, possibly from Old English rudding, meaning "cleared land". Another source points to a mention in 1209 as Thriddeland, probably meaning "the third part of an estate". Yet another source refers to a mention in 1230 of Rubea Terra and a later mention as la Rede Londe, derived from the red colour of the soil, which overlies an outcrop of red marl.

For many centuries Redland was in the large parish of Westbury-on-Trym in Gloucestershire. It became a separate civil parish in 1894, being formed from the part of Westbury on Trym in the county borough of Bristol, on 30 September 1896 the civil parish was abolished and incorporated into Bristol. It remained in the ecclesiastical parish of Westbury-on-Trym until 1942.

In 1732 the Redland estate was acquired by John Cossins (d.1759) from his wife's uncle George Martin. He replaced the old manor house with Redland Court, a house of Classical design. The estate was sold off in 1865. The house and its grounds became part of the newly established Redland High School for Girls, while the rest of the estate was developed for housing.

== Churches ==
The suburb is known for its Georgian parish church Redland Chapel, which was built, probably by John Strahan with plasterwork by Thomas Paty, in 1742 as a private chapel for the local manor house, Redland Court, though it was not consecrated until 1790. It eventually became the parish church when the parish of Redland was separated from Westbury-on-Trym in 1942 and, unusually, has no dedication to a patron saint. It is a Grade I listed building.

The Swedenborgian church in nearby Cranbrook Road was erected in 1899 and has recently closed. The congregation was formed in 1791 and had a church in Terrel Street. The present gothic church was designed by a Mr Paul of Wells Road and was intended to be a lecture hall alongside a larger church that was never built. Neil Marchant wrote a book ' Like A River Flowing' covering the history of this church which can now be found in Bristol central library. The church has been redeveloped for residential use.

Trinity United Reformed Church in Cranbrook Road closed and has been converted into houses. The church began in the recently demolished church hall of 1901 which was demolished for the car park. The main church was built in 1907 to the designs of Phillip Munro in a very Scottish kind of Gothic.

St Catherine's church (Salisbury Road) has been converted to housing. It was erected in 1898 with the intention of a larger church being built alongside. The building is currently a long lancet style with porch - however it closed in the 1950s and was used for storage before being converted to housing.

Redland Park United Reformed Church on the Redland side of Whiteladies Road was founded in 1861 (as Redland Park Congregational Church). The building was destroyed in the Bristol Blitz in 1940, and the new church was opened in 1957. Tyndale Baptist Church, also on the Redland side of Whiteladies Road, was founded in 1867, largely destroyed in the Blitz and rebuilt in 1955.

== Schools ==
Redland is home to Redland Green School, a free academy secondary school opened in 2007 which also contains the secondary campus of Claremont Special School. Bristol Steiner School is also in the ward. Redland formerly contained Redland High School, an independent girls' school which merged with The Red Maids' School in September 2017, to form Redmaids' High School.

St Bonaventure's Catholic Primary School and Bishop Road Primary School are in Redland ward.

== Other listed buildings ==
The architecture of the buildings is generally Georgian but with some Victorian buildings and a small number of mid-twentieth century ones.

Redland Court was built between 1732 and 1735 by John Strahan, for John Cossins, on the site of an Elizabethan House which previously stood on the same site. It is grade II* listed, as are the piers and gates at the main entrance, the perimeter wall, piers and gates to Redland Chapel churchyard and the West gateway and attached garden wall and balustrade.

There are at least twenty individual houses in Redland having grade II or II* listing.

== Transport ==
The southern part of Redland is served by Redland railway station on the Severn Beach line.

Redland is served by bus service 72a operated by First West of England, which runs from Bristol Temple Meads to the University of the West of England's Frenchay Campus via Redland Road and Blackboy Hill. First West of England used to run the bus service 9. Stagecoach service 77 runs between Bristol bus station to Thornbury via Cranbrook Road, supported by financial contributions from both Bristol City Council and South Gloucestershire Council.

== Politics ==
Redland is within the Bristol Central Parliamentary constituency.

Redland ward is in the Bristol City Council jurisdiction and returns two councillors every four years. The incumbents are Fi Hance and Martin Fodor, both of the Green Party.

== Local events ==
At the start of every May a fête is held on Redland Green. This is called the Redland Fair, the Redland May Fair, or simply the May fair, and takes place on the May Day bank holiday.
