= Redland Green =

Park in Bristol, England

Coordinates: 51°28′30″N 2°36′29″W

Redland Green, Bristol

Redland Green is a park in the Bristol suburb of Redland. The park consists of a grassland area and an area of scrub and woodland managed as wildlife habitats by Bristol City Council in partnership with local community groups. A major event each year is Redland May Fair, organised by Redland and Cotham Amenities Society, which has been held annually for over 25 years on the first Monday in May and is opened each year by the Bristol street band The Ambling Band.

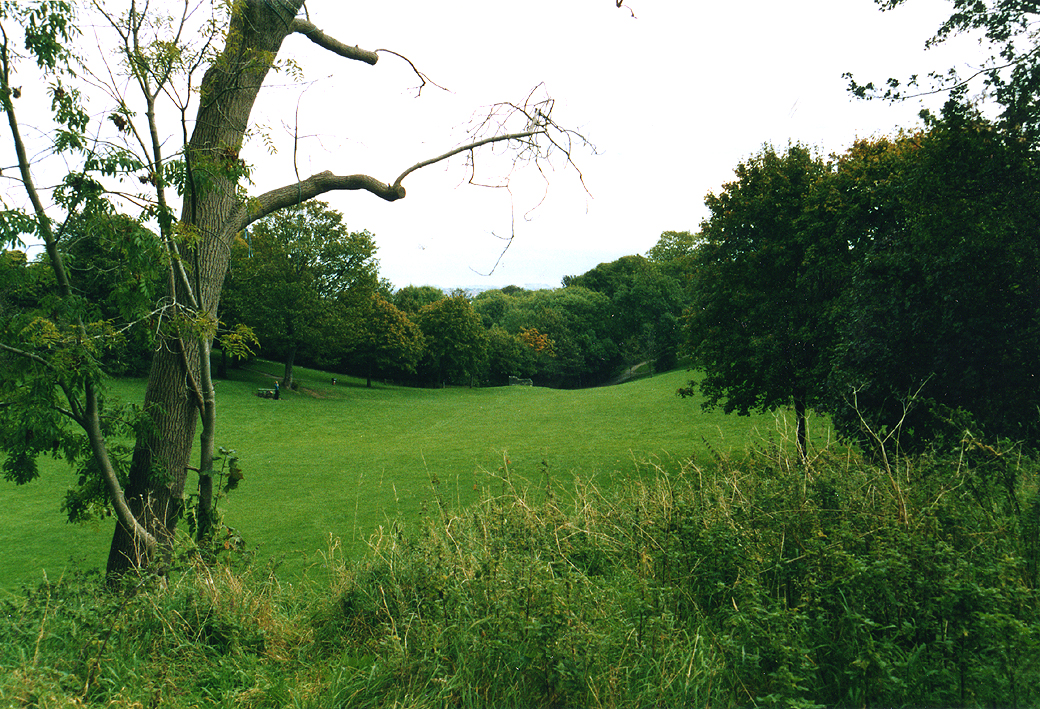
Redland Green, summer 2008.

The green was once farmland, part of the manor of Redland. The name comes from the Latin Rubea Terra and in Norman, la Rede Londe, describing the red soil of the area. The palace of the Bishop of Bristol once stood there, but was destroyed by bombing in World War II. Adjacent to the green are Bristol Lawn Tennis and Squash Club, Redland Green Bowling Club and Redland Green secondary school, and to the north there are allotments. Also adjacent to Redland Green is Redland Parish Church, a Georgian place of worship, built in 1742. It is a Grade I listed building, and was previously the chapel of local manor house, Redland Court, which is why it is not dedicated to any particular saint.

The park consists of a grassed area and a larger area of scrub and woodland managed by Bristol City Council, in partnership with local community groups, to encourage biodiversity. The park is open all year round and includes a picnic area with picnic benches and a playground with equipment, including a climbing frame, swings, a roundabout, a sandpit and a zip wire.
