= Kirsty Young =

Scottish television radio presenter

- Born: Kirsty Jackson Young; East Kilbride, Lanarkshire, Scotland
- Occupations: Television and radio presenter
- Years active: 1989–present
- Spouse: Nick Jones (m. 1999)
- Children: 2

Kirsty Jackson Young is a Scottish television and radio presenter.

From 2006 to 2018 she was the main presenter of BBC Radio 4's Desert Island Discs. She presented Crimewatch on BBC One from 2008 to 2015.

== Early life ==
Young was born in East Kilbride. She attended Cambusbarron Primary School and Stirling High School. She returned in June 2008 to officially open the school's new building. On the first episode of her first TV show she shared with viewers that she had suffered from bulimia as a teenager. In a later interview she said "It only happened for a very fleeting few months and I dealt with it myself."

Young failed to get the exam result required for university. Instead she did odd jobs including a runner and then a researcher for her sister's boyfriend's TV company.

== Career ==
Young became a continuity announcer for BBC Radio Scotland in 1989. In 1992, she moved to Scottish Television as a presenter of Scotland Today, which resulted in her chat show Kirsty. She left Scotland Today in 1996 to become a relief presenter for The Time, The Place and appeared on the Holiday programme. She co-hosted a consumer show, The Street, on BBC Two.

In March 1997, she joined the news team of the new terrestrial channel Channel 5, presenting its flagship news programme Channel 5 News. In 1999, Young competed in the first Celebrity Stars in their Eyes, winning the competition with her Peggy Lee impersonation, singing the hit "Fever". Young then left Channel 5 to join ITV in 2000 and briefly hosted the quiz show The People Versus. In 2001, she became a co-presenter of the ITV Evening News. Later the same year, after giving birth to her first child, she decided to return to Channel 5 to again front Channel 5 News from 14 January 2002.

In 2004, Young made an appearance on Room 101, during which she nominated cowboy boots, Britney Spears, Brazilian waxes and 'baby on board' stickers among her pet hates.

In June 2006, Young was announced as the new presenter of the long-running BBC Radio 4 programme Desert Island Discs, replacing Sue Lawley; she began on 1 October 2006. According to the odds given by bookmaker William Hill she was an outsider for the job at 20/1. She returned to Five News on 28 September 2006, but in 2007 Young announced that she would be leaving Channel 5 News in the autumn, following ten years as its head anchor since the programme's inception on the same day as Channel 5's launch (30 March), a decade earlier. On 29 August 2007, she presented her last show.

On 29 September, a month after leaving Channel 5, the BBC announced that Young would succeed Fiona Bruce as the presenter of Crimewatch. She presented the show from January 2008 until December 2015.

From 11 January 2010, she presented a four-part BBC TV series entitled The British Family. In March–April 2011, she presented the TV series The British at Work.

On 31 August 2018, it was announced that Young would be stepping down from Desert Island Discs "for a number of months" to receive treatment for a form of fibromyalgia, and that Lauren Laverne would deputise during this period. In July 2019, Young announced that she was to stand down as the host of Desert Island Discs, saying: "Having been forced to take some months away from my favourite job because of health problems, I'm happy to say I'm now well on the way to feeling much better. But that enforced absence from the show has altered my perspective on what I should do next and so I've decided it's time to pursue new challenges". The BBC's director of Radio and Education, James Purnell, called Young a "wonderful host". It was confirmed that Lauren Laverne of Radio 6 Music would be continuing in Young's role "for the foreseeable future".

On 2 June 2022, Young presented Platinum Beacons: Lighting up the Jubilee, BBC One's live coverage of the lighting of more than 1,500 beacons to celebrate the Queen's 70-year reign.

Young fronted the later part of the BBC's television coverage of the state funeral of Elizabeth II at St George's Chapel, Windsor Castle, on 19 September 2022. She received praise for her closing monologue at the end of the broadcast.

Until 2025, Young has presented Young Again on BBC Radio 4, in which Young interviews notable guests about what they would tell their younger selves.

In May 2026, Young hosted David Attenborough’s 100 Years on Planet Earth, a 90-minute concert at The Royal Albert Hall that celebrated Sir David's life and his groundbreaking natural history career.

== Personal life ==
Young dated Kenny Logan for three years until 1999.

Young married businessman Nick Jones, the founder of Soho House club, in September 1999 at Babington House, near Frome, Somerset. She has two daughters with Jones and a stepdaughter and a stepson from Jones's first marriage. The couple have lived in Bampton, Oxfordshire, since 2011.

Young and her husband purchased Inchconnachan, an island in Loch Lomond, with the intention of building holiday lets on the island. The island is the home of a colony of wild wallabies that has lived on the island for 80 years. To make way for the holiday lets, Young and her husband considered relocating the wallabies, although this has seen some opposition. The island is an area of special scientific interest and conservation area, thus their development plans attracted criticism from local conservationists in 2022.

=== Health ===
On Christmas Day 2022, Young appeared as the “castaway” on Desert Island Discs, the programme that she had hosted up until 2018, when she stepped down for health reasons, suffering from fibromyalgia and rheumatoid arthritis. She chose as her luxury item a home cinema with access to every film she had ever watched.

In an interview on 8 August 2024 with Emma Barnett, Young said she was living in chronic pain and said she felt a sense of "failure and shame", as well as a reluctance to talk about it to other people. She said that living with her chronic pain could make her feel 'hollowed out' and to lose her sense of self. Young supported self-management techniques to help live with chronic pain.

== Appointments ==
In 2016 Young was appointed president of UNICEF UK; she was succeeded in 2020 by actress Olivia Colman.

In October 2019 she was appointed as a director of Sussex Royal, "The Foundation of the Duke and Duchess of Sussex", and served until the foundation was dissolved in July 2020.

Preceded by Fiona Bruce	Host of Crimewatch; 2008–2015	Succeeded by Jeremy Vine
Preceded by None	Host of The People Versus; 2000	Succeeded by Kaye Adams
Preceded by Sue Lawley	Presenter of Desert Island Discs; 2006–2018	Succeeded by Lauren Laverne
