= Lectionary 189 =

Lectionary ℓ 189
- New Testament manuscript
- Text: Evangelistarion †
- Date: 12th century
- Script: Greek
- Now at: British Library
- Size: 28.2 cm by 22 cm

Lectionary 189, designated by siglum ℓ 189 (in the Gregory-Aland numbering) is a Greek manuscript of the New Testament, on parchment leaves. Palaeographically it has been assigned to the 12th century. Scrivener labelled it by 261^{evl}.

== Description ==
The codex contains Lessons from the Gospels of John, Matthew, Luke lectionary (Evangelistarium) with lacunae at the beginning. 1-8 leaves at the beginning were supplemented by a later hand on paper in the 14th century. It also contains lessons from the Prophets and Epistles, and a catechism at the end (leaves 235–236). The text is written in Greek minuscule letters, on 236 parchment leaves (28.2 cm by 22 cm), in two columns per page, 22 lines per page. It contains musical notes in red.

There are daily lessons from Easter to Pentecost.

== History ==
Usually it is dated to the 12th century. The manuscript once belonged to Bishop Butler's collection. It was purchased for the British Museum in 1786.

The manuscript was examined by Bloomfield. It was added to the list of New Testament manuscripts by Scrivener (number 261). Gregory saw it in 1883.

The manuscript is not cited in the critical editions of the Greek New Testament (UBS3).

Currently the codex is located in the British Library (Add. 11840) in London.

== See also ==
- List of New Testament lectionaries
- Biblical manuscript
- Textual criticism
- Lectionary 190
- Lectionary 191
- Lectionary 188

== Bibliography ==
- Gregory, Caspar René (1900). Textkritik des Neuen Testaments. Vol. 1. Leipzig. p. 403.
