= William Halfpenny =

British architect

- Died: 1755
- Occupation: Architect
- Buildings: Coopers' Hall, Bristol

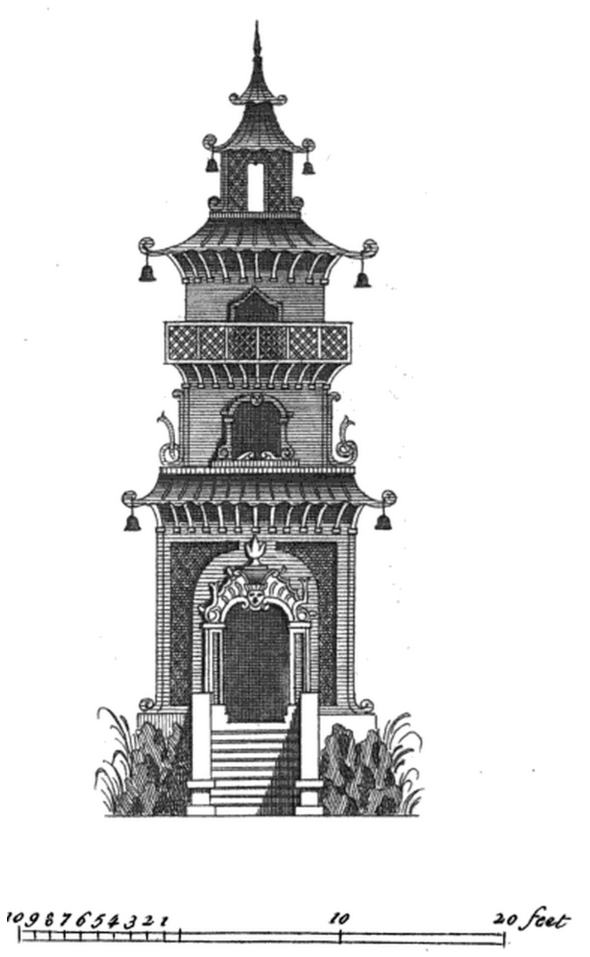
Plate 55, "The Elevation of a Chinese Gazebo", from Rural Architecture in the Chinese Taste, 1755, in which the word "gazebo" is first recorded in English

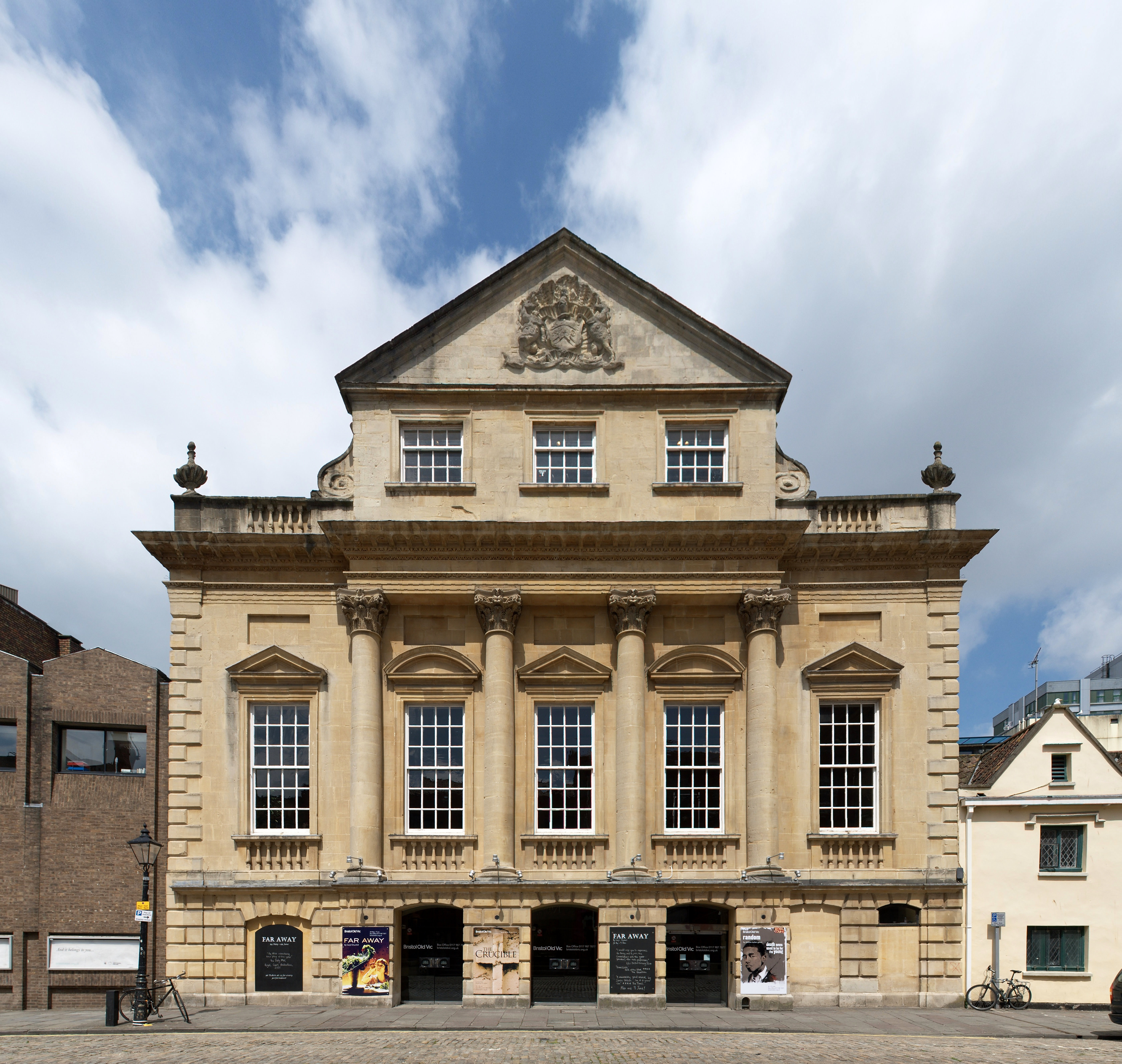
The Coopers' Hall, Bristol, one of the largest and most certain attributions to Halfpenny

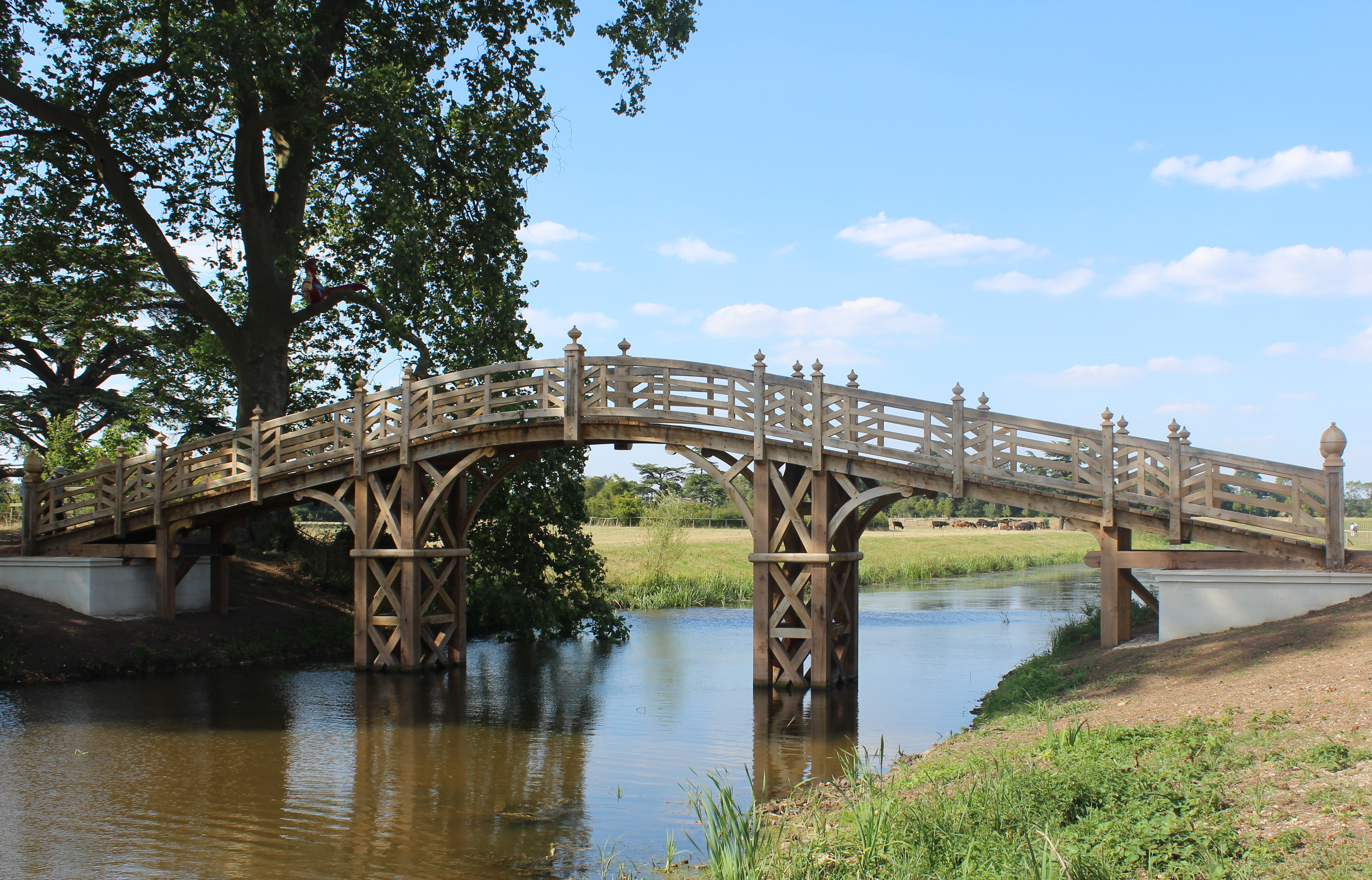
The recreated Chinese Bridge at Croome Court, to Halfpenny's design

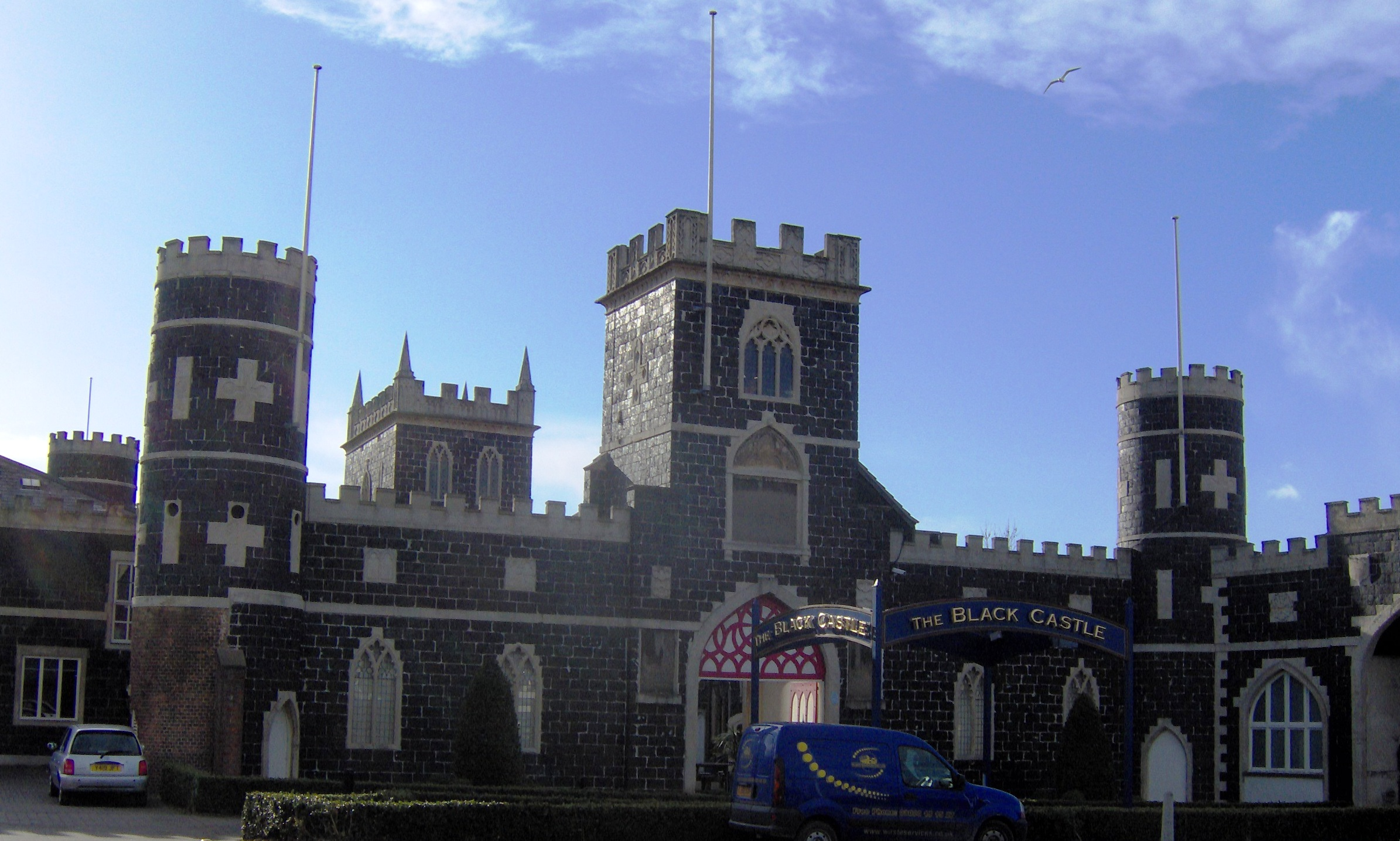
Black Castle, Bristol, perhaps by Halfpenny

William Halfpenny (active 1723–1755) was an English architect and builder in the first half of the 18th century, and prolific author of builder's pattern books. In some of his publications he described himself as "architect and carpenter", and his books concentrate on the practical information a builder would need, as well as addressing "gentleman draughtsmen" designing their own houses. They were a popular alternative to the very expensive architectural treatises by British authors such as Colen Campbell and James Gibbs, or foreigners such as Serlio or Palladio (Halfpenny published a short work "correcting" some of the latter's mistakes).

He also used the alias of Michael Hoare, particularly while in Ireland.

== Early life and career ==
Little is known for certain of his life, but he seems to have been based in Richmond, then in Surrey, and nearby London, perhaps also spending a period based in Bristol. He also worked in Ireland at the same times as, and possibly under Edward Lovett Pearce. Few buildings can certainly be ascribed to him, and no major ones; then and now his main importance lies in his books, which were often reprinted, and copied by other authors. They reached British North America and were also influential there. He wrote and probably built in collaboration with his son John Halfpenny in the later years of his career. Several of his later books are on architecture in the "Gothick" and "Chinese taste", as are several of the buildings attributed to him.

== Architectural work ==
In 1723, he was paid for a design for Holy Trinity Church, Leeds which was never executed, and his book Practical Architecture (1724) was dedicated to Yorkshire landowner and Member of Parliament Sir Thomas Frankland. The Art of Sound Building (1725) was dedicated to the Parliamentary official Sir Andrew Fountaine, and in 1726 he submitted a design for a bridge across the River Thames at Fulham. Batty Langley mentions him in his book Ancient Masonry (1736) as "Mr William Halfpenny, alias Hoare, lately of Richmond in Surrey, carpenter."

Halfpenny worked for a time in Ireland, in 1732 designing a horse barracks in Hillsborough, County Down, for Lord Hillsborough, and in 1737 Garrahunden House, later demolished, near Bagenalstown, County Carlow, for Sir Richard Butler. In 1739 he made designs for buildings in Waterford and Cork.

Most of Halfpenny's buildings, including several that may have been designed by him or his contemporaries, are or were located in and around Bristol, where he was probably based from about 1730 (his Perspective Made Easy, published in 1731, contains various views of the city). The Coopers' Hall, King Street, built from his designs in 1743–4, is the most notable and the only surviving building in the area which can positively be identified as his work. The coopers relinquished it in 1785, and it was later used as assembly rooms, warehouses and a Baptist chapel. Since 1972, the ground floor has formed the main entrance to the Bristol Old Vic theatre, and the upper floors house various theatre facilities.

Only one other work which can be positively identified as Halfpenny's and of which traces survive is a "Chinese" bridge built for Lord Deerhurst (later the sixth Earl of Coventry) at Croome Park, Worcestershire in 1747–48. Archaeology students at the University of Worcester uncovered the substantial stone foundations of the bridge in summer 2009, and the National Trust built a replica of the bridge, using Halfpenny's drawing, as part of a plan to recreate Capability Brown's original landscape.

He died in debt in 1755.

== Buildings tentatively attributed to Halfpenny on stylistic grounds ==
- King House, Boyle, County Roscommon, (1720–1730)
- The Ivy, Bath Road, Chippenham, Wiltshire (built for John Norris M.P. (died 1752) in 1728)
- Frampton Court, Frampton-on-Severn, Gloucestershire (1731–33)
- Redland Chapel in the Bristol suburbs has been attributed to Halfpenny, but it is more likely to have been designed by John Strahan, the architect of Redland Court (now Redland High School for Girls), who died before the chapel had been completed. Halfpenny was recruited in 1742 to oversee the remaining work.
- No.3, Clifton Hill, Clifton, Bristol, previously known as Clifton Court and now a nursing-home called Chesterfield (1742), a Grade II* listed building
- Stouts Hill, near Uley, Gloucestershire (1743)
- Black Castle Public House, Brislington, Bristol (1745–55)
- Church of St Margaret, Babington, Somerset (c1748)
- an orangery or Gothick garden house, The Green, Frampton-on-Severn (c1750)
- Upton House near Tetbury, Gloucestershire (1752)

== Publications ==
His books deal almost entirely with domestic architecture, and especially with country houses in the neo-Gothic and Chinoiserie fashions which were so greatly in vogue in the middle of the 18th century. His most important publications from the point of view of their effect upon taste, all of them published in London and many reprinted during Halfpenny's lifetime, were:

- Practical Architecture, or a sure guide to the true working according to the rules of that science (ca 1724)
- (As 'Michael Hoare') The Builder's Pocket Companion (1728, 1731 etc.)
- The Art of Sound Building, demonstrated in Geometrical Problems (1732, 2nd ed. 1736, etc.)
- A New And Complete System of Architecture Delineated; (1749, 1759 etc.)
- (with John Halfpenny) New Designs for Chinese Temples, in four parts (1750–52)
- Rural Architecture in the Chinese Taste (1750). This book is believed to have introduced the word "gazebo" to the English language.
- Rural Architecture in the Gothick Taste (1752). This is essentially an expansion of Rural Architecture in the Chinese Taste
- Chinese and Gothic Architecture Properly Ornamented (1752)
- (with John Halfpenny) The Country Builder's Pocket Companion and Builder's assistant for Rural Decoraytive Architecture (1753, 1756)

Several books were produced in collaboration with his son John Halfpenny. New Designs for Chinese Temples was a volume of some significance in the history of furniture, since, having been published some years before the books of Thomas Chippendale and Sir William Chambers, it disproved the statement so often made that those designers introduced the Chinese taste into Britain. Halfpenny stated distinctly that "the Chinese manner" had been "already introduced here with success."

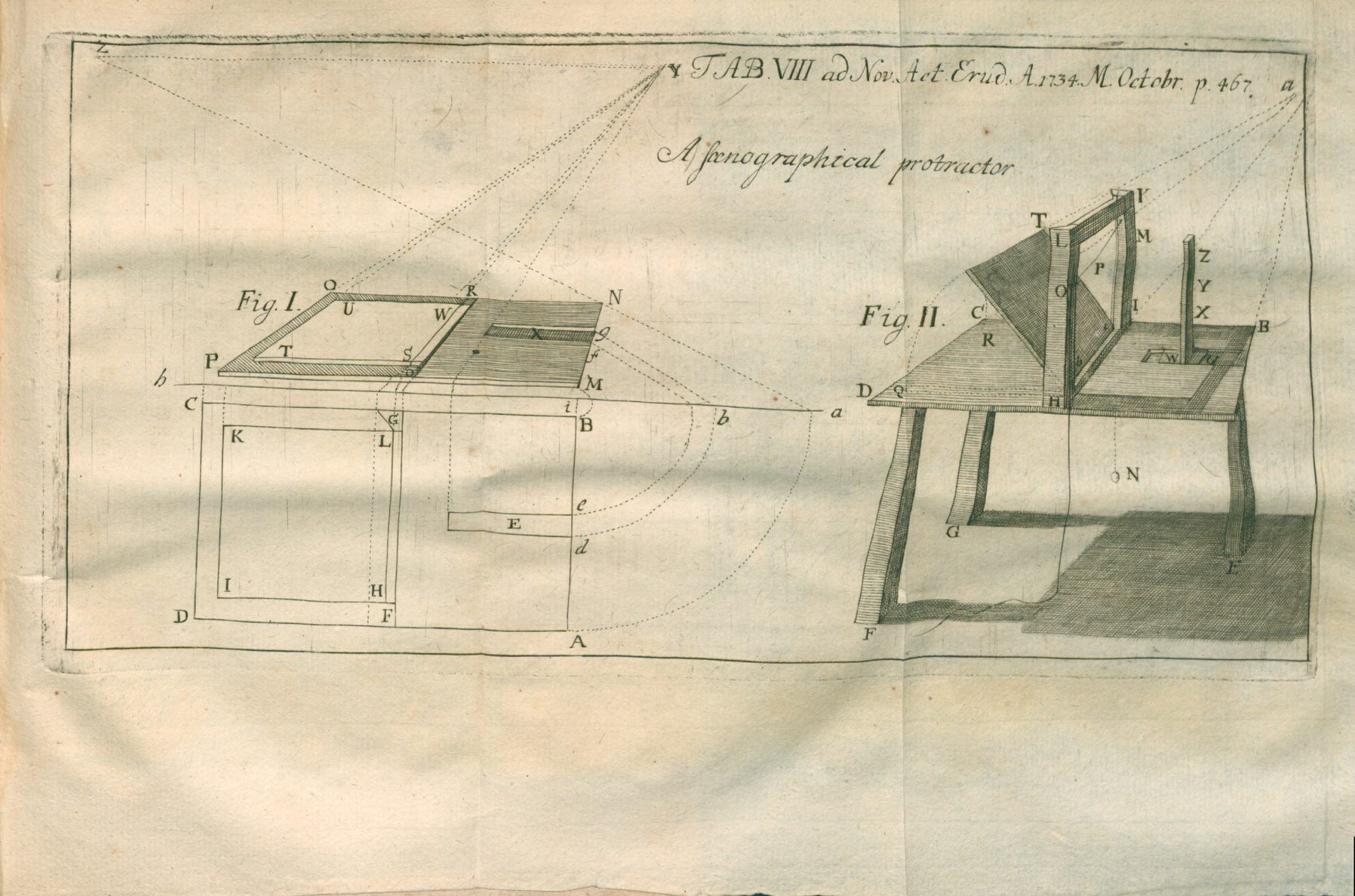
Illustration from critique of Halfpenny's Perspectiva facilitata published in 1734 Acta Eruditorum

Halfpenny's books were often the source for design details in 18th-century American houses as well, including Mount Clare in Baltimore County, Maryland, and the Chase–Lloyd House in Annapolis, Maryland.
