= Lectionary 191 =

Lectionary ℓ 191
- New Testament manuscript
- Text: Evangelistarion †
- Date: 12th century
- Script: Greek
- Now at: British Library
- Size: 27.5 cm by 21.5 cm

Lectionary 191, designated by siglum ℓ 191 (in the Gregory-Aland numbering) is a Greek manuscript of the New Testament, on parchment leaves. Palaeographically it has been assigned to the 12th century. Scrivener labelled it by 263^{evl}.

== Description ==
The codex contains Lessons from the Gospels of John, Matthew, Luke lectionary (Evangelistarium), on 297 parchment leaves (27.5 cm by 21.5 cm), with lacunae at the end. It contains also one older leaf with the text from the Prophets (Zephaniah 2:11—Haggai 1:5). It is written in Greek minuscule letters, in two columns per page, 25 lines per page.

There are weekday Gospel lessons.

== History ==
Usually it is dated to the 12th century. The manuscript once belonged to Arundel collection. Sotheby bought it for the British Museum in 1850.

The manuscript was examined by Bloomfield. It was added to the list of New Testament manuscripts by Scrivener (number 263). Gregory saw it in 1883.

The manuscript is sporadically cited in the critical editions of the Greek New Testament (UBS3).

Currently the codex is located in the British Library (Add MS 18212) in London.

== See also ==
- List of New Testament lectionaries
- Biblical manuscript
- Textual criticism
- Lectionary 190
- Lectionary 192

== Bibliography ==
- Gregory, Caspar René (1900). Textkritik des Neuen Testaments, Vol. 1. Leipzig. p. 403.
