= Lectionary 190 =

Lectionary ℓ 190
- New Testament manuscript
- Text: Evangelistarion †
- Date: 11th century
- Script: Greek
- Now at: British Library
- Size: 31.8 cm by 23 cm

Lectionary 190, designated by siglum ℓ 190 (in the Gregory-Aland numbering) is a Greek manuscript of the New Testament, on parchment leaves. Palaeographically it has been assigned to the 11th century. The manuscript is very lacunose. Scrivener labelled it by 262^{evl}.

== Description ==
Only one parchment leaf (31.8 cm by 23 cm) of the codex has survived. It contains a lesson from Matthew 6:14-21. It was bound with another codex. It contains lessons from the Prophets and Epistles, and catechism at the end (leaves 235-236).

The text is written in Greek minuscule letters, in two columns per page, 16 lines per page, in 6-10 letters. The letters are large.

Two other leaves (27.6 cm by 20.1 cm) with lessons from Luke 24:25-35 and John 1:35-51, are written in one column per page, 21 lines per page.

== History ==
Usually it is dated to the 11th century. Formerly the manuscript was housed in Alexandria. It was presented for the British Museum in 1848.

The manuscript was examined by Bloomfield. It was added to the list of New Testament manuscripts by Scrivener (number 262). Gregory saw it in 1883.

The manuscript is not cited in the critical editions of the Greek New Testament (UBS3).

Currently the codex is located in the British Library (Add MS 17370) in London.

== See also ==
- List of New Testament lectionaries
- Biblical manuscript
- Textual criticism
- Lectionary 191
- Lectionary 189

== Bibliography ==
- Gregory, Caspar René (1900). Textkritik des Neuen Testaments. Vol. 1. Leipzig. p. 403.
