= Babington House =

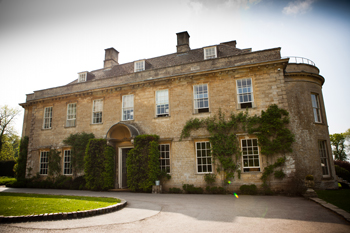
- Babington House

- Location within Mendip
- 51°15′28.7″N 2°25′30.3″W
- Location: Babington, Somerset, England

History
- Built: 1705

Listed Building – Grade II*
- Official name: Babington House
- Designated: 11 March 1968
- Reference no.: 1177567

National Register of Historic Parks and Gardens
- Official name: Babington House
- Type: Grade II
- Designated: 1 June 1984
- Reference no.: 1001137

Babington House is a Grade II* listed manor house, located in the village of Babington, between Radstock and Frome, in the county of Somerset, England.

Converted to a private members' club and hotel by Nick Jones, it is currently owned by Soho House Ltd. Since 1999 it has hosted many celebrity weddings.

== History ==
The village of Babington dates from medieval times. Its name derives from the Babington family, who were once associated with the village, but it appears to have been for the most part demolished to make way for the house around 1705.

The manor was sold by Thomas and Mary Mankham to Joan Elcode, a widow, according to a deed dated Easter 1572. The estate then contained seven messuages, one cottage, 10 tofts, one water mill, 10 gardens, 14 orchards, 300 acres (121 hectares) of land, 120 acres (49 ha) of meadow, 160 acres (65 ha) of pasture, 20 acres (8 ha) of wood and 120 acres (49 ha) of furze and carried an annual rent of 4 shillings and 1 pound (450 g) of pepper.

The estate passed through several hands until it was forfeited to the Crown in 1593. By the late 17th century, the manor belonged to Thomas Pacey who left it to his sister, Margaret. She was married to a Bristol alderman, William Crabb, and subsequently passed the manor on to their eldest daughter, Elizabeth, wife of Henry Mompesson of Corston, Wiltshire (1633–1715) who was Sheriff of Somerset in 1698.

The current house was built around 1705 for Henry Mompesson, probably on the foundations of an earlier building which would have been owned by the Babington family. It has since been extensively altered and extended, including in 1790, possibly by John Pinch the elder, for Captain Charles Knatchbull, who had inherited it via Mrs Elizabeth Long, a niece of the Mompessons.

Babington was inhabited by successive members of the Knatchbull family until the house and immediate grounds were sold following the death in 1951 of Mrs Knatchbull, the widow of Wyndham Knatchbull (1829–1900), a captain of the 3rd Dragoon Guards. Mrs Knatchbull was better known under her maiden name as the pianist and composer Dora Bright. In April 1939, BBC Radio broadcast a concert of her playing from Babington House.

Adjacent to Babington House is the Grade I listed Church of St Margaret, which is owned and operated by the St. Margaret's, Babington, Charitable Trust. The Grounds of Babington House are listed Grade II in the Register of Historic Parks and Gardens of special historic interest in England.

== Hotel and private members' club ==
In 1998, Nick Jones, who had founded the Soho House club in Soho, London bought the property. He converted it to a hotel, club and wedding venue for the London members of the Soho House club, as well as for new Somerset members. The property is also part-owned by actor Neil Morrissey.

In that year, Jones was cautioned by police after eleven Polish illegal immigrants were found working at the hotel.

Wedding ceremonies are performed in St Margaret's Church or in the orangery. Weddings for non-members are allowed.

=== Notable weddings held at Babington House ===
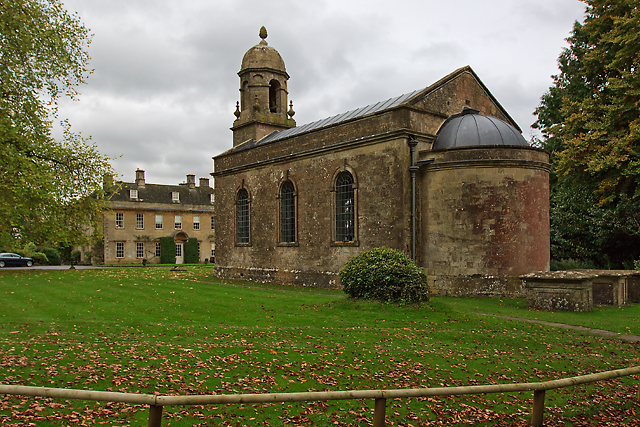
Church of St Margaret and Babington House

- Fat Boy Slim and Zoë Ball, August 1999
- Nick Jones and Kirsty Young, 30 September 1999
- Nirpal Singh Dhaliwal and Liz Jones, 2002
- John Thomson and Samantha Sharp (reception only), May 2005
- Natasha Kaplinsky and Justin Bower, 21 August 2005
- Lucy Benjamin and Richard Taggart, 30 March 2006
- Angela Griffin and Jason Milligan, 31 July 2006
- Clive Standen and wife Francesca, 2007
- Richard Bacon and Rebecca McFarlane (reception only), 17 January 2008
- Danny Goffey and Pearl Lowe, 4 December 2008
- Amanda Holden and Chris Hughes, 10 December 2008
- Jenni Falconer and James Midgley, 3 June 2010
- Damien Duff and wife Elaine (reception only), 17 June 2010
- Amanda Lamb and Sean McGuinness, June 2012
- Sam Taylor-Wood and Aaron Taylor-Johnson, 21 June 2012
- James Corden and Julia Carey, 15 September 2012
- Jamie Dornan and Amelia Warner, 2013
- Katherine Kingsley and Dominic Tighe, 25 June 2013
- Professor Green and Millie Mackintosh, 10 September 2013
- Lucie Cave and Ben Lunt, 4 September 2014
- Eddie Redmayne and Hannah Bagshawe, 15 December 2014
- Tanya Burr and Jim Chapman, September 2015
- Michael Arden and Andy Mientus, 18 August 2016
- Chris Hayden and Mairead Nash, the former drummer and the manager of Florence and the Machine, 22 September 2016
- Eoin Morgan and Tara Ridgway, November 2018

== Grounds ==
To the north of the House are lawns planted with 19th-century specimen deciduous and coniferous trees and ornamental shrubberies. From here there are views north and northeast across the park beyond the former northwest drive towards the grounds of Ammerdown House, Kilmersdon.

Within the grounds a chain of five informal pools lies in a shallow valley about 70 metres (230 ft) west of the House. The pools are surrounded by mixed specimen trees and shrubberies. A walk on the western side of the pools leads to a kitchen garden southwest of the House.

== Architecture ==
The house of mainly Georgian architecture has been designated by English Heritage as a Grade II* listed building. The 18th-century stable block and coach house have now been made into three separate dwellings. The grounds also contain a listed ice house and two sets of gates, which are Grade II listed.
