= Andrew Baxter (metaphysician) =

Scottish metaphysician

Andrew Baxter (1686/1687, Aberdeen – 23 April 1750, Whittingehame, East Lothian) was a Scottish metaphysician.

== Life ==
Baxter was educated at King's College, University of Aberdeen. He maintained himself by acting as tutor to noblemen's sons. From 1741 to 1747 he lived with Lord Blantyre and Mr Hay of Drummelzier at Utrecht, and made excursions in Flanders, France and the Holy Roman Empire. Returning to Scotland, he lived at Whittingehame, near Edinburgh, until his death in 1750. At Spa he had met John Wilkes, then twenty years old, and formed a lasting friendship with him.

== Writings ==
Baxter's chief work, An Inquiry into the Nature of the Human Soul (editions 1733, 1737 and 1745; with appendix added in 1750 in answer to an attack in Maclaurin's Account of Sir I. Newton's Philosophical Discoveries, and dedication to John Wilkes), examines the properties of matter. It described the one essential property of matter as its inactivity, vis inertiae (accepted later by Monboddo). All movement in matter is, therefore, caused by some immaterial force, namely, God. But the movements of the body are not analogous to the movements of matter; they are caused by a special immaterial force, the soul. The soul, as being immaterial, is immortal, and its consciousness does not depend upon its connection with the body. He claimed the argument was supported by an analysis of the phenomena of dreams, which are ascribed to direct spiritual influences. Lastly Baxter attempted to prove that matter is finite.

Baxter's Inquiry met rather different reactions. E.g. it was criticized by Benjamin Franklin in a letter which pointed on Baxter's lack of understand in mechanics, yet left a lasting impression on Samuel Taylor Coleridge, who said, 'I should not wonder if I found that Andrew had thought more on the subject of Dreams than any other of our Psychologists, Scotch or English'.

His work is an attack on John Toland's Letters to Serena (1704), which argued that motion is essential to matter, and on Locke and Berkeley. His criticism of Berkeley (in the second volume) is, however, based on the common misinterpretation of his theory. Sir Leslie Stephen described him as a curious example of "the effects of an exploded metaphysics on a feeble though ingenious intellect".

Baxter's ideas on dreams were contested by Thomas Branch in his Thoughts on Dreaming (1738).

== Works ==
- Some Reflections on a late Pamphlet called, The State of the Moral World Considered, 1732
- An enquiry into the nature of the human soul; wherein the immateriality of the soul is evinced from the principles of reason and philosophy, 1733
- Matho; or, The cosmotheoria puerilis, 1740
