= Rosewell House =

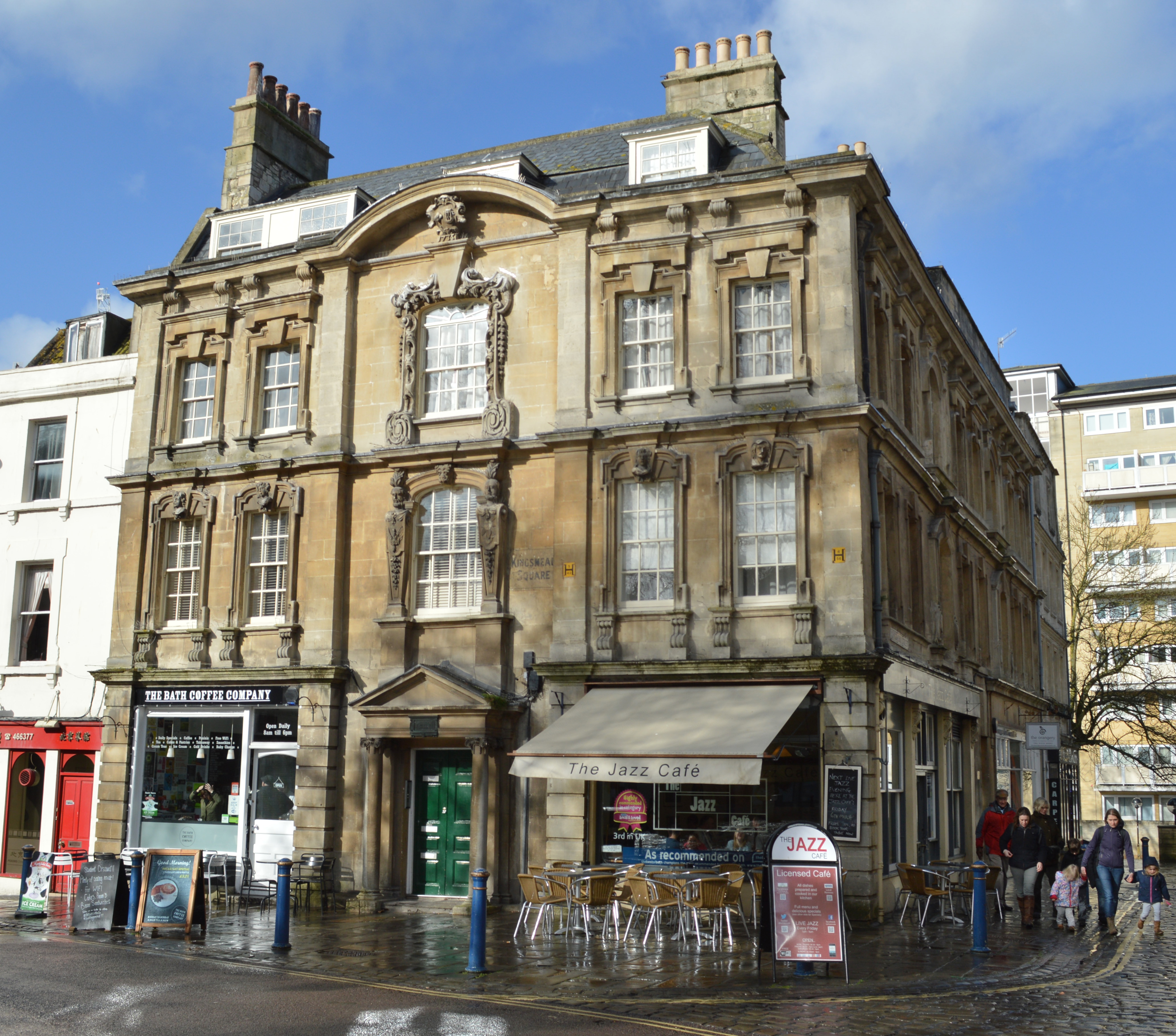
- The building in 2015

- Location within England Location within Somerset
- 51.38139°N 2.363481°W
- Location: Kingsmead Square, Bath, England

History
- Built: 1763 (263 years ago)

Site notes
- Architect: John Strahan

Listed Building – Grade I
- Official name: Rosewell House (number 12 to 14)
- Designated: 12 June 1950
- Reference no.: 1394043

Rosewell House is a historic building in Bath, Somerset, England. Standing on the northwestern edge of Kingsmead Square, the building was completed in 1763. It is now Grade I listed.

Today, the building is occupied by number 12, 13 and 14 Kingsmead Square and numbers 1 and 2 Kingsmead Street. The house is named after Thomas Rosewell, who commissioned it from architect John Strahan and whose sign, a rose and a well, can be seen on the baroque facade with the date 1736. It is a three-storey building with a mansard roof. The ground floor has been changed to include shop fronts, but a detached Ionic porch can still be seen. Dr Joseph Butler, the Bishop of Durham and a theologian, apologist and philosopher, died at Rosewell House in 1752.

Originally, Rosewell House was situated at the end of a rank of houses, but the neighbouring 11, 12 and 13 Kingsmead Square were demolished to construct New Street on a diagonal alignment out of the square to provide better access to the new Bath Green Park railway station.
