= Nick Jones (entrepreneur) =

English restaurateur and club proprietor (born 1963)

Nicholas Keith Arthur Jones, MBE (born 22 September 1963) is an English restaurateur and club proprietor. He is the owner of the Babington House hotel and health club and founder and former chief executive of Soho House UK Ltd, which specialises in luxury private members' club venues with restaurants, cinemas, health spas and bedrooms, with some aspects open to the public. Jones retains a minority shareholding (10%) in the Soho House group.

== Early life ==
His father was an insurance broker. Jones grew up in Cobham, Surrey, the third of four children. At seven, he was sent to boarding school. By his own admission, he didn't shine at school, and partly puts this down to his dyslexia. By the time he left school at 17 he had decided on a career in catering. "It was considered a sh*t job, 20 years ago. But that was partly the reason why I wanted to go into it. Plus, I'm obsessed with food." He was partly influenced in this decision by the fact that his mother was a follower of the chef Robert Carrier.

== Career ==
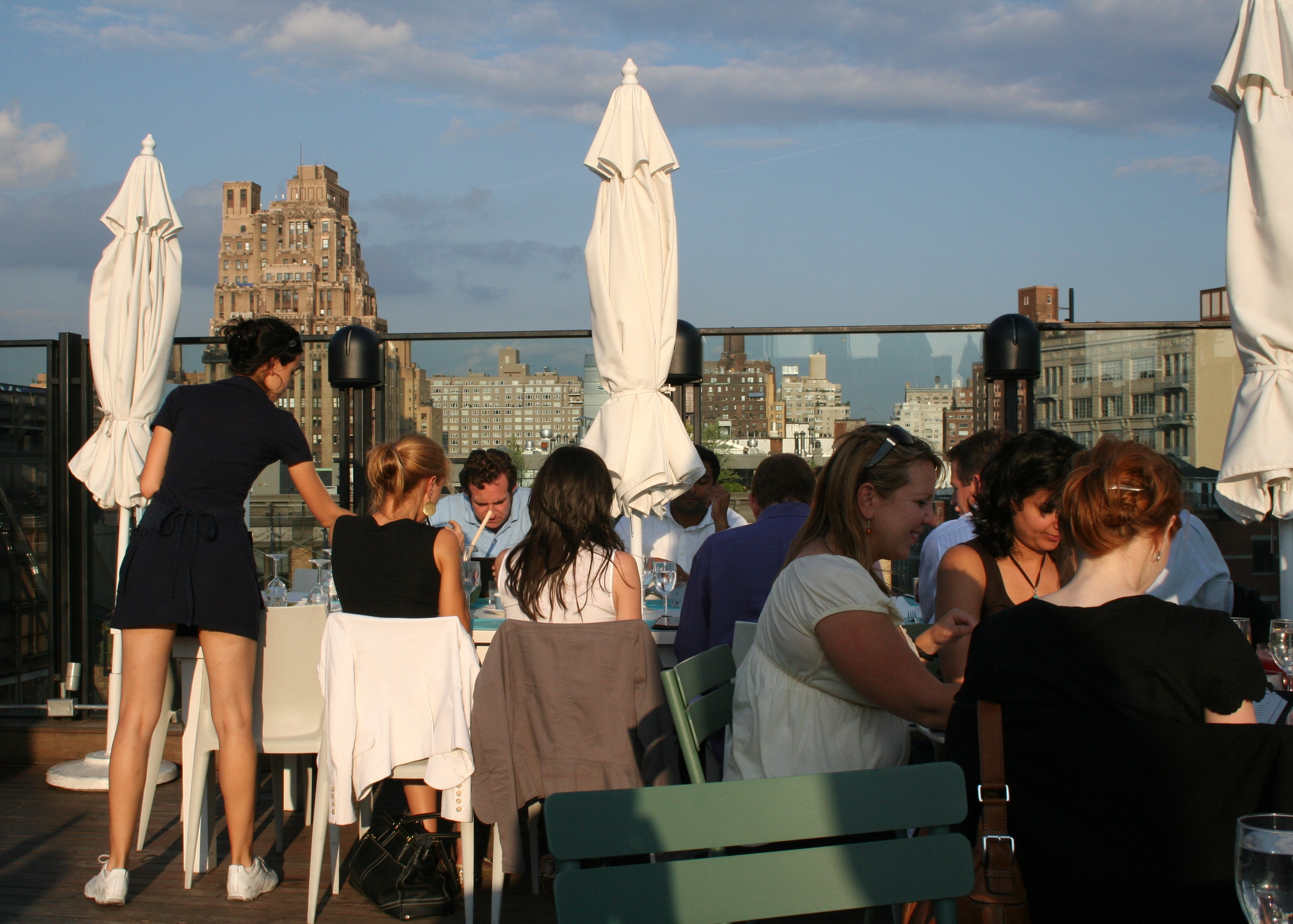
The rooftop bar at Soho House in New York

After leaving school he joined the Trusthouse Forte training scheme in 1980. He spent eight years with the group, rising to marketing manager at Grosvenor House Hotel in Park Lane. In the 1980s, Jones created Over the Top, a small group of restaurants.

He opened the Soho House Club above his Café Boheme restaurant in 1995. His current portfolio includes six London restaurants (Balham Kitchen & Bar, Barcelona, Boheme Kitchen and Bar, Café Boheme, Cecconi's and Electric Brasserie).

The clubs include Soho House (London and New York), Babington House in Somerset, the Electric House and High Road House & Brasserie in London and Soho Farmhouse in Oxfordshire.

The group has also developed the Cowshed spa and salon along with a line of Cowshed-branded hair and body products.

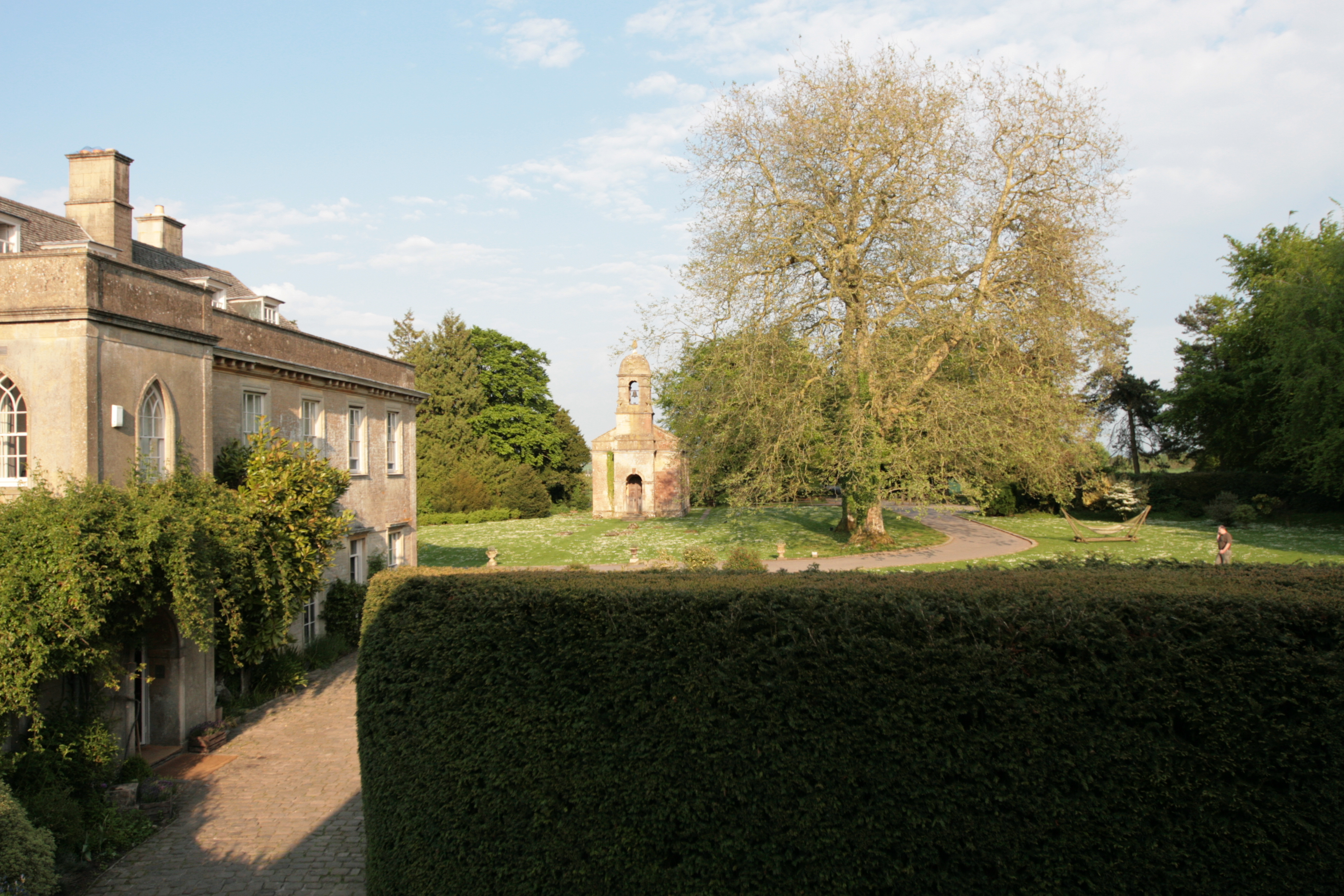
Babington House

In 1998 he acquired Babington House, which offered a private members' club and cinema.

In that year, he was cautioned by police after eleven Polish illegal immigrants were found working at the hotel. The hotel has gained a strong celebrity following, hosting many notable weddings.

In 2003, he opened Soho House New York (with 24 bedrooms, a cinema, bar, restaurant, Cowshed spa and private members' club), along with the Balham Kitchen & Bar and in early 2004 took over the daily operation of Mayfair restaurant Cecconi's which was reopened in late 2005 after a complete makeover.

In 2016, Jones announced the launch of Soho Home, a version of his current venture which allowed guests to additionally purchase the furniture within the property they were staying in. The inspiration behind this new development simply came from requests by guests staying at Soho House venues for the vendors which their furnishings came from. As more and more items were manufactured in house, Jones made the call to sell them as products separately.

Jones was appointed a Member of the Order of the British Empire (MBE) in the 2017 New Year Honours for services to the hospitality industry.

== Personal life ==
He has two children, from his first marriage. He married his second wife, television presenter Kirsty Young at Babington House in September 1999, having met her there in 1998. The couple have two daughters.
