= Joseph Butler =

English Anglican bishop (1692–1752)

The Right Reverend Joseph Butler
- Bishop of Durham
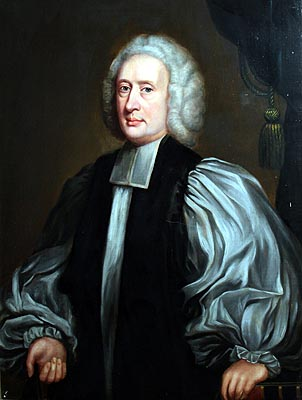
- Portrait of Butler by John Vanderbank
- Diocese: Durham
- In office: 1750–1752
- Predecessor: Edward Chandler
- Successor: Richard Trevor
- Other posts: Bishop of Bristol (1738–1750); Dean of St Paul's (1740–1750)

Orders
- Ordination: 26 October 1718 (deacon); 21 December 1718 (priest) by William Talbot
- Consecration: 3 December 1738

Personal details
- Born: 18 May 1692 Wantage, Berkshire, England
- Died: 16 June 1752 (aged 60) Bath, Somerset, Great Britain
- Buried: 20 June 1752 O.S. Bristol Cathedral.
- Denomination: Presbyterian; Anglican (after 1714)
- Residence: Rosewell House, Kingsmead Square, Bath (at death)
- Parents: Thomas Butler
- Profession: Theologian, apologist, philosopher

Sainthood
- Feast day: 16 June (commemoration)

Education
- Education: Tewkesbury Academy; Oriel College, Oxford

Philosophical work
- Era: 18th-century philosophy
- Region: Western philosophy
- School: Empiricism, Christian philosophy
- Main interests: Theology
- Notable ideas: Criticism of deism Analogies of religion Circularity objection to John Locke's account of personal identity

Joseph Butler (18 May 1692 O.S. – 16 June 1752 O.S.) was an English Anglican bishop, theologian, apologist, and philosopher, born in Wantage in the English county of Berkshire (now in Oxfordshire). His principal works are the Fifteen Sermons Preached at the Rolls Chapel (1726) and The Analogy of Religion (1736).

He is known for critiques of deism, Thomas Hobbes's egoism, and John Locke's theory of personal identity. The many philosophers and religious thinkers Butler influenced included David Hume, Thomas Reid, Adam Smith, Henry Sidgwick, John Henry Newman, and C. D. Broad, and is widely seen as "one of the pre-eminent English moralists." He played a major, if underestimated role in developing 18th-century economic discourse, influencing political economist Josiah Tucker.

== Biography ==
Arms of Joseph Butler, Bishop of Durham: Argent, three covered cups in bend between two bendlets engrailed sable

=== Early life and education ===
Butler was born on 18 May 1692. The son of a Presbyterian linen draper, Butler was destined for the ministry of that church, and with the future archbishop Thomas Secker, entered Samuel Jones's dissenting academy at Gloucester (later Tewkesbury) for the purpose. There he began a secret correspondence with the Anglican theologian and philosopher Samuel Clarke. In 1714, he decided to join the Church of England and entered Oriel College, Oxford, receiving a Bachelor of Arts degree in 1718 and named a Doctor of Civil Law on 8 December 1733.

=== Church career ===
Butler was ordained a deacon on 26 October 1718 by William Talbot, Bishop of Salisbury, in his Bishop's Palace, Salisbury, his palace chapel and a priest on 21 December 1718 by Talbot at St James's Church, Piccadilly. After holding various other high positions, he became rector of the rich living of Stanhope, County Durham.

In 1736 Butler became the head chaplain of George II's wife Caroline, on the advice of Lancelot Blackburne. He was nominated Bishop of Bristol on 19 October 1738 and consecrated a bishop on 3 December 1738 at Lambeth Palace chapel. Remaining Bishop of Bristol, Butler was installed Dean of St Paul's on 24 May 1740, keeping the office until his translation to Durham. He is said apocryphally to have declined an offer to become Archbishop of Canterbury in 1747, but he served as Clerk of the Closet to the king in 1746–1752. He was translated to Durham by the confirmation of his election in October 1750; he was then enthroned by proxy on 9 November 1750. He is buried in Bristol Cathedral.

=== Death and legacy ===
Butler died in 1752 at Rosewell House, Kingsmead Square in Bath, Somerset. His admirers have praised him as an excellent person and a diligent and conscientious churchman. Though indifferent to literature, he had some taste in the fine arts, especially architecture.

In the Church of England, Butler is remembered with a commemoration on 16 June. He had his own collection of manuscripts (e. g. Lectionary 189).

== Philosophy ==
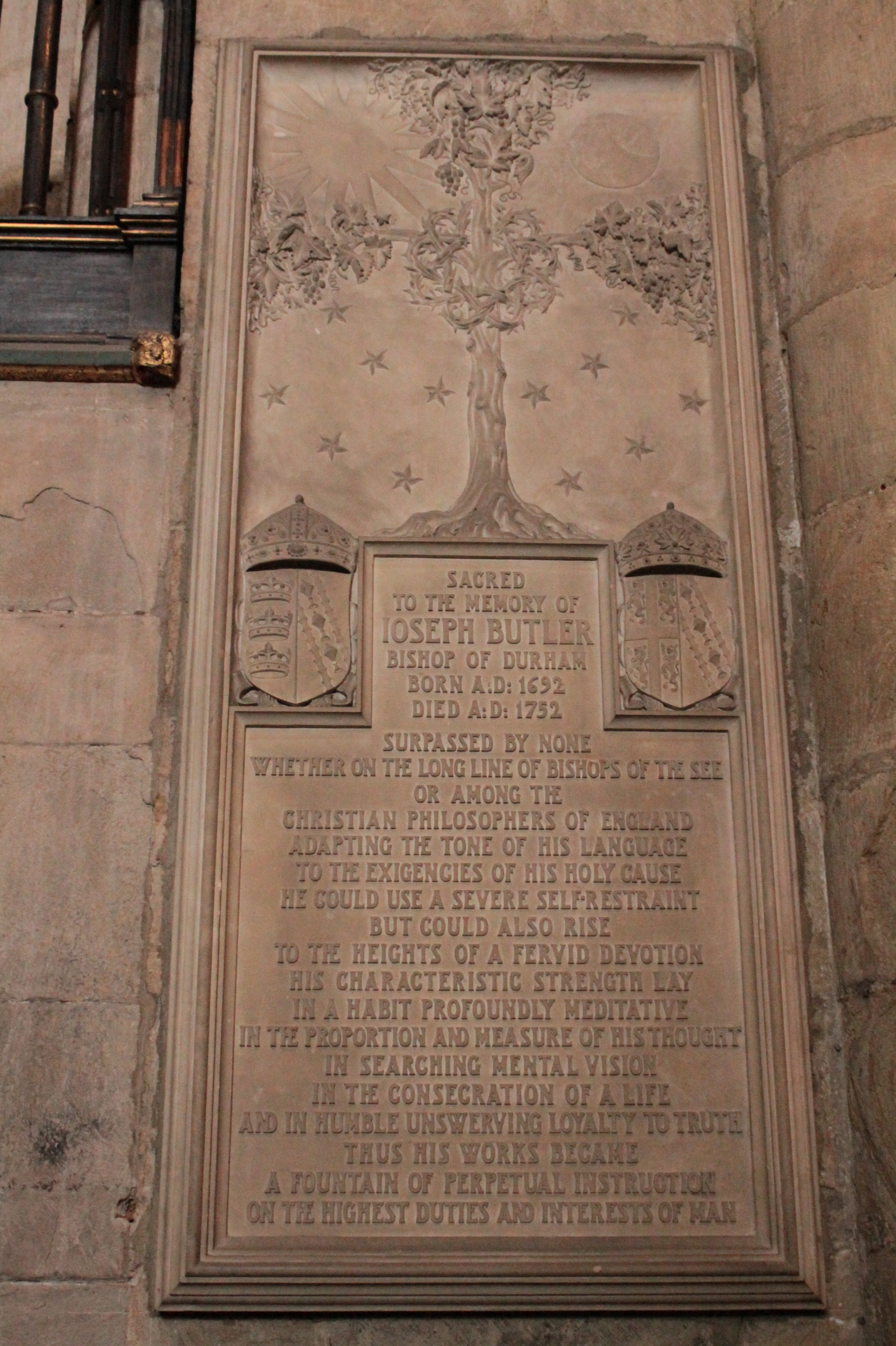
Memorial to Bishop Joseph Butler, Durham Cathedral

=== Attack on deism ===
During his lifetime and for many years after, Butler was best known for his Analogy of Religion, Natural and Revealed (1736), which according to historian Will Durant "remained for a century the chief buttress of Christian argument against unbelief." English deists such as John Toland and Matthew Tindal had argued that nature provides clear evidence of an intelligent designer and artificer, but they rejected orthodox Christianity due to the incredibility of miracles and the cruelties and contradictions recorded in the Bible.

Butler's Analogy was one of many book-length replies to the deists, and long believed to be the most effective. Butler argued that nature itself was full of mysteries and cruelties and so shared the same alleged defects as the Bible. Arguing on empiricist grounds that all knowledge of nature and human conduct is merely probable, Butler appealed to a series of patterns ("analogies") observable in nature and human affairs, which in his view make the chief teachings of Christianity likely.

Butler argued that "because nature is a mess of riddles, we cannot expect revelation to be any clearer". Today, Butler's Analogy is "now largely of historical interest," with the only part widely read being the section which deals with his criticism of John Locke's theory of personal identity.

=== Ethics and moral psychology ===
A Butler scholar, Stephen Darwall, wrote: "Probably no figure had a greater impact on nineteenth-century British moral philosophy than Butler." Butler's chief target in the Sermons was Thomas Hobbes and the egoistic view of human nature he had defended in Leviathan (1651). Hobbes was a materialist who believed that science reveals a world in which all events are causally determined and in which all human choices flow unavoidably from whatever desire is most powerful in a person at a given time. Hobbes saw human beings as being violent, self-seeking, and power-hungry. Such a view left no place for genuine altruism, benevolence or concept of morality as traditionally conceived.

In the Sermons, Butler argues that human motivation is less selfish and more complex than Hobbes claimed. He maintains that the human mind is an organised hierarchy of a number of different impulses and principles, many of which are not fundamentally selfish. The ground floor, so to speak, holds a wide variety of specific emotions, appetites and affections, such as hunger, anger, fear and sympathy. They, in properly organised minds, are controlled by two superior principles: self-love (a desire to maximise one's own long-term happiness) and benevolence (a desire to promote general happiness). The more general impulses are in turn subject to the highest practical authority in the human mind: moral conscience. Conscience, Butler claims, is an inborn sense of right and wrong, an inner light and monitor, received from God. Conscience tells one to promote the general happiness and personal happiness. Experience informs that the two aims largely coincide in the present life. For many reasons, Butler argues, unethical and self-centred people who care nothing for the public good are not usually very happy.

There are, however, rare cases where the wicked seem for a time to prosper. A perfect harmony of virtue and self-interest, Butler claimed, is guaranteed only by a just God, who in the afterlife rewards and punishes people as they deserve.

=== Criticism of Locke ===
In Appendix 1 of the Analogy, Butler offers a famous criticism of John Locke's influential theory of "personal identity", an explanation of what makes someone the "same person" from one time to the next, despite all the physical and psychological changes experienced over that period. Locke claimed that personal identity is not from having the same body or the same soul but from having the same consciousness and memory. According to Locke, memory is the "glue" that ties the various stages of our life together and constitutes sameness of person. This section of the Analogy is the only widely read part of it today.

More precisely, Locke claims, Person A is the same person as Person B only in a case where A and B share at least some of the same memories. Butler said that the way "real" memories can be distinguished from false ones is that people who actually had the experiences are the ones who remember. Thus, Butler claimed, memory presupposes personal identity and so cannot constitute it.

== Veneration ==
Butler is honoured on the liturgical calendar of the Episcopal Church (USA) on 16 June.

== Styles and titles ==
- 1692–1718: Joseph Butler Esq.
- 1718–1733: The Reverend Joseph Butler
- 1733–1738: The Reverend Doctor Joseph Butler
- 1738–1752: The Right Reverend Doctor Joseph Butler

== Publications ==
- Several letters to the Reverend Dr. Clarke, 1716, 1719, 1725 – reprinted in Volume 1 of Gladstone's edition of Butler's works
- Fifteen Sermons Preached at the Rolls Chapel, 1726, 1729, 1736, 1749, 1759, 1765, 1769, 1774, 1792
- The Analogy of Religion, Natural and Revealed, to the Constitution and Course of Nature, 1736, 1740, 1750, 1754, 1764, 1765, 1771, 1775, 1785, 1788, 1791, 1793, 1796, 1798
- A sermon preached before the Incorporated Society for the Propagation of the Gospel in Foreign Parts, 1739
- A sermon preached before the Right Honourable the Lord-Mayor, 1740
- A sermon preached before the House of Lords, 1741, 1747
- A sermon preached in the parish-church of Christ-Church, London, 1745
- A sermon, preached before His Grace Charles Duke of Richmond, Lenox, and Aubigny, president, 1748, 1751
- Six sermons preached upon publick occasions, 1749
- A catalogue of the libraries [...], 1753
- A charge delivered to the clergy at the primary visitation of the diocese of Durham, 1751, 1786 – reprinted in Volume 2 of Gladstone's edition of Butler's works

== See also ==
- Altruism
- Christian philosophy
- Deism

== Notes ==
Church of England titles
| Preceded by Thomas Gooch | Bishop of Bristol; 1738–1750 | Succeeded by John Conybeare |
| Preceded by Francis Hare, Bishop of Chichester | Dean of St Paul's; 1740–1750 | Succeeded by Thomas Secker, Bishop of Oxford |
| Preceded by Edward Chandler | Bishop of Durham; 1750–1752 | Succeeded by Richard Trevor |
