= Fifteen Sermons Preached at the Rolls Chapel =

- 1765 edition of the Sermons
- Author: Joseph Butler

Fifteen Sermons Preached at the Rolls Chapel is a collection of sermons by English Bishop Joseph Butler first published in 1726. The earlier sermons try to reconcile ethical egoism and benevolence, laying out a view of moral psychology which is explored in the later sermons within particular cases (e.g., self-deception, forgiveness, resentment).

Butler was appointed to the job of preacher at the Rolls Chapel in London's legal district in 1719. The job was Butler's first, and a prestigious one at that. He held it for six or seven years. When the first edition of these sermons appeared he had already left London for Stanhope. His other sermons preached here were lost; the Rolls Chapel no longer survives and in his will, Butler specified that any papers found "be burnt without being read by anyone". The Fifteen Sermons were later published together with Six Sermons on Public Occasions, preached by Butler between 1738 and 1749 on subjects relating to civil society (for example, charity and the mission of the church).

The moral psychology presented in the Sermons proved influential. David Hume and Adam Smith took note of it in developing their own theories of the moral sentiments. The publication of Butler's major treatise, The Analogy of Religion, ten years after the Sermons tended to push the Sermons into obscurity. This trend began to be reversed by the end of the 18th century. Samuel Taylor Coleridge held the Sermons in high regard and William Hazlitt wrote of Butler:

The Analogy is a tissue of sophistry, of wire-drawn, theological special-pleading; the Sermons (with the Preface to them) are in a fine vein of deep, matured reflection, a candid appeal to our observation of human nature, without pedantry and without bias.

Philosopher Aaron Garrett described the Sermons's later influence as follows:

In the late nineteenth and early twentieth century Butler’s Sermons became more influential than the Analogy, due to their influence at Oxford and Cambridge and particularly on William Whewell and Sidgwick. Throughout the later nineteenth century and the twentieth century they were discussed by and had great impact on many of the central moral philosophers of the Anglo-American tradition — G. E. Moore, H. A. Pritchard, and particularly W. D. Ross, among many.

The genre of published sermons was a commonplace one in Butler's time but, as editor of Butler's work David E. White notes, "of all the English sermons published at any time, Butler's are the only ones routinely studied in secular classes in moral philosophy." Garrett notes how surprising it is that such a "high degree of analytic rigor and argumentative care" should be present "in sermons (and particularly in footnotes to sermons)."
