= Kingsmead Square =

Square in Bath, England

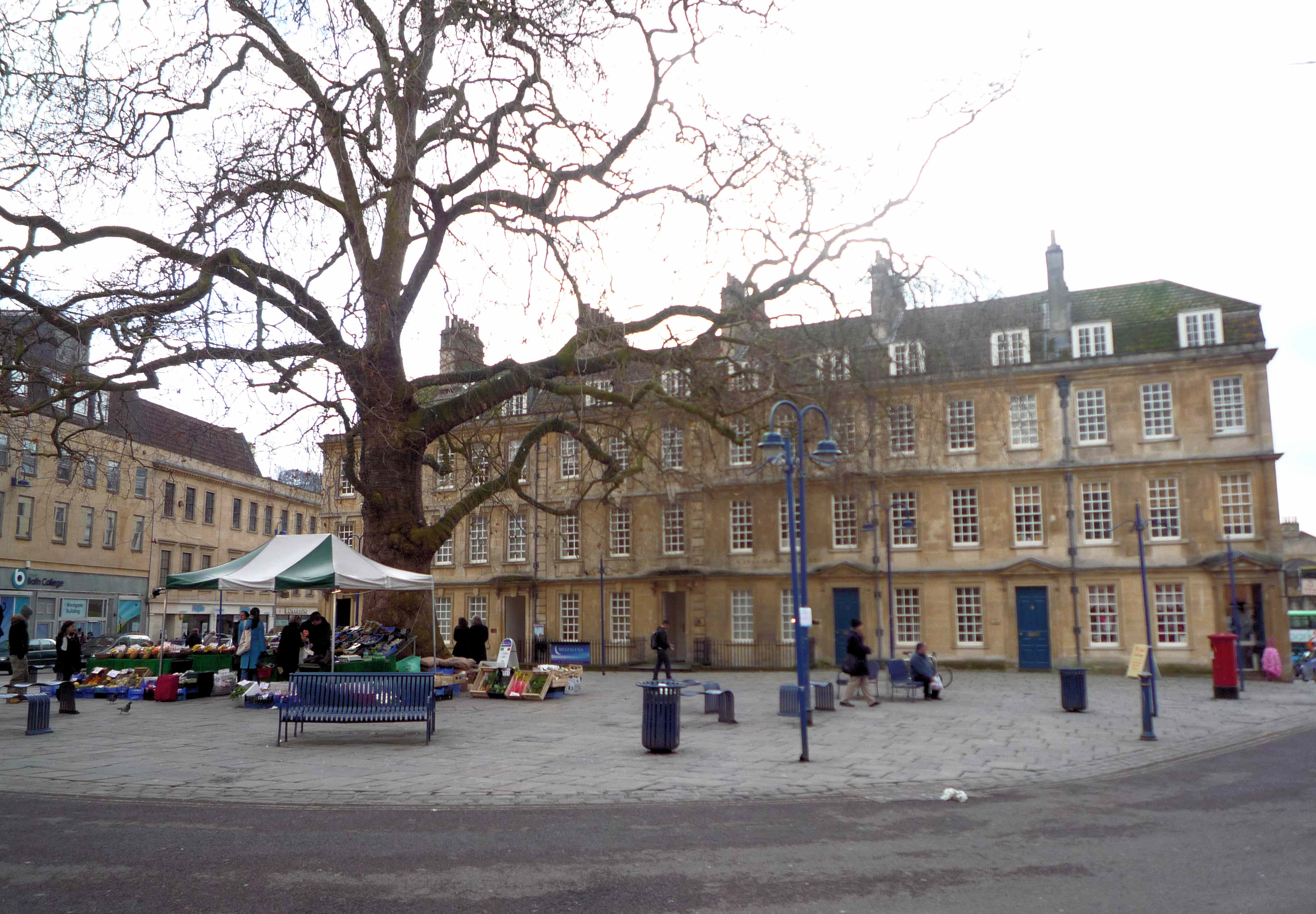
- Looking south in 2010

- Location within Somerset
- 51.38124°N 2.36315°W
- Location: Bath, Somerset, England

History
- Built: 1730s

Site notes
- Architect: John Strahan

Listed Building – Grade I
- Official name: Rosewell House (number 12 to 14)
- Designated: 12 June 1950
- Reference no.: 1394043

Listed Building – Grade II
- Official name: Number 5 to 10
- Designated: 12 June 1950
- Reference no.: 1394040

Listed Building – Grade II
- Official name: Number 18
- Designated: 5 August 1975
- Reference no.: 1394051

Listed Building – Grade II
- Official name: Number 16
- Designated: 5 August 1975
- Reference no.: 1394047

Listed Building – Grade II
- Official name: Number 15
- Designated: 5 August 1975
- Reference no.: 1394046

Listed Building – Grade II
- Official name: 2, Monmouth Street; 17, Kingsmead Square
- Designated: 5 August 1975
- Reference no.: 1394049

Kingsmead Square is a public square in Bath, Somerset, England. It was laid out by John Strahan in the 1730s; many of the buildings are now listed structures.

== History ==
The square was originally the junction of a number of routes entering the West Gate of the medieval city. In 1727, John Strahan started a large-scale Georgian expansion in this area of pasture owned by St John's Hospital. The West Gate was demolished in the 1760s, enlarging the road junction. In 1902, the square became part of a Bath Tramways route. In 1925, a street-widening scheme to tackle traffic congestion established the modern street lines of the square.

During and after World War II, the square became run down. In the mid-1970s, the south terrace was restored, saving it from demolition and starting a revival of the area. In the 1990s, investment in street furniture and on the square, further revived it, making the square an attractive location for cafés.

In September 2018, Bath and North East Somerset Council initiated an informal consultation on a proposal to partially pedestrianise the square.

== Buildings ==
Rosewell House comprises 12, 13 and 14 Kingsmead Square and 1 and 2 Kingsmead Street. Originally, Rosewell House was situated at the end of a rank of houses, but the neighbouring 11, 12 and 13 Kingsmead Square were demolished to construct New Street on a diagonal alignment out of the square to provide better access to the new Bath Green Park railway station.

At the centre of the square is a large London plane tree, about 20 metres (66 ft) tall. The square has full public access, with a ground surface of concrete slabs and cobbles.

== See also ==
- List of Grade I listed buildings in Bath and North East Somerset
- Kingsmead, Bath
