= Lectionary 192 =

Lectionary ℓ 192
- New Testament manuscript
- Text: Evangelistarion †
- Date: 13th century
- Script: Greek
- Now at: British Library
- Size: 27.5 cm by 21.5 cm
- Hand: coarse writing

Lectionary 192, designated by siglum ℓ 192 (in the Gregory-Aland numbering) is a Greek manuscript of the New Testament, on parchment leaves. Palaeographically it has been assigned to the 13th century. Scrivener labelled it by 264^{evl}.

== Description ==
The codex contains Lessons from the Gospels of John, Matthew, Luke lectionary (Evangelistarium), on 104 parchment leaves (27.5 cm by 21.5 cm), with lacunae at the beginning and end. It is written in Greek minuscule letters, in two columns per page, 30-32 lines per page, in very unusual black ink.

There are daily lessons from Easter to Pentecost.

== History ==
Usually it is dated to the 13th century. Boone bought the manuscript for the British Museum in 1853.

The manuscript was examined by Bloomfield. It was added to the list of New Testament manuscripts by Scrivener (number 264). Gregory saw it in 1882.

The manuscript is not cited in the critical editions of the Greek New Testament (UBS3).

Currently the codex is located in the British Library (Add MS 19460) in London.

== See also ==
- List of New Testament lectionaries
- Biblical manuscript
- Textual criticism

== Bibliography ==
- Gregory, Caspar René (1900). Textkritik des Neuen Testaments, Vol. 1. Leipzig. p. 403.
