= John Cossins =

British cartographer

John Cossins (1697–1743) was an early cartographer, known for the following city maps:

- plan of Leeds (c.1730) titled "A New and Exact Plan of the Town of Leedes"
- map of York (1726): "New and Exact Plan of the City of York" This displayed fashionable new houses around the margin of the map.

== Family ==
Cossins was the elder of the two sons and three daughters of William Cossins of Brompton, who (1707–1725) was steward of the Hackness estate, then consisting of the townships of Hackness, Suffield, Everley, Silpho, Broxa, Langdale End, much of Harwood Dale and some of Burniston. It was as map-maker of this lordship that John first learned the practice and skills of land surveying and drawing.

== Notebooks ==
In 1993 Sothebys offered Cossins' notebook for sale. It was bought by York City Archives. It contained notes on his maps of Scarborough, York and Leeds and also a list of the subscribers. Originally 138 people subscribed to 192 copies of the Leeds plan; only one copy is now accessible, in Leeds City Museum. It has been suggested that Thoresby was instrumental in hiring Cossins, and a copy of the map is kept at the Thoresby Society.
