= Redland Chapel =

Church in Bristol, England

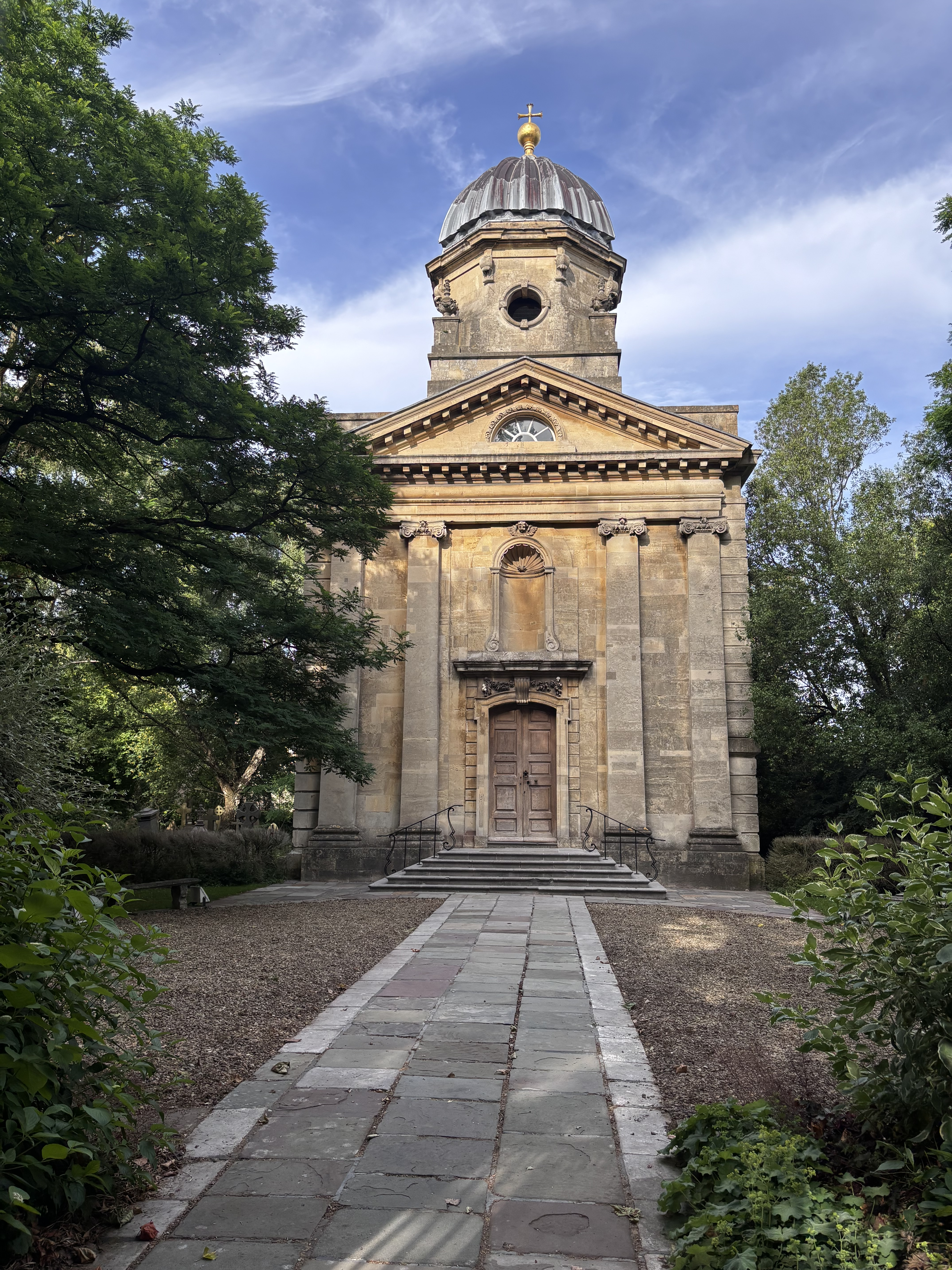
- Redland Chapel

- Location within Bristol

General information
- Location: Bristol, England
- Coordinates: 51.472208°N 2.606378°W
- Completed: 1742

Design and construction
- Architect: John Strahan

Redland Parish Church is a Georgian church, built in 1742, in the Redland suburb of Bristol, England. It is a Grade I listed building.

== History ==
It which was built, probably by John Strahan and completed by William Halfpenny, with plasterwork by Thomas Paty, in 1742 as a private chapel for John Cossins who had purchased the local manor house, Redland Court, which served as Redland High School until 2017, though it was not consecrated until 1790.

The chapel eventually became the parish church when the parish of Redland was separated from Westbury-on-Trym in 1942 and, unusually, has no dedication to a patron saint.

== Architecture ==
The front of the limestone building has four Ionic pilasters around the door with a pediment above. The roof of the building has an octagonal leaded cupola. On the rear of the buildings are carved moors heads.

Inside are a square chancel and a nave. The interior has a coffered ceiling and intricately carved wooden panels showing birds and foliage. The Baroque carvings are made of limewood and mounted on dark oak background. The original pulpit was of three levels however this was reduced to two in the Victorian era. Memorial busts of John Cossins and his wife were carved by John Michael Rysbrack.

The walls and gates were constructed in 1743. The gate piers have ziggurat tops and gates made by Nathaniel Arthur.

== Archives ==
Parish records for Redland Green church, Bristol are held at Bristol Archives (Ref. P.RG) (online catalogue) including baptism, marriage and burial registers. The archive also includes records of the incumbent, churchwardens and parochial church council plus photographs.

== See also ==
- Grade I listed buildings in Bristol
- Churches in Bristol
