= Soho House (club) =

UK chain of hotels and clubs

Soho House & Co Inc.

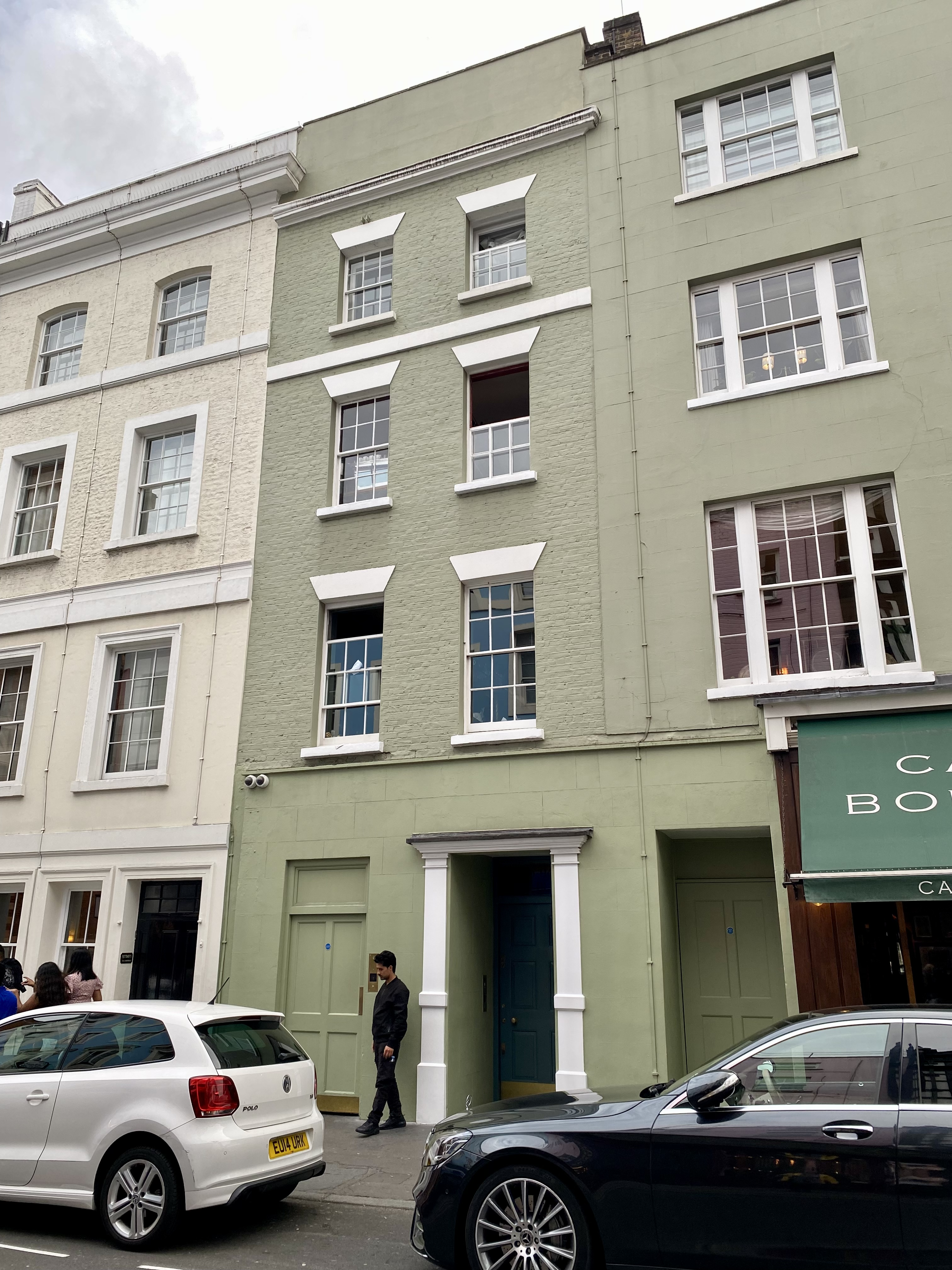
- The original Soho House at 40 Greek Street, Soho, London
- Company type: Private
- Traded as: NYSE: SHCO
- Founded: 1995; 31 years ago
- Founder: Nick Jones
- Headquarters: 72–74 Dean Street, Soho London, England
- Number of locations: 46 Houses (2025); 75 total sites (2022)
- Key people: Ron Burkle, Executive chairman; Andrew Carnie, President & CEO
- Revenue: ▲US$1.14 billion (2023 – last data, privatized in 2025)
- Operating income: ▲US$−20 million (2023 – last data, privatized in 2025)
- Net income: ▲US$−118 million (2023 – last data, privatized in 2025)
- Total assets: ▲US$2.54 billion (2023 – last data, privatized in 2025)
- Total equity: ▼US$−158 million (2023 – last data, privatized in 2025)
- Members: 270,000 (2025)
- Number of employees: 7,852 (2024)
- Website: sohohouse.com

Soho House is an international private members’ club with a focus on the media, arts and fashion industries.

The company operates clubs, hotels, restaurants and other venues. In 2015, it changed its name from SOHO House Group to Soho House & Co. The original location is at 40 Greek Street, Soho, London, England. As of March 2024, Soho House operated 42 club locations worldwide, with plans to open more.

== History and ownership ==
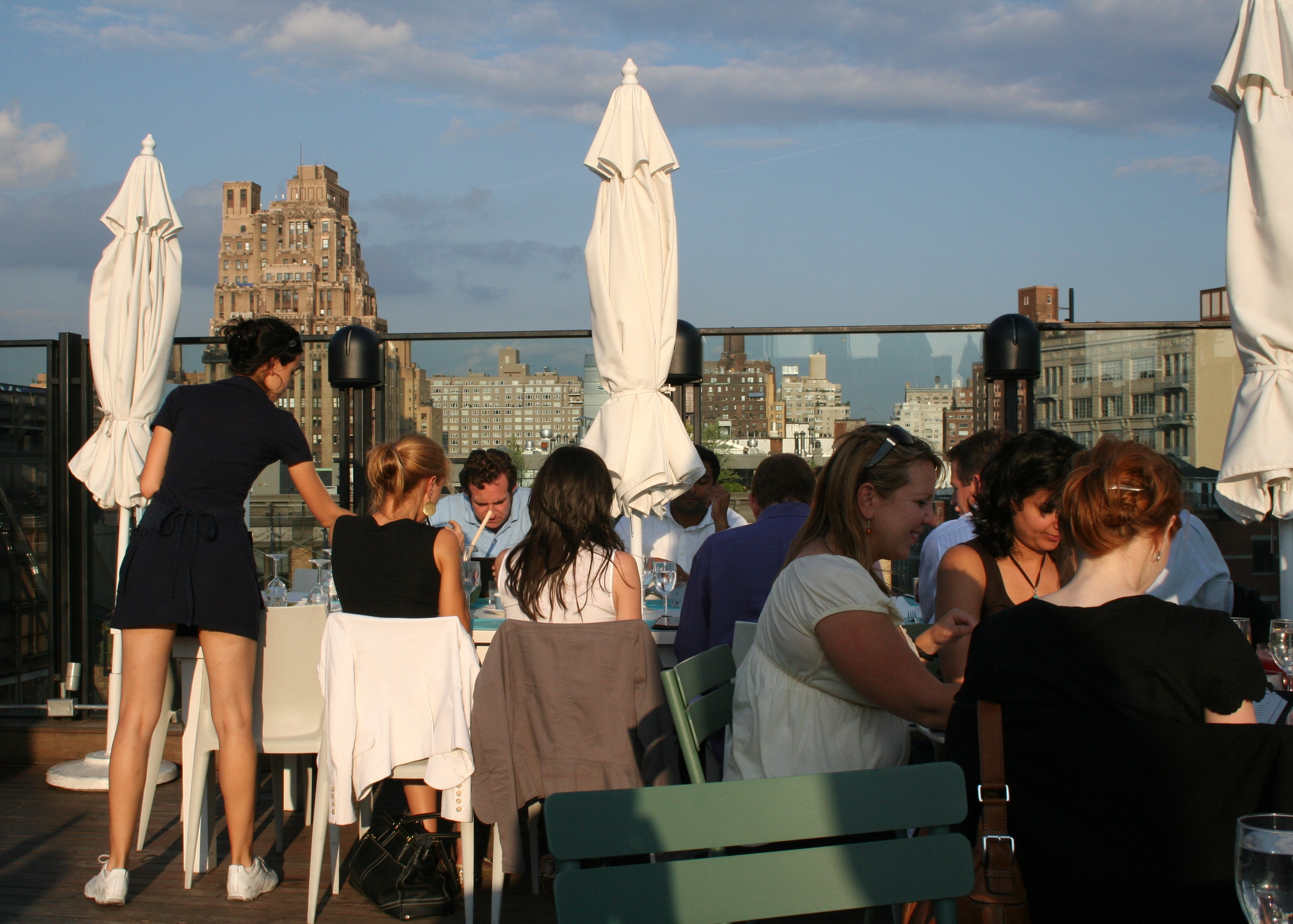
The rooftop bar of Soho House in New York City

Soho House was started by restaurateur Nick Jones in 1995 on London's Greek Street above his restaurant, Café Bohème. In 2008, Jones sold 80% of the club for UK£105 million (equivalent to £156 million in 2024) to British businessman Richard Caring's Caprice Holdings.

On 13 January 2012, the Financial Times announced that 60% of Soho House Group had been acquired by the US billionaire Ron Burkle, through his investment fund Yucaipa for £250 million (equivalent to £347 million in 2024), with Jones retaining 10% and Caring 30%. In September 2015, the company’s high leverage and limited free cash flow was under scrutiny by fixed income investors. However, company profit potential was affected by growth in new clubs.

In 2019, Soho House acquired Scorpios, a beach club compound on a 650 m^{2} (7,000 sq ft) peninsula in southern Mykonos.

The company filed for an initial public offering on the New York Stock Exchange in 2021, and went public in July 2021, trading under the name Membership Collective Group. From then on, Jones owned just under 6% of the shares, alongside Caring (20%) and Burkle (42.5%). The IPO raised US$470 million (equivalent to $535 million in 2024), allowing the company to reduce some of its debt burden and finance further expansion.

In November 2022, Jones stepped down from day-to-day running of the business, citing a recent cancer diagnosis and recovery, and appointed Andrew Carnie as CEO. On March 20, 2023 Membership Collective Group became Soho House & Company. Their stock symbol changed from MCG to SHCO.

As of 2024, Soho House had never made a profit; pre-tax losses for 2024 were forecast to be about $73 million. Within less than three years after listing, the company started exploring the idea of going private as it struggled to turn a profit despite growth in membership and revenue. In August 2025, it publicly announced plans to go private in a $2.7 billion deal led by New York-based MCR Hotels.

== Membership ==
Soho House membership policies are said to focus on creativity "above net worth and job titles" with "studied resistance to ostentation...[and] cultivated status signifiers," and favour moral values over financial success ("several execs were banned because they were thought to be abusive to their assistants").

In June 2015, Soho House had over 50,000 members and a global waiting list of over 30,000. In July 2021, Soho House had 119,000 members across 27 houses in 10 countries.

== Locations ==
List of current and planned Houses is maintained on Soho House's website.

Europe/Middle East
United Kingdom
- London
  - 180 House
  - White City House
  - Soho House Hampstead Health (Opening 2027)
  - 40 Greek Street
  - Shoreditch House
  - 76 Dean Street
  - High Road House
  - Electric House
  - Little House Mayfair
  - Little House Balham
  - Soho Mews House
- East Sussex
  - Brighton Beach House
- Somerset
  - Babington House (since 1998)
- Oxfordshire
  - Soho Farmhouse (since 2015)
- Windsor
  - River House
- Manchester
  - Soho House Manchester (opening in 2025)
Netherlands
- Amsterdam
  - Soho House Amsterdam (since 2018)
Greece
- Mykonos
  - Soho Roc House (since 2020)
Spain
- Barcelona
  - Soho House Barcelona
  - Little Beach House Barcelona
- Ibiza
  - Soho Farmhouse Ibiza
Turkey
- Istanbul
  - Soho House Istanbul
Italy
- Rome
  - Soho House Rome (since 2021)

Sweden
- Stockholm
  - Soho House Stockholm
Israel
- Tel Aviv
  - Soho House Tel Aviv Jaffa
France
- Paris
  - Soho House Paris
Denmark
- Copenhagen
  - Soho House Copenhagen
Germany
- Berlin
  - Soho House Berlin

North America

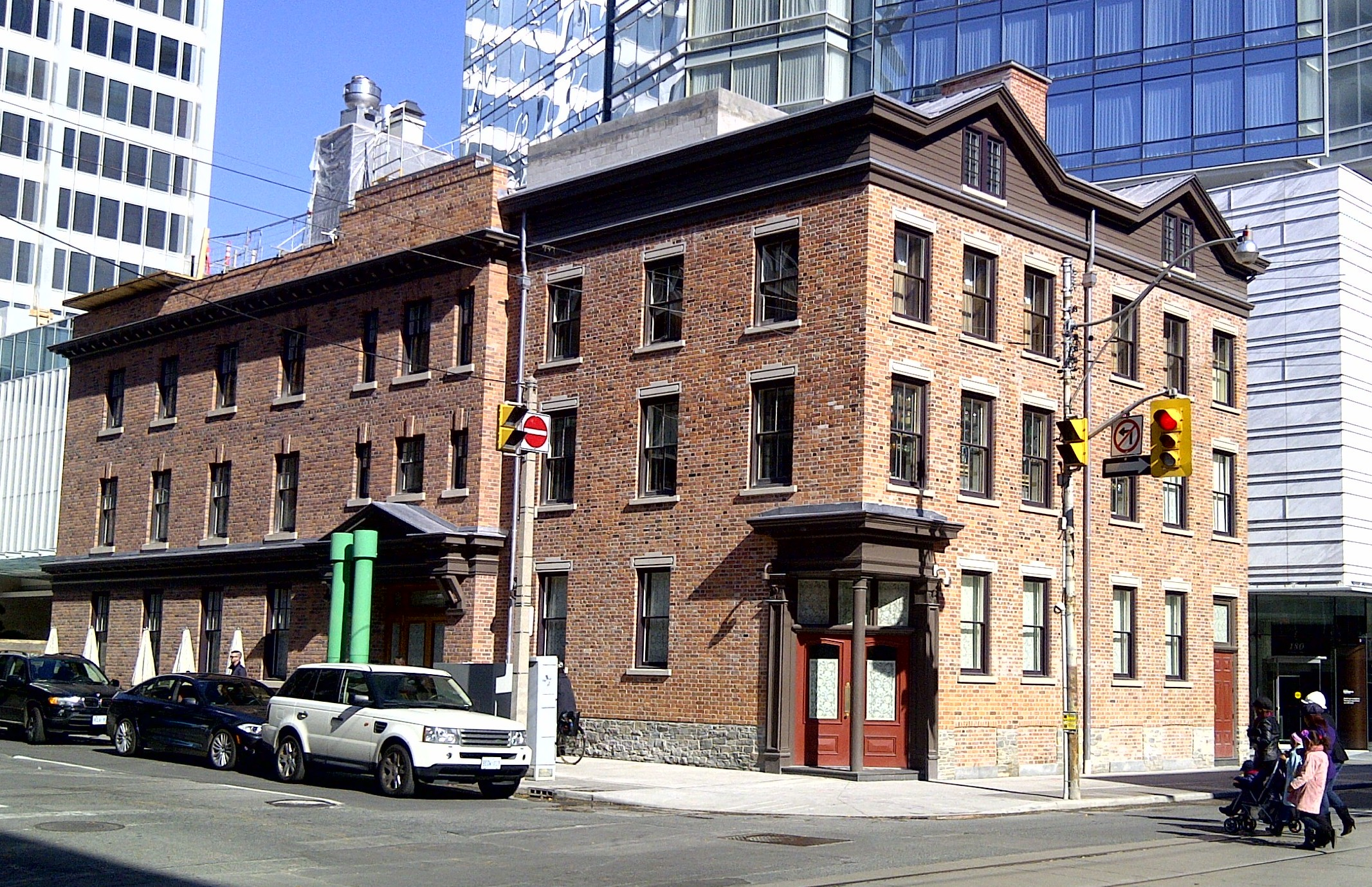
Soho House in Toronto

Canada
- Toronto
  - Soho House Toronto
Mexico
- Mexico City
  - Soho House Mexico City
United States
- New York
  - Soho House New York
  - DUMBO House
  - Ludlow House
- Los Angeles
  - Little Beach House Malibu
  - Soho Warehouse
  - Holloway House
  - Soho House West Hollywood (since 2010)
- Chicago
  - Soho House Chicago (since 2014)
- Miami
  - Soho Beach House
  - Miami Pool House
- Nashville
  - Soho House Nashville
- Austin
  - Soho House Austin
- Portland, Oregon
  - Soho House Portland

Caribbean
Saint Vincent and the Grenadines
- Canouan
  - Soho Beach House Canouan

South America
Brazil
- São Paulo
  - Soho House São Paulo

Asia
Hong Kong
- Hong Kong
  - Soho House Hong Kong
India
- Mumbai
  - Soho House Mumbai
Thailand
- Bangkok
  - Soho House Bangkok

== Activities ==
On 13 August 2017, the film Tulip Fever (starring Alicia Vikander) was first screened at London's Soho House.

== Incidents and controversies ==
In 2002, the London branch of the club made headlines as Iris Law, the two-year-old toddler of Jude Law and Sadie Frost, was briefly hospitalised but ultimately unharmed after swallowing part of an ecstasy tablet she had found on the floor of Soho House while attending a children's birthday party.

In 2009, more than eighty residents signed an appeal by a neighbourhood association against allowing Soho House to move into the top two floors of Luckman Plaza in West Hollywood, near Los Angeles, US. The opening of the West Hollywood location also drew opposition from Beverly Hills Mayor Nancy Krasne.

On 9 December 2010, American swimsuit designer Sylvie Cachay was found murdered in room 20 of the Manhattan branch. Nicholas Brooks, her boyfriend of six months, was convicted of her second-degree murder and sentenced to 25 years to life imprisonment.

In Amsterdam, the Netherlands, an attempt to open a new club also met protest, but an Amsterdam House nonetheless opened in August 2018.

In April 2021, Bottega Veneta was criticised for holding maskless indoor dance parties at Berlin's Soho House for artists and celebrities flown in from around the world during a citywide lockdown imposed due to the COVID-19 pandemic. Though Soho House staff complained about the lack of safety measures and regulatory guidelines, management said nothing and implied that staff were not telling the truth. While the company claimed that what happened was "spontaneous," Berlin's Soho House staff said that the party spaces had been booked in advance. Club members made their dissatisfaction and disappointment known, with some considering ending their membership; police investigated.

== In popular culture ==
Soho House London is mentioned briefly in The Holiday by Jasper (Rufus Sewell). Soho House New York was featured in season 6 of the TV series Sex and the City in an episode titled "Boy Interrupted". In this episode, Samantha Jones (Kim Cattrall) pretends to be a member by using a stolen membership card.

In 2022, Soho House was mentioned in the Netflix drama Inventing Anna, where con artist Anna Delvey, when asked if she was rejected by Soho House in episode two, replied, "I’d rather hang out at a McDonald's or start my own club and reject their members."

Soho House on 76 Dean Street was used as a location in the 2024 crime novel Crooked Was His Cane, the nineteenth DCI Declan Walsh novel written by Tony Lee using the pen name Jack Gatland. In it, character Anjli Kapoor meets with entrepreneur Eden Storm, who comments during the meeting, "Soho House has a rule that only three guests can come in at any time with a member. I told them if they didn't give me four, I would have to buy the building and evict them." Tony Lee has been an "Everyhouse" member of Soho House since 2014.

== Soho Home ==
In 2016, the club launched a 'modern interiors brand designed for relaxed, sociable living', called Soho Home. The brand's flagship store located in Duke of York Square in Chelsea opened in 2021.

In April 2025, Soho House accused Next of copyright and design right infringements over selling furniture that “closely resembled” that of Soho Home.
