= Thomas Branch =

Thomas Branch (fl. 1738–1753), was a British author. His Principia Legis et Æquitatis was regarded as "the accumulated spirit and wisdom of ... the English law."

== Life ==
Nothing is known of Branch's life, but if the "lady of Thomas Branch, Esq." in the obituary of the Gentleman's Magazine for December 1769 was his wife, it may be presumed that he was still alive at that time.

== Works ==
Branch was the author of Thoughts on Dreaming (1738), and Principia Legis et Æquitatis (1753).

Thoughts on Dreaming was a response to Andrew Baxter (metaphysician)'s Enquiry into the Nature of the Human Soul (1733), in which Branch refuted Baxter's argument that dreams are the work of supernatural agents.

Principia Legis et Æquitatis was a collection of maxims, definitions, and remarkable sayings about law and equity, mostly in Latin, presented in alphabetical order. Several editions were published, including an enlarged fifth edition of 1822, which gave translations of the Latin, and an American edition of 1824. It was highly thought of as a student's textbook. James Kent in his Commentaries on American Law (1832), described it as "an admirable vade mecum, for the use of the bench and the bar", adding that "It draws so copiously from the common law reports and writers of the age of Elizabeth, and since that time, that it may be regarded as the accumulated spirit and wisdom of the great body of the English law."
