= John Shute (architect) =

English artist and architect

John Shute (died 1563) was an English artist and architect who was born in Cullompton, Devon. His book, The First and Chief Grounds of Architecture, was the first work in English on classical architecture. Shute's patron was John Dudley, 1st Duke of Northumberland, for whom he built a residential wing at Dudley Castle. He was also known as a painter of miniatures.

== See also ==
- Kenilworth Castle
