= John Strahan =

18th-century English architect

John Strahan was an architect working in Bristol and Bath, England, in the early 18th century. He died around 1740.

== List of works ==
- Shakespeare Public House, Bristol, 1725
- Combe Hay Manor Combe Hay 1728 to 1730
- Frampton Court, Frampton-on-Severn
- Avon Street, Bath
- New King Street, Bath
- Beaufort Square, Bath
- Kingsmead Square, Bath
- Rosewell House, Kingsmead Square, 1736
- Painswick House, 1737
- Redland Chapel Bristol, 1742
