= 1789 in poetry =

Nationality words link to articles with information on the nation's poetry or literature (for instance, Irish or France).

== Events ==
- Robert Burns is appointed an exciseman in Scotland.
- Tomás António Gonzaga is arrested for complicity in the Inconfidência Mineira in Brazil.

== Works published ==
=== Ireland ===
- Charlotte Brooke, Reliques of Irish Poetry, anthology published in the United Kingdom
- John Williams, publishing under the pen name "Anthony Pasquin", Poems: by Anthon Pasquin, Irish poet and satirist published in the United Kingdom

=== United Kingdom ===
- Dafydd ap Gwilym (died 1350/70), Barddoniaeth Dafydd ab Gwilym, Welsh, collected by Iolo Morganwg, incorporating probable forgeries by Morganwg
- William Blake:
  - The Book of Thel, with eight relief-etched plates
  - Songs of Innocence, the author's first illuminated book, with 31 relief-etched plates (see also Songs of Innocence and of Experience: Shewing the Two Contrary States of the Human Soul 1794); Songs of Innocence contains the following (some, as noted below, were later "paired" with a poem having the same title in Songs of Experience):
    - Introduction
    - "The Shepherd"
    - "The Ecchoing Green"
    - "The Little Black Boy"
    - "The Blossom"
    - "Laughing Song"
    - "A Cradle Song"
    - "Night"
    - "Spring"
    - "A Dream"
    - "On Another's Sorrow"
    - "Nurse's Song" (paired)
    - "Infant Joy" (paired)
    - "The Lamb" (paired)
    - "Holy Thursday" (paired)
    - "Holy Thursday" (paired)
    - "The Chimney Sweeper" (paired)
    - "The Little Boy lost" (paired)
    - "The Little Boy Found" (paired)
    - "The Divine Image" (paired)
    - "The Little Girl Lost" (paired)
    - "The Little Girl Found" (paired)
    - "The Tyger" (paired)
    - "The Human Abstract" (paired)
    - "Infant Sorrow" (paired)
- William Lisle Bowles, Fourteen Sonnets
- Charlotte Brooke, Reliques of Irish Poetry, anthology
- Thomas Cary, Abram's Plains, a long poem, the first English poetry published in Canada; private printing in Quebec
- Erasmus Darwin, The Loves of the Plants, the work proved popular and was republished in 1791 as the second part of The Botanic Garden
- John Ogilvie, The Fane of the Druids
- Thomas Russell, Sonnets and Miscellaneous Poems
- John Williams, publishing under the pen name "Anthony Pasquin", Poems: by Anthony Pasquin, Anglo-Irish poet and satirist published in the United Kingdom
- Mary Wollstonecraft, writing under the pen name "Mr. Cresswick", The Female Reader: Or, Miscellaneous Pieces, in Prose and Verse; selected from the best writers, and disposed under proper heads; for the improvement of young women. By Mr. Cresswick, teacher of elocution. To which is prefixed a preface, containing some hints on female education, London: Joseph Johnson, prose and poetry anthology

=== Other ===
- Jens Baggesen, Holger the Dane, a poem in which the author ridiculed the author's fellow Danes and expressed the wish of becoming a German; the author left Denmark for Germany as a result of the poem; published in the Spring; Denmark
- Elijah Fitch, the Beauties of Religion. A Poem, Addressed to Youth, United States
- Philip Phile, "The President's March", composed for the inauguration of George Washington, later retitled Hail, Columbia and arranged with lyrics by Joseph Hopkinson in 1798, when it stirred patriotic feelings in the United States at a time when war with France seemed imminent, United States
- Elizabeth Scott, "Awake, our drowsy souls", a Christian hymn which was popular in the US and the UK, passing into several hymnals and undergoing various changes

== Births ==
Death years link to the corresponding "[year] in poetry" article:

- January 5 – Thomas Pringle (died 1834), Scottish writer, poet and abolitionist
- March 18 – Charlotte Elliott (died 1871), English poet and hymn writer
- May 28 – Bernhard Severin Ingemann (died 1862), Danish poet, playwright and historical novelist
- August 17 – William Knox (died 1825), Scottish poet and journalist
- September 3 – Hannah Flagg Gould (died 1865), American poet
- September 24 – Richard Henry Wilde (died 1847), Irish-born American lawyer, politician and poet

== Deaths ==
Birth years link to the corresponding "[year] in poetry" article:

- January 23 – Frances Brooke (born 1724), English novelist, poet, essayist, playwright and translator
- July 30 – Frances Greville (born 1724/7), probably-Irish-born English poet
- October 19 – Lucretia Wilhelmina van Merken (born 1721), Dutch poet and playwright
- November 16 – Konrad Arnold Schmid (born 1716), German writer and philologist
- Hedvig Löfwenskiöld (born 1736), Swedish poet

== See also ==
- Poetry
