= Daniel Scott (lexicographer) =

English nonconformist minister, theological writer and lexicographer

Daniel Scott (1694–1759) was an English nonconformist minister, theological writer and lexicographer.

== Life ==
Born on 21 March 1694, he was a son by the second wife of Daniel Scott, a London merchant. Daniel was admitted to Merchant Taylors' School on 10 March 1704, but left to be educated for the ministry under Samuel Jones at Gloucester (where in 1711 he shared a bed with Thomas Secker, the future archbishop of Canterbury), and at Tewkesbury Academy, where in 1712 Joseph Butler. From Jones's academy Scott went on to the university of Leyden, which he entered on 13 August 1714, aged 20, as a student in theology. He appears again as a student of medicine on 20 June 1718, aged 25. He graduated LLD at Leyden on 16 May 1719. He is said to have graduated LLD at Utrecht, but his name is not in the Utrecht ‘Album Studiosorum,’ 1886. While at Utrecht he became a Baptist, and joined the Mennonite communion.

He appears for some time to have exercised the ministry at Colchester, and afterwards in London, but there is no record of his ministry. His main occupations were those of the scholar and the critic.

Scott died at Cheshunt on 29 March 1759, and was buried in the churchyard on 3 April. His will, dated 21 April 1755, was proved on 12 April 1759.

== Family ==
Scott never married.

His nephews were Joseph Nicol Scott and Thomas Scott; Elizabeth Scott was his niece.

== Works ==
His anonymous ‘Essay’ (1725) on the doctrine of the Trinity attempted a middle way between Samuel Clarke and Daniel Waterland, but may have satisfied nobody except Job Orton. The first edition of the ‘Essay’ is said to have been bought up and suppressed by Edmund Gibson, bishop of London. In notes to his version (1741) of St. Matthew, he makes a point of proving that Hebraisms of the New Testament have their parallels in classical Greek, and improved John Mill's collection of various readings, especially by a more accurate citation of oriental versions; Doddridge, his personal friend, in his ‘Family Expositor,’ refers to Scott's notes. His labours as a lexicographer were encouraged by Secker and Butler, to whom he dedicated the two volumes of his appendix to Henricus Stephanus's ‘Thesaurus’. The letter A, which fills more than half the first volume, is the only part printed as originally drawn up, the remainder being condensed.

He published:

- ‘Disputatio ... de Patria Potestate Romana,’ &c., Leyden, 1719.
- ‘An Essay towards a Demonstration of the Scripture-Trinity. By Philanthropus Londinensis,’ &c., 1725; 2nd edit., enlarged, 1738; 3rd edit. Sherborne [1778?], (abridged by Robert Goadby, with prefixed account of the author, probably by Orton).
- ‘A New Version of St. Matthew's Gospel: with Select Notes ... added, a Review of Dr. Mill's Notes,’ &c., 1741, 4to (the version is divided into thirty-four sections).
- ‘Appendix ad Thesaurum Græcæ Linguæ ab Hen. Stephano constructum, et ad Lexica Constantini & Scapulæ,’ &c., 1745–6, fol. 2 vols. This appendix, reviewed in ‘Nova Acta Eruditorum’ (Leipzig, May 1749, p. 241), is incorporated in the edition of Stephanus (1816–28) by Edmund Henry Barker, and is employed in the edition of Johannes Scapula (1820) by James Bailey and John Richardson Major.
