= Thomas Harmer =

British historian

Thomas Harmer (1715 – 27 November 1788) was an English Dissenting minister and the author of Observations on various Passages of Scripture.

== Life ==
Thomas Harmer was educated for the ministry at the Fund Academy in Tenter Alley, Moorfields, under Thomas Ridgley and John Eames. Thomas Harmer was the pastor of an independent church in Wattisfield, near Bury St. Edmunds, in the county of Suffolk, England. He was eminent in the study of antiquities and Oriental literature.

Availing himself of the manuscripts of Sir John Chardin, renowned for the accounts of his travels into Persia and other Eastern countries and describing the customs and manners of the inhabitants of those nations, Rev. Harmer applied the information to illustrate prophetical and evangelist writings.

The results of his study appeared in 'Observations on various Passages of Scripture' (1774), which saw four editions during his life.

Thomas Harmer died on Thursday 27 November 1788. His funeral sermon was preached by John Mead Ray of Sudbury. His successor was Habakkuk Crabb.

== Publications ==
- Observations on Divers Passages of Scripture from Books of Voyages and Travels, (1764),
- Outlines of a new Commentary on Solomon's Song by help of Instructions from the East, (1768)
- Some Account of the Jewish Doctrine of the Resurrection, (1771)

This last publication, with others, including Remarks on the Ancient and Present State of the Congregational Churches of Norfolk and Suffolk, is reprinted in Miscellaneous Works, (1823), edited, with memoir, by William Youngman. His manuscript accounts of almost all the dissenting churches of Norfolk and Suffolk to 1774 have been used by John Browne (1823-1886), the non-conformist historian of those counties.
