= John Eames =

English Dissenting tutor

John Eames (2 February 1686 – 29 June 1744) was an English Dissenting tutor.

== Life ==
Eames was born in London on 2 February 1686. He was admitted to Merchant Taylors' School on 10 March 1696–7, and was subsequently trained for the dissenting ministry. He preached only once and seems never to have been ordained.

In 1712 Thomas Ridgley, D.D., became theological tutor to the Fund Academy, in Tenter Alley, Moorfields, an institution supported by the congregational fund board. Eames was appointed assistant tutor, his subjects being classics and science. On Ridgley's death (27 March 1734) he succeeded him as theological tutor, handing over his previous duties to Joseph Densham, one of his pupils. His reputation as a tutor, especially in natural science, was great; it appears that Thomas Secker attended his classes (in 1716–17, at the time when he was turning his thoughts towards medicine as a profession). He enjoyed the friendship of Sir Isaac Newton, through whose influence he was elected Fellow of the Royal Society. He was employed in abridging the Society's Philosophical Transactions.

Of his theological work nothing remains; on 13 February 1735 he took part with Samuel Chandler and Jeremiah Hunt, in an arranged debate with two Roman Catholic priests, at the Bell Tavern in Nicholas Lane. Eames, who was unmarried, died suddenly on 29 June 1744, a few hours after giving his usual lecture. He was buried in Bunhill Fields burial ground.

== Works ==
He published nothing of his own, but was concerned in the following:

- The Knowledge of the Heavens and Earth made easy (1726), by Isaac Watts, edited by Eames.
- The Philosophical Transactions, from 1719 to 1733, abridged, by John Eames and John Martyn (1734), 2 vols; being vols 6 (in 2 parts) and 7 of the series.
- A General Index of all the matters contained in the seven vols. of the Philosophical Transactions abridged, (1735): (seems to have been the work of Eames and Martyn).
