= Henry Crabb Robinson =

English writer (1775–1867)

Henry Crabb Robinson FSA
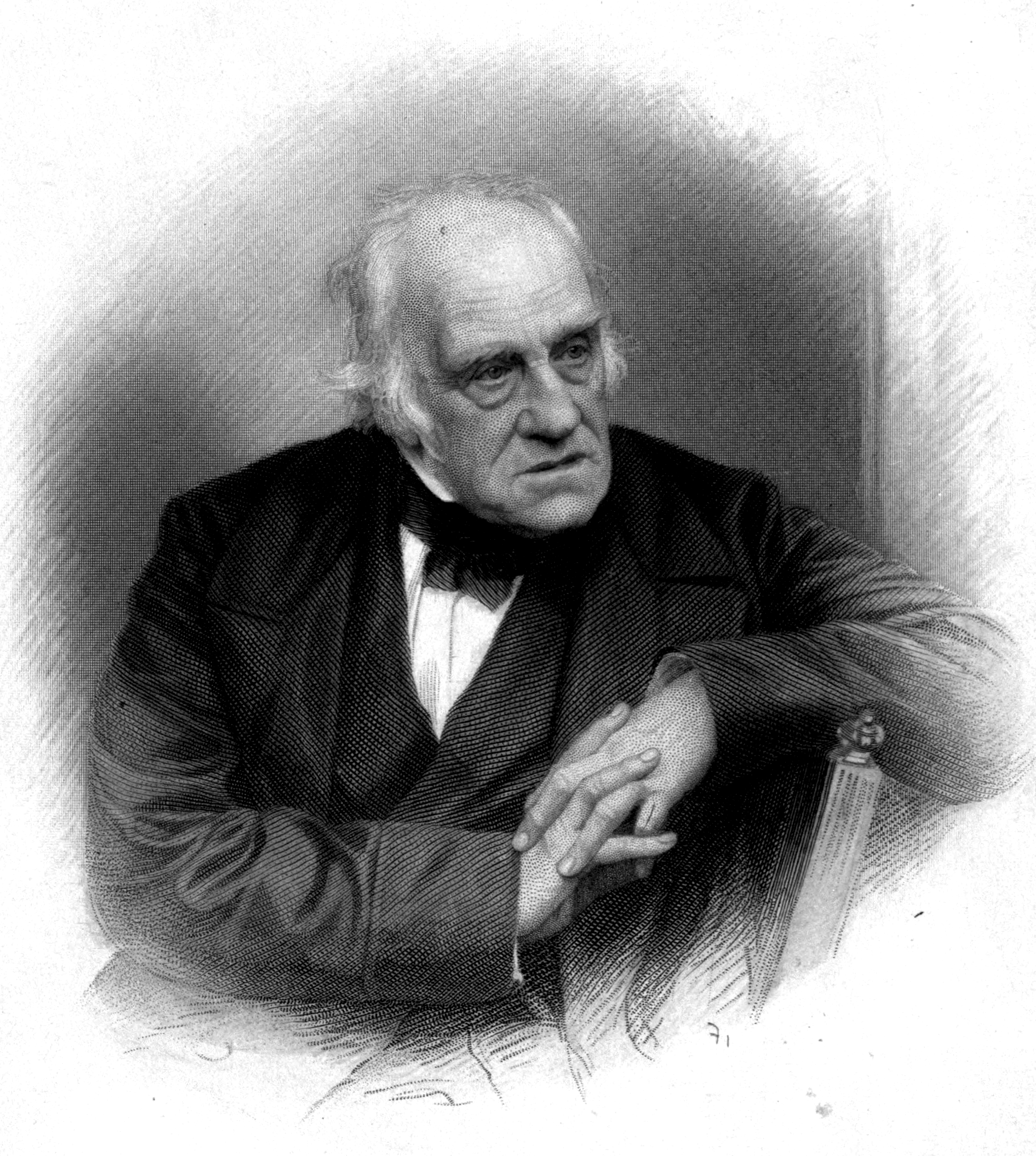
- 1869 engraving by William Holl the younger after a photograph of Henry Crabb Robinson
- Born: 13 May 1775; Bury St Edmunds, England
- Died: 5 February 1867 (aged 91); London, England
- Occupations: Writer; scholar

Academic background
- Education: University of Jena
- Academic advisor: F. W. J. Schelling

Henry Crabb Robinson (13 May 1775 – 5 February 1867) was an English writer and scholar. He was a renowned diarist who was most famous for his correspondence with major literary figures of the Romantic era including Samuel Taylor Coleridge, Charles Lamb, William Blake, and William Wordsworth. Throughout his lifetime, he was also a lawyer and established a legal practice. Additionally, he was a founding member of University College London.

== Life ==
Robinson was born in Bury St. Edmunds, Suffolk, as the third and youngest son of Henry Robinson (1736–1815) and Jemima (1736–1793), daughter of Denny Crabb, a landowner, maltster, and deacon of the congregational church at Wattisfield, Suffolk, and sister of Habakkuk Crabb.

After education at small private schools, he was articled in 1790 to an attorney in Colchester. At Colchester he heard John Wesley preach one of his last sermons. In 1796, he entered the office of a solicitor in Chancery Lane, London; but in 1798 a relative died, leaving Robinson a sum yielding a considerable yearly income. Proud of his independence and eager for travel, he went abroad in 1800. Between 1800 and 1805, he studied at various places in Germany, meeting men of letters there, including Goethe, Schiller, Johann Gottfried Herder and Christoph Martin Wieland. He then became correspondent for The Times in Altona in 1807. Later on he was sent to Galicia, in Spain, as a war correspondent in the Peninsular War.

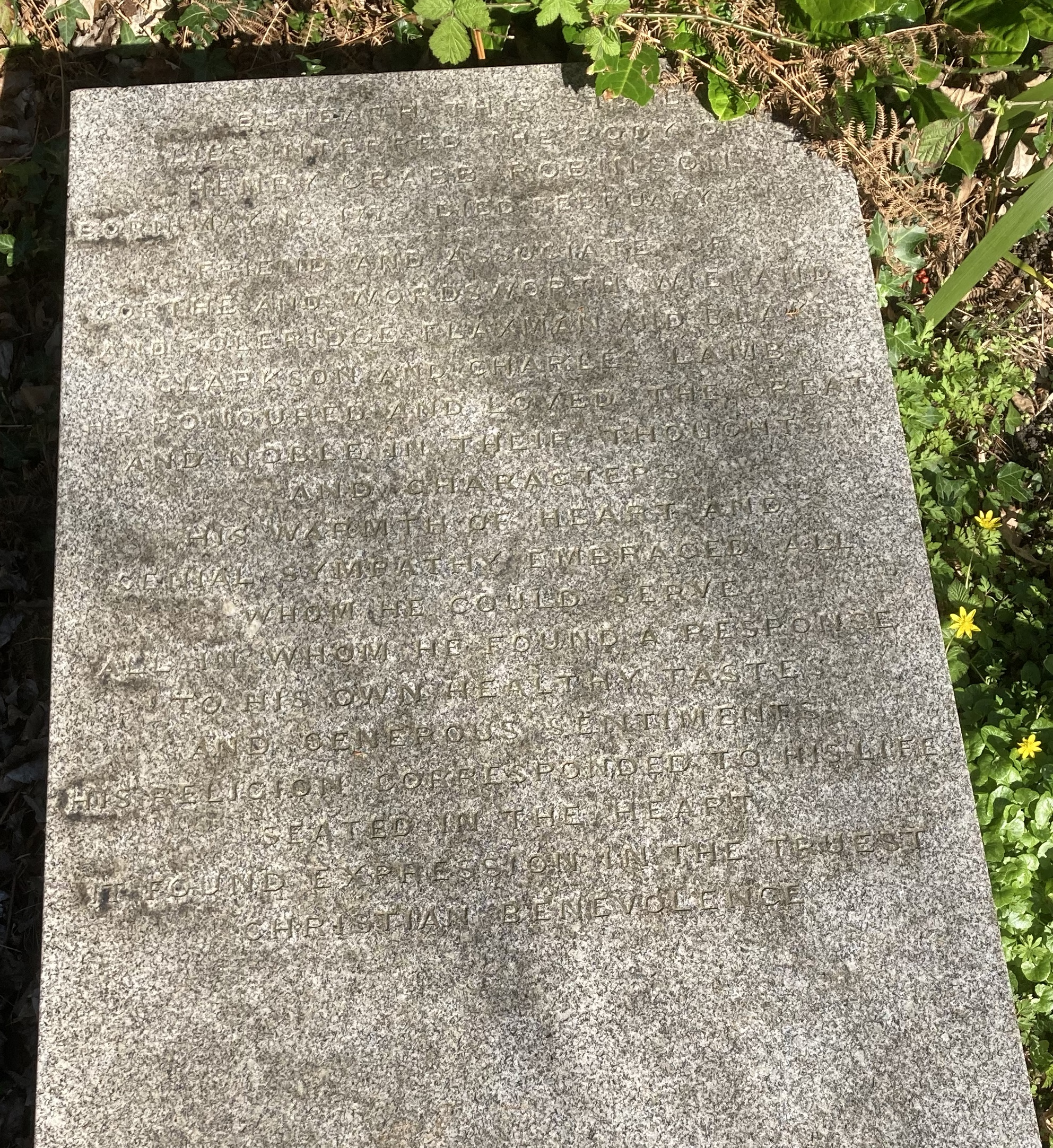
Grave of Henry Crabb Robinson in Highgate Cemetery

On his return to London in 1809, Robinson decided to quit journalism and studied for the Bar, to which he was called in 1813, and became leader of the Eastern Circuit. Fifteen years later he retired, and by virtue of his conversation and qualities became a leader in society. He was one of the founders of the London University (now University College London) and travelled several times to Italy, as many of his contemporaries did. Among those whom he befriended in Rome in 1829 was the novelist Sarah Burney.

Robinson died unmarried, aged 91. He was buried in a vault in Highgate Cemetery alongside his friend Edwin Wilkins Field. A bust of Crabb Robinson was made, and a portrait by Edward Armitage.

== Work ==
Robinson's Diary, Reminiscences and Correspondence was published posthumously in 1869. It contains reminiscences of central figures of the English romantic movement: including Coleridge, Charles Lamb, William Blake, William Wordsworth, and of other writers such as Sarah Burney. They are documents on the daily lives of London writers, artists, political figures and socialites. In his essay on Blake, Swinburne says, "Of all the records of these his latter years, the most valuable, perhaps, are those furnished by Mr. Crabb Robinson, whose cautious and vivid transcription of Blake's actual speech is worth more than much vague remark, or than any commentary now possible to give."

In 1829, Robinson was made a fellow of the Society of Antiquaries (FSA), and contributed a paper to Archæologia entitled "The Etymology of the Mass".

== Collections ==
Robinson's diaries were bequeathed to Dr Williams's Library, because Robinson had been a member of the Essex Street Chapel, the first avowedly Unitarian congregation in England.

University College London holds one letterbook containing copies of letters to various correspondents concerning the Flaxman Gallery; the Flaxman Gallery, named after artist John Flaxman, was Robinson's creation.
