= Thomas Ridgley =

English Dissenting minister

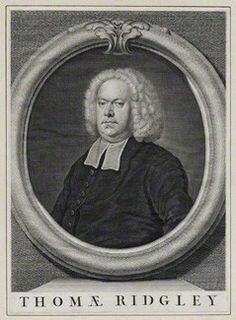
Thomas Ridgley (c. 1667–1734)

Thomas Ridgley (c. 1667 – 1734) was an English Dissenting minister.

== Life ==
Thomas Ridgley was born in London around 1667. He was educated for the ministry in Wiltshire, presumably under John Davison at Trowbridge. In 1695, he was chosen assistant to Thomas Gouge, pastor of the independent church at Three Cranes, Fruiterers' Alley, Thames Street, London. On Gouge's death he succeeded to the pastorate, which he held till his own death, being assisted by John Hurrion and (from 1732) by Samuel Parsons. On the death of Isaac Chauncy, in 1712, he was elected divinity tutor to the Fund Academy in Tenter Alley, Moorfields, established by the London congregational fund board in 1696. His coadjutor in classics and science was John Eames. Ridgley had abundance of theological learning, and was a good instructor. His position as a teacher was that of a bulwark of dissenting orthodoxy against the prevalent tendencies to Arian and Arminian laxity. This duty he discharged with great ability and considerable individuality of treatment.

His scheme of the Trinity, denuded of the generation of the Son and the procession of the Spirit, is essentially Sabellian, and in easing the difficulties of Calvinism he follows the Socinians in limiting the penalties of Adam's sin to death and temporal discomfort.

In 1719, he took the side of subscription in the Salters' Hall debates, thus ranging himself with the older presbyterians; while Hunt, Lowman, Lardner, and Jennings, his juniors among the learned independents, were for non-subscription. His lectures expository of the larger catechism of the Westminster divines constitute his 'Body of Divinity,' which, issued by subscription in 1731, became a textbook of moderate Calvinism, and gained him the diploma of D.D. from Aberdeen.

Ridgley died on 27 March 1734, aged 66, and was buried in Bunhill Fields. His portrait by Bartholomew Dandridge was engraved by Vandergucht.

== Publications ==
He published, besides single sermons, including funeral sermons for Gertrude Clarkson (1701), Elizabeth Bankes (1711), Nathan Hall (1719), Thomas Tingey (1729), John Hurrion (1732), and John Sladen (1733, two editions same year):

- The Unreasonableness of the Charge of Creed-making, (1719), (related to the Salters' Hall controversy),
- An Essay Concerning Truth and Charity, (1721), (related to the Salters' Hall controversy),
- The Doctrine of Original Sin, (1725); two editions same year (two lectures at Pinners' Hall, with postscript)
- A Body of Divinity, (1731)
