= Habakkuk Crabb =

Habakkuk Crabb (1750–1794) was a dissenting British minister.

== Youth ==
Crabb was born at Wattisfield, Suffolk, in 1750, being the second youngest of fifteen children. His father, Denny Crabb, was a deacon of the congregational church at Wattisfield. He was a man of private property, who, as his family grew in number, was obliged to farm one of his estates and became a maltster. Habakkuk was a pupil of John Walker, congregational minister at Framlingham, and in 1766 Crabb proceeded to Daventry Academy under Caleb Ashworth. He injured his constitution by close study.

== Career ==
Leaving Daventry in 1771 he became minister at Stowmarket, where he was ordained on 3 June 1772. In 1776 he moved to Cirencester, and then to Devizes, as assistant to his brother-in-law, John Ludd Fenner, in 1787. On 25 February 1789, upon the death of Thomas Harmer, Crabb undertook the pastorate at his native place, but his theology (he was probably an Arian) was too latitudinarian for the congregationalists of Wattisfield; he resigned the charge on 15 August 1790, and became minister at Royston. The more orthodox portion of the congregation quietly seceded. Crabb was much beloved by his own people, and esteemed by all. He died after a short illness on 25 December 1794. Robert Hall delivered a funeral oration on New Year's Day 1795, assisted by another family friend, John Towill Rutt of London. Hall stated:

...the character of Mr. Crabb was too well established, and held in too high esteem, to have any thing to hope from praise, or to fear from censure. His mild and gentle spirit rendered it nearly impossible for him to have any enemies. The innocence and sanctity of his behaviour, the sensibility of his heart, the fidelity with which he discharged the duties of life, and the equanimity with which he bore its rebukes and sufferings, will leave a lasting impression on the minds of all his friends and acquaintance. You of this church and congregation have lost a friend, an instructor, a pastor; one who was anxious, on every occasion, to promote your spiritual and eternal welfare; who knew how to “rejoice with them that rejoice, and weep with them that weep.”

== Family ==
In 1778 he married Eliza Norman of Stowmarket, who died in childbed in 1792, and left seven children. Though his sister Jemima, the diarist Henry Crabb Robinson was his nephew.

== Works ==
- Sermons on Practical Subjects, Cambridge, 1796, (posthumous publication, published by subscription for the benefit of his family).

== Sources ==
This article incorporates text from a publication now in the public domain: Stephen, Leslie, ed. (1887). "Crabb, Habakkuk". Dictionary of National Biography. Vol. 12. London: Smith, Elder & Co.
