= John Brekell =

English presbyterian minister and theological writer

John Brekell (1697–1769) was an English presbyterian minister and theological writer.

== Life ==
Brekell was born at North Meols, Lancashire, in 1697, and was educated for the ministry at Nottingham, at the dissenting academy of John Hardy. His first known settlement was at Stamford, Lincolnshire, apparently as assistant, but he did not stay long. He went to assist Christopher Bassnett at Kaye Street, Liverpool, 1729. Joshua Toulmin prints a letter (dated Liverpool, 3 December 1730) from Brekell to Rev. Thomas Pickard of Birmingham, showing that Brekell had been asked to Birmingham, but had 'handsome encouragement to continue' where he was. The date, April 1732, given by James Martineau, may be that of Brekell's admission to the status of a colleague after ordination.

On Bassnett's death on 22 July 1744 Brekell became sole pastor. His ministry covers the period between the rise of the evangelical liberalism of Philip Doddridge (his correspondent, and the patron of his first publication), and the avowal of Socinianism by Joseph Priestley, to whose Theological Repository he contributed in the last year of his life. Brekell, though his later treatment of the atonement shows Socinian influence, stood firm on the person of Christ. In his sermons he makes considerable use of his classic literature. Nathaniel Lardner quotes him as a critic of the ante-Nicene writers.

There arose a burning question among Liverpool presbyterians in reference to a form of prayer. At length a section of the Liverpool laity, holding what they termed "free" views in theology, built the Octagon Chapel, printed a Form of Prayer and a new Collection of Psalms, 1763 (the Liverpool Liturgy, as it became known) and brought in a minister from London. The leading spirit in this movement was Thomas Bentley, Wedgwood's partner. His manuscript correspondence deals with Brekell, whom he treats as representing the "presbyterian hierarchy". Brekell did all he could by pamphlets in 1762 to show the inexpediency of forms of prayer. The new chapel was sold to a Liverpool clergyman on 25 February 1776. Brekell died on 28 December 1769. He married, on 11 November 1736, his wife's name being Elizabeth, and had five children.

== Works ==
His first publication was The Christian Warfare … a Discourse on making our Calling and Election sure; with an Appendix concerning the Persons proper to be admitted to the Lord's Supper, 1742. Following the example of his predecessor, he preached and published a sermon to sailors, Euroclydon, or the Dangers of the Sea considered and improved, &c. (Acts xxvii.), 1744. Then came Liberty and Loyalty, 1746, (a Hanoverian pamphlet).

The Divine Oracles, or the Sufficiency of the Holy Scriptures, &c., 1749, is a reply to a work by Thomas Deacon, M.D., of Manchester, a nonjuring bishop. At this date (see pp. 72, 74) Brekell sides with Athanasius against the Arians. He published also on Holy Orders, 1752, and two tracts in vindication of Paedobaptism, 1753 and 1755. Brekell's name appears among the subscribers to a work by Whitfield, a Liverpool printer and sugar refiner, who had left the presbyterians, entitled A Dissertation on Hebrew Vowel-points. After Whitfield's lapse, Brekell wrote An Essay on the Hebrew Tongue, being an attempt to shew that the Hebrew Bible might be originally read by Vowel Letters without the Vowel Points, 1758, 2 pts (1763).

Brekell wrote tracts on Baptizing sick and dying Infants, Glasgow, 1760, and on Regeneration, 1761. He published a dissertation on Circumcision, 1763, a volume of sermons, The Grounds and Principles of the Christian Revelation, 1765, and A Discourse on Music, 1766. Toulmin gives the titles of sixteen of his publications. It adds: All at Stoke: or an Earnest Persuasive to a Vigorous Self-defence, &c. By J. B., author of the Christian Warfare, &c., Liverpool, 1745, (a sermon (Luke xxii. 36) dedicated 'more especially to the Gentlemen Volunteers of Liverpool, and the Regiment of Blues raised at their own expense by that Loyal Town and Corporation. At the end is a warlike 'Hymn suitable to the Occasion of the general Fast to be observed with a view to the present War, both Foreign and Domestic'); also a Sermon (Phil. i. 11) on the Liverpool Infirmary, 1769, (his last publication). The signature to his papers in the Theological Repository, vol. i. 1769, and vol. ii. 1771, is 'Verus.'
