= Judith Godwin (correspondent) =

- Born: Radnorshire, Wales
- Died: 25 January 1746; Watford, England
- Known for: Correspondent of Howel Harris
- Spouses: Samuel Jones (died 1719); Edward Godwin (m. 1721)

Judith Godwin (died 25 January 1746) was a noted correspondent of Howel Harris and ancestor of Mary Shelley.

== Life ==
Godwin was born in Radnorshire in Wales. Her maiden name was Weaver and it was thought, although incorrectly according to her biographer Robert Thomas Jenkins, that she was a child of the Puritan minister at Radnor named John Weaver. She married the controversial academic Samuel Jones. He had founded an academy at Tewkesbury in 1713 which faced difficulties and he had turned to drink. Jones married Godwin shortly before his death at Tewkesbury on 11 October 1719 aged thirty-seven.

Godwin was a noted correspondent who later married Edward Godwin, her husband's former student, in 1721. She held non-conformist views and she was described as "quasi-Methodist". Her friends included Vavasor Griffiths, Howel Harris and Lewis Rees who were all independent ministers. Howel Harris was a religious reformer and they had a long friendship during which they exchanged over 40 letters.

Godwin died in Watford, Hertfordshire, on 25 January 1746.

== Legacy ==
Edward and Judith Godwin were the parents of Edward who was born in 1722 and John Godwin who was born the following year. John was an Independent minister who was the father of radical philosopher and theologian William Godwin, husband and biographer of the philosopher Mary Wollstonecraft. They were the parents of the writer Mary Shelley (and Judith was her grandmother).
