= Thomas Scott (hymnwriter) =

English nonconformist minister

Thomas Scott (1705 – 7 November 1775) was an English nonconformist minister and a writer of hymns.

== Life ==
He was a younger son of Thomas Scott, an Independent minister at Hitchin, Hertfordshire, where he was born, and later of Norwich; he was the brother of Joseph Nicol Scott and Elizabeth Scott, and nephew of Dr. Daniel Scott.

He was probably educated by his father, and while still young took charge of a small boarding-school at Wortwell, in the parish of Redenhall, Norfolk. While there he once a month preached to the Independent congregation at Harleston in the same parish.

In 1733 Scott became minister of the dissenting congregation at Lowestoft, Suffolk. While perhaps retaining this office till 1738, in 1734 he succeeded Samuel Say as colleague to Samuel Baxter at St. Nicholas Street Chapel, Ipswich. On Baxter's death on 13 July 1740 he became sole pastor, and remained so till 1761, when Peter Emans became his colleague, followed by Robert Lewin (1762–1770), and William Wood (1770–1773). Except during the three years of Wood's ministry, the congregation languished.

On 26 April 1774, but in broken health, Scott was elected minister by the trustees of an endowed chapel at Hapton, Norfolk.

He died at Hapton on 7 November 1775, and was buried in the parish churchyard. He was married and left children.

== Works ==
Some of Scott's hymns (e.g. Absurd and vain attempt, Imposture shrinks from light) are odes to independence of thought; but Hasten, sinner, to be wise and Happy the meek are in different veins. Eleven of his hymns were first contributed to Hymns for Public Worship, Warrington, 1772, edited by William Enfield Most of his hymns are contained in his Lyric Poems (1773); others are in the Collection of 1795 by Andrew Kippis, Abraham Rees, and others.

Scott published four single sermons (1740–59), including a funeral sermon for Samuel Baxter; other works were:

- A Father's Instructions to his Son, 1748, (verse).
- The Table of Cebes … in English verse, with Notes, 1754.
- The Anglers, 1758, verse dialogues on fishing. It was later plagiarised by Thomas Pike Lathy.
- The Book of Job, in English verse … from the original … with Remarks, 1771; 2nd edit. 1773.
- Lyric Poems, Devotional and Moral, 1773.
