= Nathaniel Lardner =

English theologian (1684–1768)

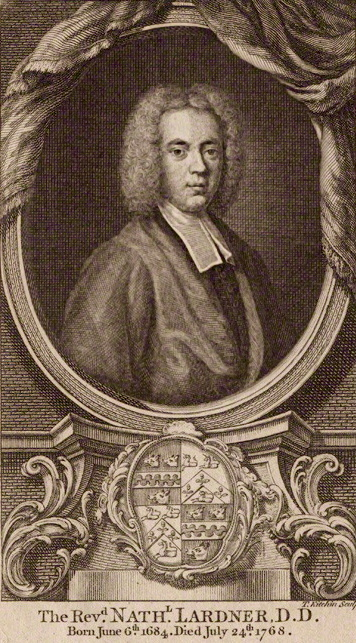
- Born: 6 June 1684; Hawkhurst, England, Kingdom of England
- Died: 24 July 1768 (aged 84); Hawkhurst, England, Great Britain
- Education: Marischal College (DD)

Nathaniel Lardner (6 June 1684 – 24 July 1768) was an English Presbyterian minister and theologian.

== Life ==
Lardner was born in Hawkhurst, Kent in 1684. He was the elder son of Richard Lardner (1653–1740), an independent minister, and of a daughter of Nathaniel Collyer or Collier, a Southwark tradesman. His sister Elizabeth married Daniel Neal, who studied with Lardner in Utrecht.

After studying for the Presbyterian ministry in London, and also at Utrecht and Leiden, he took license as a preacher in 1709, but was not successful. In 1713, he entered the family of Lady Treby, widow of Sir George Treby, as tutor and domestic chaplain, where he remained until 1721. In 1724 he was appointed to deliver the Tuesday evening lecture in the Presbyterian chapel, Old Jewry, London, and in 1729 he became assistant minister to the Presbyterian congregation in Crutched Friars. He graduated with a degree of DD from Marischal College in Aberdeen in 1743. He died in Hawkhurst on 24 July 1768.

== Works ==
An anonymous volume of Memoirs appeared in 1769; and a life by Andrew Kippis is prefixed to the edition of the Works of Lardner, first published in 1788. The full title of his principal work—a work which, although now out of date, entitles its author to be regarded as the founder of modern critical research in the field of early Christian literature—is The Credibility of the Gospel History; or the Principal Facts of the New Testament confirmed by Passages of Ancient Authors, who were contemporary with our Saviour or his Apostles, or lived near their time. Part 1, in 2 octavo volumes, appeared in 1727; the publication of part 2, in 12 octavo volumes, began in 1733 and ended in 1755. In 1730 there was a second edition of part 1, and the Additions and Alterations were also published separately. A Supplement, otherwise entitled A History of the Apostles and Evangelists, Writers of the New Testament, was added in 3 volumes (1756–1757), and reprinted in 1760.

Other works by Lardner are A Large Collection of Ancient Jewish and Heathen Testimonies to the Truth of the Christian Revelation, with Notes and Observations (4 volumes, quarto, 1764–1767); The History of the Heretics of the two first Centuries after Christ, published posthumously in 1780; and a considerable number of occasional sermons.

== Theology ==
Lardner made a case against the subordinationism of Samuel Clarke in which the eternal Logos unites with a human body in the man Jesus, opposed to the Trinitarian view. Lardner went further to argue that the New Testament does not teach that Jesus or any element within him pre-existed Mary's pregnancy. According to Lardner the Logos of John 1:1, was to be understood as a divine attribute, which metaphorically “became flesh” in the man Jesus, and other traditional pre-existence proof texts are interpreted in ways consistent with Christ's not existing before his conception. Lardner analyzes the use of “spirit” in the Bible and concludes that it refers to God, or to various of God's properties, actions, or gifts. This view was essentially Socinian.

== Networking ==
He was in close relations with Thomas Secker, exchanged letters with Edward Waddington, and had a large literary correspondence with continental scholars, and with the ministers of New England. Among his English dissenting correspondents were John Brekell, Samuel Chandler, Philip Doddridge, and Henry Miles. He corresponded also with Thomas Morgan the Welsh deist and moral philosopher, of very different views but who found Lardner impartial.
