= Malachi Jones (clergyman) =

British dissenting preacher (c. 1651–1729)

Malachi Jones (c. 1651–1729) was a British clergyman and missionary active in late 17th- and early 18th-century England and Pennsylvania. He is best known as the father of the Dissenting educator Samuel Jones and as the founder of Abington Presbyterian Church in Abington Township, Montgomery County, Pennsylvania.

== Jones in Britain ==
Jones was born 1651 or 1652, probably in England or Wales. His earliest recorded residence is in the Parish of Clodock, Herefordshire, where he was employed as a tanner between 1693 and 1694.

Jones was a Dissenting preacher in "the welch part of Herefordshire" sometime after 1689. His ministry was supported by the Congregational Fund in London, which provided Jones with at least four grants between 1697 and 1704.

In or about 1682 Jones married. The surname of his wife, Mary, is not recorded. The couple had several children, including Samuel Jones, who became a notable educator.

== Immigration to America ==
Between 1711 and 1713, Jones left Britain for America. One report has him in Abington, Pennsylvania, in 1711. However, another source indicates that in May 1713, a "Malachy Jones" sailed from Bristol bound for Pennsylvania aboard the frigate "Foy". Other passengers on this voyage, such as one Sarah Abraham (possibly a resident of Clodock and later a founding member of Abington Presbyterian Church) appear to be associates of Jones. It is possible, therefore, that Jones returned to Britain at least once before permanently settling in Pennsylvania.

Most of Jones's children also immigrated to Pennsylvania at this time. One son, however, Samuel Jones, remained in Britain. Samuel established a Dissenting Academy in Tewkesbury, Gloucestershire, and is buried in Tewkesbury Abbey.

== Jones in America ==
Before emigrating, Jones worked with the Congregational Fund, a Congregational missionary society based in London, and it seems that he came to America in order to establish Congregational churches on behalf of the Fund. However, shortly after his arrival, he adopted Presbyterian principles, and was instrumental in organizing at least two churches under presbyterian governance.

In 1714 Jones organized and became the founding minister of Abington Presbyterian Church in Abington, Pennsylvania. In addition to acting as minister, Jones also provided his house as a meeting place for the early church. Later, Jones furnished land from his farm "to build a House for the Publick Worship of God And also a place for Burying the Dead." The church is still in the property Jones provided.

In 1719, Jones helped to organize Bensalem Dutch Reformed Church (now Bensalem Presbyterian Church) in Bensalem, Pennsylvania. Jones also served as supply pastor to other local Presbyterian and Dutch Reformed congregations, including Great Valley Presbyterian Church (another congregation Jones helped to establish), Presbyterian Church, North and South Hampton Dutch Reformed Church, Norriton Presbyterian Church, and Neshaminy Dutch Reformed Church (now Addisville Reformed Church), whose Dutch speaking congregation knew as him the "Rev. Mallegie Jons".

Jones served at Abington Presbyterian Church until his death in 1729. He seems to have preached regularly at Bensalem Dutch Reformed Church, as well as the other churches he helped to organize, until his death.

Jones was notably active in the early years of the Presbytery of Philadelphia, the first presbytery organized in the United States. Jones was among the first ministers of the newly founded Presbytery, and his service helped guide its early development. In particular, his work on numerous committees contributed to the success of the early presbytery.

Jones was an irenic and conciliatory churchman who worked successfully among the diverse and at times conflicting ethnic and confessional groups within early American Presbyterianism. The differences among these groups contributed to the Old Side–New Side Controversy which, shortly after Jones's death, divided American Presbyterianism into two camps. Even amidst early signs of this division, however, Jones successfully pastored mixed congregations of Welsh, English, Dutch, and Ulster Scots at Abington, Bensalem, and other churches.

Jones's ministry at the Bensalem Dutch Reformed Church provides an example of his success in ministering to the diverse population of Colonial Pennsylvania. This church was formed, in part, by Dutch congregants of Abington Presbyterian Church who wished to found a church reflecting their distinctive linguistic and Dutch Reformed confessional heritage. Nevertheless, the Bensalem congregation, along with other Dutch Reformed churches where Jones preached, had no objection to the ministry of Jones, and frequently requested his services in the early years their church.

Moreover, Jones managed to work successfully within a presbytery often dominated by colleagues drawn from Scottish and Ulster Scots Presbyterian churches, who held stricter views on church governance and doctrine than Jones. Jones, along with his Nonconforming colleagues, who had suffered the hardships of Nonconformity under the Established Church of England, found these stricter views uncomfortably reminiscent of the burdens under which they had labored before finding relief in the New World. Jones's Scottish colleagues, on the other hand, objected to the looser doctrinal standards of the early Pennsylvania church. Their more favorable experience within the established Church of Scotland inclined them to welcome a degree of uniformity that Jones and his colleagues found objectionable. Nevertheless, Jones found ways to contribute to the success of the early presbytery.

Although relations within Jones's congregations were usually amicable, one rare instance of church discipline illustrates some of the difficulties facing a Colonial minister in what was still a lightly settled frontier region. In 1728 Jones and the session of the Neshaminy Church felt compelled to excommunicate one of their members after he was found guilty of a number of offenses: "1st, of being a notorious lyer; 2ly, a notorious swerer; 3ly, of cheating and Robbing whoever would give him any credit; 4ly, armed himself with weapons to kill and murder such as would come according to Law to demand their rights, whether in their own persons or by the King's officers, and thus Rebelling against the Government; 5ly, of Running away out of y^{e} Province with other men's goods." It is not recorded whether this prodigal later repented, or continued, among his other offenses, to lie and swear.

== Death and legacy ==
Jones died in 1729 and is buried at Abington Presbyterian Church Cemetery. After his death, his colleagues noted that he was "a good man, and did good." His legacy includes his contribution to what is now the Presbyterian Church (U.S.A.) (PC(USA)) as well as his service to the individual churches he helped to establish, among which Abington Presbyterian, Bensalem Presbyterian, and Great Valley Presbyterian continue to this day as active congregations.
