= Christopher Bassnett =

English nonconformist minister

Christopher Bassnett (1677 – 22 July 1744) was an English nonconformist minister.

== Life ==
He entered Richard Frankland's Rathmell Academy as student for the Presbyterian ministry on 1 April 1696. He was an intimate friend of Matthew Henry, who says in a manuscript diary, 20 July 1709, "recommended Mr. Basnet to Liverpool", and 1 August "he is inclined to accept."

He ministered to the congregation at Kaye or Key Street, Liverpool, then included in the Warrington presbyterian classis (meeting-house opened on 24 Nov. 1707). He was incapacitated by illness from 23 March 1711 to 26 January 1712. He married, on 9 February 1713, Mrs. Cheney of Manchester, daughter of the Rev. Samuel Eaton (died 1729). He assisted in establishing a school for the free education of poor children in Liverpool in 1716. He had John Brekell as a colleague from 1728. He died on 22 July 1744, aged 68.

== Works ==
- Zebulun's Blessing opened and applied, &c., 1714 (eight sermons to seafaring men and traders, occasioned by the construction of a new dock, and known for the comment on Luke xiv. 20: "But why could not the fool bring his wife along with him?" &c., p. 55)
- Church Officers and their Mission, &c., 1717 (sermon at ordination of Henry Winder and Benjamin Mather at St. Helen's).
