= Tewkesbury Academy =

Defunct learning center in England

Information
- School type: Dissenting academy
- Religious affiliation: English Dissenters
- Founder: Samuel Jones

The Tewkesbury Academy was an important centre of learning for the Dissenters of Tewkesbury, Gloucestershire, England, during the early 18th century. It was run by Samuel Jones and its students included both Dissenters such as Samuel Chandler and those who became significant Establishment figures such as Thomas Secker, who later became the Archbishop of Canterbury (1758–68), and Joseph Butler.

== Background ==
The Dissenting academies were an important part of England’s educational systems. It was difficult for any but practising members of the Church of England to gain admission to the old universities: Cambridge and Oxford. The Dissenters included nonconformist Protestants who could not in good conscience subscribe to the articles of the Church of England, but also Quakers, Roman Catholics, and Jews. As their sons were debarred from preparing for the ministry or the professions in the universities, many of them attended the dissenting academies.

== Beginnings ==
After finishing his education at Leiden, Samuel Jones moved to Gloucester, opening his academy in the Barton Street house of Henry Wintle, a Presbyterian. From the outset, the Academy was popular; over its short existence, it was to educate around one hundred students, mostly for the dissenting ministries, making it the largest academy of its type in the south of England. Jones's learning in Jewish antiquities and reformed theology encouraged students from across the country to attend his lectures.

This was in the face of state persecution. Under the 1662 Act of Uniformity, all schools and academies needed to be licensed by the local bishop, a situation which was not repealed (or even subjected to immunity from prosecution) by the Act of Toleration 1689. In September 1712, Jones was presented at the ecclesiastical court under the Act of Uniformity for keeping a school or seminary which had not been licensed. One of the most serious charges was that he infiltrated "seditious and antimonarchical principles" into his students. In the light of comments made by his students such as Thomas Mole, it seems unlikely that Jones's establishment was through-and-through "prejudicial to the present Establishment".

== Growth ==
Jones moved the academy to Tewkesbury early in summer 1713, at least partly in order to move to a bigger house; one of his students, possibly Secker, lent him £200 to enable his move; he repaid it over several years. Persecution of the Academy continued, however; following the Henry Sacheverell affair and the attempted passing of Schism bills in parliament, Jones's house was attacked by rioters on the day of the coronation of George I. This local hostility reflects the merger of popular politics and anti-academy state propaganda during Queen Anne's rule.

== Decline ==
The academy soon faced new problems. After moving to Tewkesbury, Jones became an increasingly heavy drinker and his teaching declined in quality and success. He died at Tewkesbury on 11 October 1719 aged thirty-seven, and was succeeded at the academy by his nephew, by Jeremiah Jones (1693-1724), who removed the Academy to Nailsworth. However, it soon declined in size and reputation.

== People associated with it ==
These students included future conformists of great eminence, such as Thomas Secker (later Archbishop of Canterbury), as well as major dissenting theologians and controversialists, such as Samuel Chandler.

Isaac Watts encouraged Secker to attend the Tewkesbury Academy. Contemporaneously with Secker were the later Church of England bishops Joseph Butler and Isaac Maddox, and John Bowes, later Lord Chancellor of Ireland.

In addition to Chandler, the future dissenting leader Vavasour Griffiths was also a member.

== Description of life at the Academy ==
The most detailed account of the academy was left by Thomas Secker. Writing to Isaac Watts, an eminent London dissenter who had encouraged him to study under Jones, Secker wrote:

"Mr. Jones [...] I take to be a man of real piety, great learning, and an agreeable temper; one who is very diligent in instructing all under his care, very well qualified to give instructions, and whose well-managed familiarity will always make him respected. He is very strict in keeping good orders, and will effectually preserve his pupils from negligence and immorality. And accordingly I believe there are not many academies freer in general from those vices than we are. In particular, my bedfellow Mr. Scott is one of unfeigned religion, and a diligent searcher after truth. His genteel carriage and agreeable disposition gain him the esteem of every one. Mr. Griffith is more than ordinary serious and grave, and improves more in every thing than one could expect from a man who seems to be not much under forty; particularly in Greek and Hebrew he has made a great progress. Mr. Francis and Mr. Watkins are diligent in study and truly religious. The elder Mr. Jones, having had a better education than they, will in all probability make a greater scholar; and his brother is one of quick parts.

"Our Logic, which we have read once over, is so contrived as to comprehend all Heereboord, and the far grater part of Mr. Locke's Essay, and the Art of thinking. What Mr. Jones dictated to us was but short, containing a clear and brief account of the matter, references to the places where it was more fully treated of, and remarks on, or explications of the authors cited, when need required. At our next lecture we gave an account both of what the author quoted and our tutor said, who commonly then gave us a larger explication of it, and so proceeded to the next thing in order. He took care, as far as possible, that we understood the sense as well as remembered the words of what we had read, and that we should not suffer ourselves to be cheated with obscure terms which had no meaning. Though he be no greater admirer of the old Logic, yet he has taken a great deal of pains both in explaining and correcting Heereboord, and has for the most part made him intelligible, or shewn that he is not so.

"The two Mr. Jones's, Mr. Francis, Mr. Watkins, Mr. Sheldon, and two more gentlemen are to begin Jewish Antiquities in a short time. I was designed for one of their number, but rather chose to read Logic once more; both because I was utterly unacquainted with it when I came to this place, and because the others having all, except Mr. Francis, been at other academies will be obliged to make rather more haste than those in a lower class, and consequently cannot have so god or large accounts of any thing, nor so much time to study every head. We shall have gone through our course in about four years time, which I believe nobody that once known Mr. Jones will think too long.

"I began to learn Hebrew as soon as I came hither, and find myself able now to construe, and give some grammatical account of about twenty verses in the easier parts of the Bible after less than an hour's preparation. We read every day two verses a-piece in the Hebrew Bible which we turn into Greek (no one knowing which his verse shall be, though at first it was otherwise). And this with Logic is our morning's work.

"Mr. Jones also began about three months ago some Critical lectures in order to the exposition you advised him to. The principal things contained in them are about the Antiquity of the Hebrew Language, Letters, Vowels, the Incorruption of the Scriptures, ancient Divisions of the Bible, an account of the Talmud, Masora, and Cabala. We are at present upon the Septuagint, and shall proceed after that to the Targumim, and other versions, &c. Every part is managed with abundance of perspicuity, and seldom any material thing is omitted that other authors have said upon the point, though very frequently we have useful additions of things which are not to be found in them. We have scarce been upon any thing yet but Mr. Jones has had those writers which are most valued on that head, to which he always refers us. This is what we first set about in the afternoon; which being finished we read a chapter in the Greek Testament, and after that Mathematics. We have gone through all that is commonly taught of Algebra and Proportion, with the six first books of Euclid, which is all Mr. Jones designs for the gentlemen I mentioned above, but he intends to read something more to the class that comes after them.

"This is our daily employment, which in the morning takes up about two hours, and something more in the afternoon. Only on Wednesdays in the mornings we read Dionysius's Periegesis, on which we have notes mostly geographical, but with some criticisms intermixed; and in the afternoon we have no lecture at all. So on Saturday in the afternoon we have only a thesis, which none but they who have done with Logic have any concern in. We are also just beginning to read Isocrates and Terence each twice a week. On the latter our tutor will give us some notes which he received in a college from Perizonius.

"We are obliged to rise at five of the clock every morning, and to speak Latin always, except when below stairs amongst the family. The people where we live are very civil, and the greatest inconvenience we suffer is, that we fill the house rather too much, being sixteen in number besides Mr. Jones. But I suppose the increase of his academy will oblige him to remove next spring. We pass our time very agreeably betwixt study and conversation with our tutor, who is always ready to discourse freely of any thing that is useful, and allows us either then or at lecture all imaginable liberty of making objections against his opinion, and prosecuting them as far as we can. In this and every thing else he shows himself so much a gentleman, and manifests so great an affection and tenderness for his pupils, as cannot but command respect and love. I almost forgot to mention our tutor's library which is composed for the most part of foreign books, which seem to be very well chosen, and are every day of great advantage to us."
