= Rees David =

Early Arminian Baptist

Rees David (1683? - 1748) was an 18th-century Welsh schoolmaster, early Arminian Baptist, and writer of theological works. He was the son of a well-to-do farmer of the Caerphilly district who was a member of the Baptist church at Hengoed. He was a student of Samuel Jones (academy tutor). One of his schools was in or near Newcastle Emlyn (he was one of the signatories of a letter sent to Rhydwilym church from Llandysul in 1725), but when, in 1729 he adopted Arminian views, he moved his school to Hengoed, Glamorganshire. Later (about 1730), however, he became involved with doctrinal disputes at Hengoed. In particular, he was known for his disputation with another minister concerning infant baptism, and his publications on the subject. David refused to compromise, and turning his back both on Hengoed and on the Baptist denomination, instead made his living as an inn-keeper in Brecknock. He died on 26 May 1748.
