= Jeremiah Jones (tutor) =

Independent minister and biblical scholar

Jeremiah Jones (1693–1724) was an independent tutor and biblical critic.

== Youth ==
He was born in Wales in 1693. His father was David Jones of Llangollen, who married Maria, eldest daughter of Samuel Jones (1628–1697) at Swansea on 15 August 1687. In 1696 David Jones became pastor of the independent congregation at Shrewsbury, where he died in 1718.

Jeremiah Jones was educated by his uncle, Samuel Jones (1680–1719), at Gloucester (where in 1711 he was a fellow-student with Thomas Secker) and then at Tewkesbury Academy, to which Samuel Jones had moved the academy early in summer 1713.

== Career ==
His first settlement was as minister of the independent congregations at Market Harborough, Leicestershire, and Cold Ashby, Northamptonshire. In 1719 he succeeded George Fownes as minister of the independent congregation at Nailsworth in the parish of Avening, Gloucestershire, and at the same time took charge of his deceased uncle's students, and removed them from Tewkesbury. However, the academy soon declined in size and reputation: between 1719 and 1722 only four students were sent to him by the presbyterian board. Nevertheless, his popularity as a preacher was shown by the enlargement of his meeting-house, and by the attendance of persons of station. His character as a scholar made him known beyond his own denomination. A hard student, he was of social disposition, and took pleasure in playing bowls. He died prematurely in 1724.

== Legacy ==
Jones is best remembered for his admirable investigation of the grounds for attributing canonicity to the received books of the New Testament, to the exclusion of others. His treatise on this subject was long unique, and for its time exhaustive. Though now superseded in details, its breadth of treatment and fulness of materials render it still valuable. It was entitled A New and Full Method of Settling the Canonical Authority of the New Testament and was left ready for the press at his death. A third volume, published in 1727, contains the special application of his method to the Gospels and Acts, with a reprint of an earlier publication. His earlier publication, A Vindication of the Former Part of St. Matthew's Gospel (1719), dedicated to his uncle, is a criticism of William Whiston's endeavour to reconcile the chronology of the evangelists by a theory of ‘dislocations’ in the existing Gospel of Matthew. It would appear from the preface that Jones had been in correspondence with Whiston. Jones is said to have projected another volume ‘on the apostolical fathers;’ more probably he meant to apply his method of determining canonicity to the remaining books of the New Testament.
