= Joseph Nicol Scott =

English physician, dissenting minister and writer

Joseph Nicol Scott M.D. (1703?–1769) was an English physician, dissenting minister and writer.

== Life ==
He was the eldest son of Thomas Scott, an Independent minister at Hitchin and then Norwich, the half-brother of Daniel Scott, and was born about 1703 at Hitchin in Hertfordshire; Thomas Scott was his brother, and Elizabeth Scott his sister. He acted as his father's assistant at the Old Meeting in Norwich from about 1725, but his religious views became Arian, and he was dismissed in 1737 or 1738.

Scott was then established by his Norwich friends in a Sunday lectureship at the French church, St Mary the Less. At first he drew good audiences, including members of the Church of England, but his lectures were discontinued by 1743.

Scott studied medicine at Edinburgh, and graduated M.D. in 1744. For some years he practised in Norwich. John Reynolds, an admirer, left him an estate at Felsted in Essex.

He died at Felsted on 23 December 1769. A monument to his memory was in the Old Meeting, Norwich. The Gracious Warning, a monody on his death, by George Wright, was published in 1774.

== Works ==
Scott published:

- Sermons … in defence of all Religion … Natural or Revealed, 1743, 2 vols. One is on "the Mahometan Revelation considered", and others affirm annihilationism, anticipating the position of Samuel Bourn (1714–1796).
- An Essay towards a Translation of Homer's Works in Blank Verse, with Notes, 1755, a version of thirteen passages from the Iliad.

He also revised the etymologies from classic and oriental languages for an issue (1755, folio) of the English Dictionary by Nathan Bailey.

== Family ==
Scott's widow, Martha Bell, died at Aylsham, Norfolk, in 1799, aged 87.

== Notes ==
Attribution

This article incorporates text from a publication now in the public domain: Lee, Sidney, ed. (1897). "Scott, Joseph Nicoll". Dictionary of National Biography. Vol. 51. London: Smith, Elder & Co.
