= Awake, our drowsy souls =

Christian hymn by Elizabeth Scott

- Christian hymn
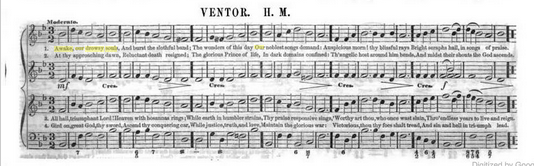
- sheet music
- Written: 1769
- Text: Elizabeth Scott
- Meter: 6.1
- Published: Baptist Collections of Ash and Evans, Bristol, 1769, No. 307, in 5 stanzas of 6 1.

"Awake, our drowsy souls" was a Christian hymn by Elizabeth Scott.

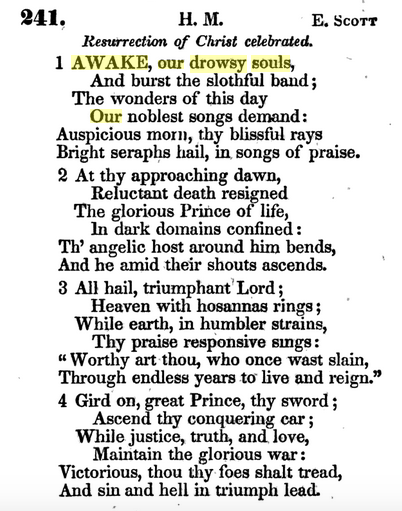
Lyrics for "Awake, our drowsy souls" (1769), by Elizabeth Scott

== History ==
It was first published in the Baptist Collections of Ash and Evans, Bristol, 1769, No. 307, in 5 stanzas of 6 1., and appointed as "A hymn for Lord's Day Morning." From that collection it passed into several later hymnals, including John Rippon, John Dobell, and others. By the early 20th-century, it was almost entirely unknown to modern hymn-books except in the United States, having been superseded by "Awake, ye saints, awake, And hail", and others as a recast of the same in 4 stanzas (stanza iii. being the original with "and" for "while," 1. 3) made by Thomas Cotterill, and given in the first edition of his Selection, 1810. This form of the hymn had somewhat extensive use in Great Britain and the U.S., and is usually ascribed correctly to "Elizabeth Scott and Thomas Cotterill."

== Alternate versions ==
In many of the modern American hymnals, stanza iv. is omitted; but the English generally give the text from Cotterill as in Baptist Psalms and Hymns, 1858. In this case, the only alteration is "blest " for "bless'd " in stanza i., line 5. Another form of the hymn is:— "Servants of God, awake." It consists of st. i.—iii- of Cotterill's recast, slightly altered. It appeared in the Harrow School Hymn Book, 1855, and from then on passed into Church Hymns, 1871, No. 39. In the Hymn-Book of the Evangelical Association, Cleveland, Ohio, 1881, No. 604, stanzas i., ii. are given as "Children of God, awake "; and in the Marlborough College Hymns, 1869, stanzas i.—iii. as " Come, sons of God, awake."

The authorship of "Awake, ye saints, awake" is ascribed to Cotterill, on the ground that he wrote the most of what is its present form. In Caleb Evans's Collection, fifth edition, 1786, it appears in five stanzas, commencing, “Awake, our drowsy souls." Rippon has it with the same text and the same title: “A Hymn for the Lord’s Day Morning." Evans credits it to “D,” that is, Dr. Philip Doddridge, but Dobell, who reprints it in six stanzas, has assigned it to “Scott”. It was altered about the year 1810 by Cotterill, for his Sheffield collection. The original was discovered in manuscript, in the library of Yale College, where it remained. Professor Frederic Mayer Bird gave much care to Scott's biography and hymns, and elaborately annotated this manuscript volume in the columns of the New York Independent.
