= Samuel Jones (academy tutor) =

English Dissenter and tutor

Samuel Jones (1681/2 – 11 October 1719) was an English Dissenter and educator, known for founding a significant Dissenting academy at Tewkesbury.

== Early life ==
He was the son of Malachi Jones (died 1729), a dissenting preacher from Herefordshire, who left England for America ca. 1711. His education took place at the dissenting academy in Abergavenny, Monmouthshire, run by Roger Griffiths, who shortly afterwards conformed to the Church of England. Jones then went to study with James Owen (died 1706) at Shrewsbury Academy. He was funded from February 1704 by a generous grant from the Congregational Fund Board (founded 1695), who later examined him as a candidate for the ministry. However, instead of taking up a position as a dissenting minister, he went to study at the University of Leiden, being there from 7 August 1706; here he encountered the teachings of Jacobus Gronovius, Jacobus Perizonius, and Hermanus Witsius. His notes on their lectures influenced his own systems of divinity and philosophy, which he used during his own teaching.

== Creation of the academy ==
After finishing his education at Leiden, Jones moved to Gloucester, opening his dissenting academy in the Presbyterian Henry Wintle's house in Barton Street. From the outset, the Academy was popular; over its short existence, it was to educate around one hundred students, mostly for the dissenting ministries, making it the largest academy of its type in the south of England; Jones's learning in Jewish antiquities and reformed theology encouraged students from across the country to attend his lectures. But this happened in the face of state persecution. Under the 1662 Act of Uniformity, all schools and academies needed to be licensed by the local bishop, a situation which was not repealed (or even subjected to immunity from prosecution) by the Act of Toleration 1689. In September 1712, Jones was presented at the ecclesiastical court under the 1662 Act of Uniformity for keeping a school or seminary which had not been licensed. One of the most serious charges was that he infiltrated 'seditious and antimonarchical principles' into his students. In the light of comments made by his students such as Thomas Mole, it seems unlikely that Jones's establishment was through-and-through 'prejudicial to the present Establishment.' These students included future conformists of great eminence, including Joseph Butler and Thomas Secker (later Archbishop of Canterbury), as well as major dissenting theologians and controversialists, including Rees David and Samuel Chandler.

== At Tewkesbury ==
Jones moved the academy to Tewkesbury early in summer 1713, at least partly to move to a bigger house; one of his students, possibly Secker, lent him £200 to enable his move; he repaid it over several years. Persecution of the Academy continued, however; following the Henry Sacheverell affair and the attempted passing of Schism bills in parliament, Jones's house was attacked by rioters on 20 October 1714, the day of the coronation of George I. This local hostility reflects the merger of popular politics and anti-academy state propaganda during Queen Anne's rule.

The academy soon faced new problems. After moving to Tewkesbury, Jones became an increasingly heavy drinker and his teaching declined in quality and success. He died at Tewkesbury on 11 October 1719 aged thirty-seven, and was buried in Tewkesbury Abbey. He had married Judith Weaver (who died in 1746) shortly before his death; she was a noted correspondent who later married Edward Godwin, a former student; they were to become grandparents of the radical philosopher and theologian William Godwin, husband and biographer of the philosopher Mary Wollstonecraft. They were the parents of the writer Mary Shelley.

Jones was succeeded at the academy by his nephew, Jeremiah Jones (1693–1724), who removed it to Nailsworth. However, it soon declined in size and reputation.

== Posthumous reputation ==
If anything, Jones's reputation grew after his death. Andrew Kippis, minister of Newington Green Unitarian Church, wrote in his biography of Joseph Butler in the Biographia Britannica that Jones was 'a man of uncommon abilities' and 'erudition', with a 'high and deserved reputation.' He believed that Jones paid great attention to his students' 'morals' and 'progress in literature', directing their studies with 'skill and discernment.' Of Samuel Chandler's education, he commented that he had 'a singular advantage' to be placed under 'so able and accomplished a tutor.'

Thomas Secker, who lived with Jones as one of his students, wrote to Isaac Watts, who had encouraged him to study there, that his teacher was "a man of real piety, great learning, and an agreeable temper; one who is very diligent in instructing all under his care, very well qualified to give instructions, and whose well-managed familiarity will always make him respected. He is very strict in keeping good orders, and will effectually preserve his pupils from negligence and immorality." Secker was well placed to discriminate, judging his previous school, Timothy Jollie's dissenting academy at Attercliffe, quite harshly: frustrated by Jollie's poor teaching, he famously remarked that he lost his knowledge of languages and that 'only the old Philosophy of the Schools was taught there: and that neither ably nor diligently. The morals also of many of the young Men were bad. I spent my time there idly & ill'.

== Jones's works ==
Although Jones published nothing, his manuscript systems of learning influenced the next generation of dissenting academics, including the tutor Philip Doddridge of Northampton. The following manuscript works are known and extant:

- Samuelis Jonesii, Academiae inter Fratres Dissentientes Archididascali, in Godwini Mosen & Aaronem, Annotationes; in Duos Tomos divisiae. [2 vols.]
- Prolegomena Critica sive Apparatus ad S. Scripturae Lectiones
- Notae Gronovii et viri clarissimi [2 vols.]
- Elementa Mathematica
- Praelectiones S. Jones in Godwini
- Logica, sive ars ratiocinandi, errores Burgersdicii, et Heereboordii investigems, patefacieus, & emendans
- In Dionysii Orbis Descriptionem Notae Quaedam, 1713
