= Elizabeth Scott (hymnwriter) =

British-born American poet and hymnwriter

Elizabeth Scott Williams Smith
- Born: Elizabeth Scott; 1708; Norwich, England
- Died: June 13, 1776 (aged 67–68); Wethersfield, Connecticut, U.S.
- Resting place: Village Cemetery, Wethersfield
- Occupations: Poet, hymnwriter
- Spouse(s): Elisha Williams (m. 1751; died 1755); William Smith (m. 1761; died 1769)
- Relatives: Thomas Scott and Joseph Nicol Scott (brothers); Daniel Scott (uncle)
- Writing career
- Language: English
- Genre: Hymns
- Subject: Christianity
- Notable works: "All hail, Incarnate God"; "Awake, our drowsy souls"

Elizabeth Scott Williams Smith (née, Scott; after first marriage, Williams; after second marriage, Smith; 1708 – June 13, 1776) was an 18th-century British-born American poet and hymnwriter. Prior to 1750, she wrote many hymns with the largest of her known manuscript collections containing 90 of these. The first publication of her hymns was in The Christian's Magazine, edited by William Dodd, 1763. Nineteen of her hymns were given in John Ash and Caleb Evans' Baptist Collection, Bristol, 1769, and twenty in John Dobell's New Selection, 1806. Of these, one of the best known is "All hail, Incarnate God". Smith died in 1776.

== Early life ==
Elizabeth Scott was born at Norwich, (Note: In Dictionary of National Biography, 1885-1900, Volume 51 by Alexander Gordon, there is an entry for her brother, Thomas Scott, and here it is noted that Elizabeth was born in Hitchin.) England, probably in 1708. Her father was Thomas Scott (1680-1746), an independent, dissenting minister of that city. A brother Thomas, was likewise a hymnwriter, while another brother, Joseph Nicol Scott, was a physician, dissenting minister and writer. Her father's brother, Daniel Scott, was a lexicographer.

Her father wrote of her (1 March 1740) as 'one who devotes herself to doing good, as a Protestant nun.' Her letter to Doddridge, 10 May 1745, shows that she was suffering from religious depression, not unconnected with family troubles (Humphreys, Correspondence of Philip Doddridge, iii. 424, iv. 408 sq.).

== Career ==
She began writing hymns at her father's suggestion. They were not published until 1740 at least, and perhaps not until much later. Some were in Dr. Dodd's Christian Magazine, 1763. In Dr. Dodd's Christian Magazine for 1764, there are a few hymns by her. "All hail, incarnate God! ", No. 412, is listed as hymn No. 386 in Dobell's Collection, of 1806, where it has the name "Scott." The second verse beginning—"To Thee the hoary head," has this note—" Composed on seeing an Aged Saint and a Youth taken into Church communion together." Twenty-one were in Ash and Evans's Collection, 1769; and eight of these, with twelve new ones, in Dobell's Selection, 1806.

In a manuscript in the library of Yale College, Franklin Bowditch Dexter tabulated the hymns. He said (January 29, 1889):— "The label on the back of this volume is Hymns & Poems by Eliz. Scott. There is no title to the manuscript pages. Prefixed to the Hymns and Poems there is, however, a long and very tenderly written dedication (in prose) 'To my much Rever'd, much Lov'd, Father', this signed 'E. S.' and dated 1740. Then follows (without numbers) the Hymns with titles and first lines. Dexter added the first lines and the titles of 90 hymns.

In a second manuscript headed "Poems on Several Occasions by Miss Scott of Norwich, who married to Mr. Williams of New England, January 1750/1." there follow 26 hymns in full. At the end, this is written, "These transcribed from Maj. Williams' Manuscript, Feb. 27, 1751, the week before she left Norwich to go to New England." The whole of these 26 hymns are in Yale College.

A third manuscript contains eight hymns which are prefaced with these words,— "Copied from a book of Mrs. Bury's, written by her Aunt Miss Elizabeth Scott, afterwards Mrs. Williamson." Of these hymns, six are in the Yale College and 2 not therein, viz.:—(1) "Arise and hail the happy [sacred] day" (p. 78, 1.). and "Hail, King supreme, all wise and good", both of which are given anonymously in the Unitarian Acu» CW. of Ps. for the Vie of a Cong, of Protatant Dissenters in Liverpool, commonly known as The Liverpool Liturgy, pub. in 1763. Concerning the authorship of these two hymns there is great doubt.

In Dr. Dodd's Christian's Magazine for December 1763, a writer signs himself "CL—T." He had at that time a manuscript of Scott's hymns with a Dedication to her father prefixed thereto and signed "Eliz Sc—tt." From this manuscript, he sent "Why droops my soul with guilt oppressed" (Christ, the Great Physician) to the December number of the magazine; "Evil and few our mortal days" (Vanity of human Life), to the February number, 1764, and "What finite power with ceaseless toil ("Praise for Temporal Blessings"), to the April number of the same year. At the close of the last hymn, he said in a note—"N.B. "As some of your Correspondents have sent you some pieces out of the same collection, from which these are transcribed, that I have undertaken to send you (e.g. that on Gen. xvii. l) it were to be wished, if they should do the like again, that they would signify whose they are." The hymn referred to in this note was, "Great God, Thy penetrating eye" (God pervading all things), which appeared in the January number of the Christian Magazine, 1784, without signature or acknowledgement of any kind. All these hymns are in the Yale College manuscript.

From these facts, it is clear that before departing for the United States, Scott allowed copies of her hymns to be made from her manuscripts, and it was mainly from these copies that those of her hymns composed before her marriage were printed in the English hymnbooks. None of those hymns date later than 1750. The collections in which they appeared, and through which they came into collections were the Bristol Baptist College of Ash and Evans, 1769, and the New Selections, by J. Dobb, 1806. In Ash and Evans there are 19 hymns, signed "S.," all of which are in the Yale College manuscript. under the same first lines except "Was it for man, apostate man'/" but this also may possibly be there under another first line. In Dobell, there are 20 hymns signed "Scott", of which 17 are in the Yale College manuscript, two are parts of hymns from Ash and Evans-, also in that manuscript are and "Sole Sovereign of the earth and skies," also probably in the manuscript under another first line. Of the 90 hymns in the Yale manuscript, in addition to those annotated elsewhere in Julian's Dictionary of Hymnology, there are also in collections:—

i. From Ash and Evans's Collection of Hymns, 1769.

- God of my life, to Thee belongs. On Recovery from Sickness.
- My God, shall I for ever mourn? Covenant-keeping God. From this "Shall e'er the shadow of a change?" is taken (st. iii.).
- When Abram full of sacred awe. For a Fast Day. Sometimes, "Thus Abram, full of sacred awe."
- Why, O my heart, these anxious cares? Submis-sion.

ii. From J. Dobell's New Selection, &c, 1806.

- Dare we indulge to wrath and strife? Against Wrath.
- Eternal Spirit, 'twas Thy breath. Whitsuntide.
- For ever shall my fainting soul. Against grieving the Holy Spirit. Sometimes "0 Lord, and shall our fainting souls?"
- Great God, Thy penetrating eye. God All and in All.
- The glitt'ring spangles of the sky. The Mercies of God.
- Thy bounties, gracious Lord. Offertory.
- Where'er the Lord shall build my house. Family Religion.

== Personal life ==
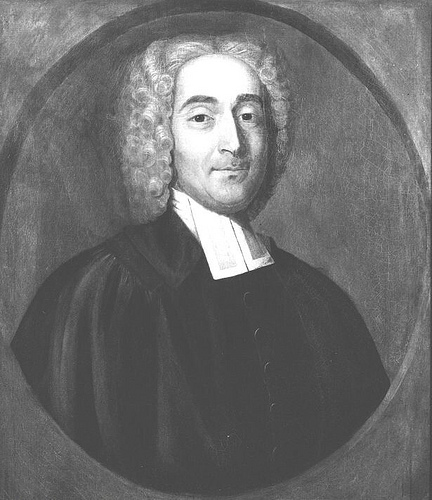
Elisha Williams

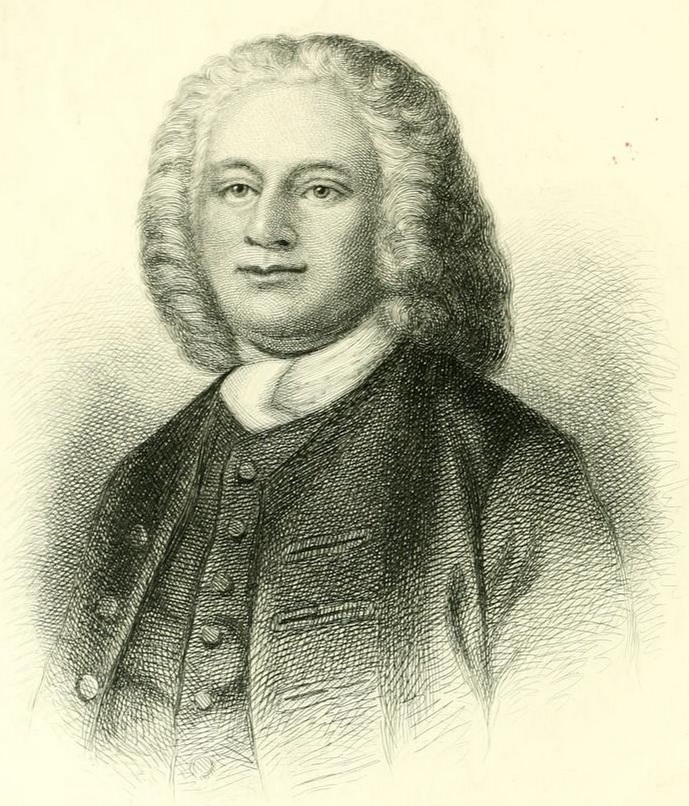
William Smith

Scott refused marriage to but retained the friendship of Doddridge, who made her acquainted with Colonel Elisha Williams (1694–1755), an American Congregational minister, who was, from 1726 to 1739, Rector of Yale College. She married him in 1751 in Norwich, emigrated with him to Wethersfield, Connecticut in March 1752, and survived him after his death, three years later.

On May 12, 1761, she married the Hon. William Smith, a prominent New York City jurist, whom she also survived. In 1769, when she was for the second time a widow, she returned to Wethersfield, residing at the home of Ezekiel Williams (1729-1818), Elisha's nephew.

She died in Wethersfield, on June 13, 1776, and was buried at Village Cemetery, of that city. Her entire poetical manuscripts are in the library of Yale College.

== Selected works ==
- Hymns & Poems By : Eliz Scott

Her letters are held at Yale University.

Her manuscripts are held at the British Library.
