= Infant Sorrow =

Poem by William Blake

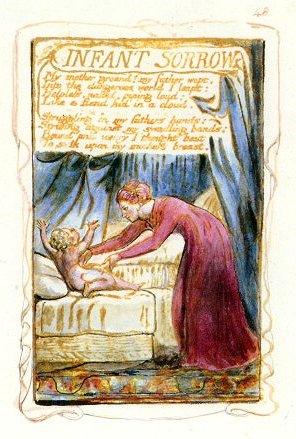
William Blake's original plate for Infant Sorrow

"Infant Sorrow" is a poem by William Blake from Songs of Experience.

== Background ==
This poem belongs to the Songs of Experience by William Blake. It is the counter poem of "Infant Joy". The poem suggests that childbirth is not always joyful and happy but can bring sorrow and pain. The response of the child itself may be different from that of the child in "Infant Joy" because of the behavior of the parents. In this poem the parents seem depressed by this unwanted birth, and this may be reflecting on the child itself.

This poem could be considered as a work of societal allusion. It is well known that William Blake was strongly opposed to the Industrial Revolution; similarly, he was opposed to the mistreatment of children by rich factory owners. When the infant is being brought helpless and naked to the "dangerous world", this world could refer to the industrial revolution. Blake utilizes this as a symbol of temporary security. While the child is young, it will be nurtured and protected by its parents. But once the child matures, it will find a life devoid of any joy or pleasure, such as working in the factories with no security. The child decides to "sulk" upon the breast of the child's mother, almost in a manner that allows the child to enjoy what little comfort it has left. This poem is powerful in the sense that it outlines the sometimes desperate, sorrowful situation facing children as they grow.

== Poem ==
My mother groand! my father wept.
Into the dangerous world I leapt:
Helpless, naked, piping loud;
Like a fiend hid in a cloud.

Struggling in my fathers hands:
Striving against my swaddling bands:
Bound and weary I thought best
To sulk upon my mothers breast.
