= Jeremiah Hunt =

Jeremiah Hunt, D.D. (London, 11 June 1678– 5 September 1744) was an independent minister.

== Life ==
Jeremiah Hunt was born as the only son of Thomas Hunt, a London merchant, on 11 June 1678. His father died in 1680, and his mother secured for him a liberal education. He studied first under Thomas Rowe, then at the Edinburgh University, and lastly at Leiden University (1699-1701), where Nathaniel Lardner was a fellow student. He owed much to John Milling (d. 16 June 1705), minister of the English presbyterian church at Leyden, and learned Hebrew language and literature of a rabbi from Lithuania, and therefore afterwards acquired the title "Rabbi Hunt." In Holland he was licensed to preach, and was one of three who officiated in turns to the English presbyterian congregation at Amsterdam. He always preached without notes, and his memory was so good that he could recall the language of an unwritten sermon fourteen years after its delivery. On his return to England he was for three years (1704-7) assistant to John Green, an ejected divine, who had formed an independent church at Tunstead, Norfolk. Here, according to Harmer, he was ordained.

Coming up to London in 1707, Hunt accepted a call to succeed Richard Wavel, an ejected divine who died on 19 December 1705, as pastor of the Independent congregation at Pinners' Hall, Old Broad Street. Here he renewed his acquaintance with Lardner, whose testimony to the breadth and depth of his learning is very emphatic. They were members of a ministers' club which met on Thursdays at Chew's coffee-house in Bow Lane. Hunt was accounted 'a rational preacher;' his matter was practical, his method expository, his style easy. His admirers admitted that 'he only pleases the discerning few.' How far he diverged from the traditional Calvinism of dissent is not clear. Isaac Watts says that some 'suspected him of Socinianising,' but unjustly. In 1719 he voted with the nonsubscribers at Salters' Hall, but took no part in the controversy. John Shute Barrington, first viscount Barrington, the leader of the nonsubscribers, joined his church. At Barrington's seat, Tofts in Essex, he was in the habit of meeting Anthony Collins On 31 May 1729 he was made D.D. by Edinburgh University. In 1730, though an independent, he was elected a trustee of Dr. Williams's Foundations. He took part in 1734-5 in a course of dissenting lectures against popery, his subject being penances and pilgrimages. He was also one of the disputants in certain 'conferences' held with Roman Catholics, on 7 and 13 February 1735, at the Bell Tavern, Nicholas Lane.

He died on 5 September 1744. He had been married with a distant relative of Lardner, who preached his funeral sermon at Pinners' Hall. Exactly three months later, his entire library was sold by a four-day auction at Paul's Coffee-house, in St. Paul's Churchyard. Hunt was succeeded as pastor at Pinner's Hall by James Foster.

== Publications ==
Lardner gives a list of eleven separate sermons by Hunt, published between 1716 and 1736; eight of them are funeral sermons. Apart from those, Hunt published also:

- Mutual Love recommended upon Christian Principles, 1728,
- An Essay towards explaining the History and Revelations of Scripture - Part I., 1734, (deals with Genesis; no other part published; appended is a 'Dissertation on the Fall of Man')
- Sermons, 1748, 4 vols. (posthumous, edited by George Benson)

== See also ==
- Thomas Bradbury
