= Frederic Mayer Bird =

American clergyman, educator, and hymnologist (1838–1908)

Frederic Mayer Bird (1838–1908) was an American clergyman, educator, and hymnologist born in Philadelphia, Pennsylvania to famed playwright and novelist Robert Montgomery Bird. He graduated from the University of Pennsylvania in 1857 and the Union Theological Seminary in 1860, and from 1860 to 1867 was a Lutheran minister. In 1868 he took orders in the Episcopal Church.

He edited some religious publications, and published The story of our Christianity (1893).

He also wrote A Pessimist; in Theory and Practice (1888) under the pen-name "Robert Timsol".

He also wrote and edited "Heroes and Martyrs of Christianity," published in 1897.

== See also ==
- List of University of Pennsylvania people
