= The Little Black Boy =

1789 poem by William Blake

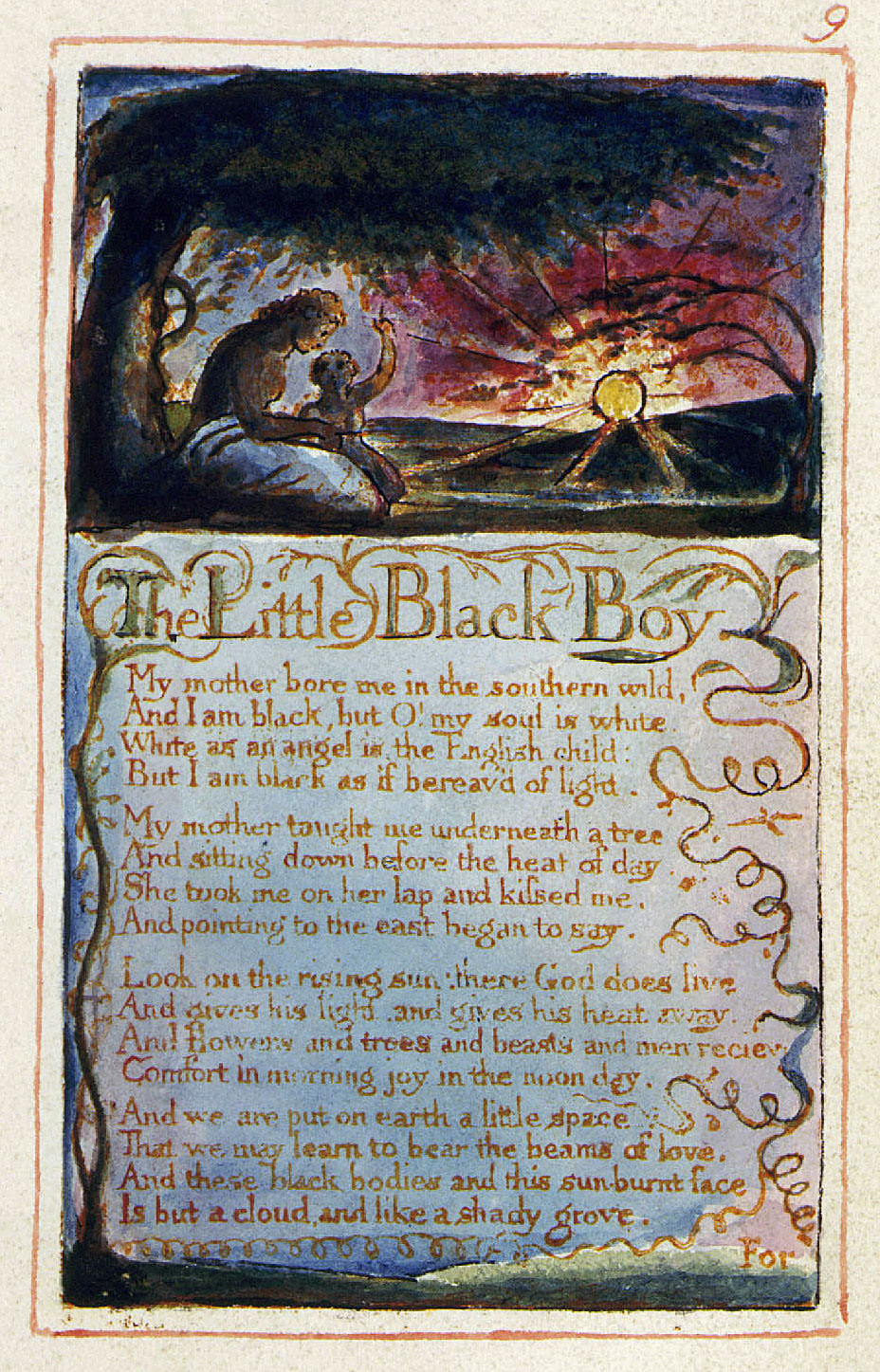
Blake's first plate of The Little Black Boy

"The Little Black Boy" is a poem by William Blake featured in his collection Songs of Innocence published in 1789. The work was published during a period when slavery was still legal and the campaign for the abolition of slavery was in its nascent stages.

== Poem ==
My mother bore me in the southern wild,
And I am black, but O! my soul is white;
White as an angel is the English child:
But I am black as if bereav'd of light.

My mother taught me underneath a tree
And sitting down before the heat of day,
She took me on her lap and kissed me,
And pointing to the east began to say.

Look on the rising sun: there God does live
And gives his light, and gives his heat away.
And flowers and trees and beasts and men receive
Comfort in morning joy in the noonday.

And we are put on earth a little space,
That we may learn to bear the beams of love,
And these black bodies and this sun-burnt face
Is but a cloud, and like a shady grove.

For when our souls have learn'd the heat to bear
The cloud will vanish we shall hear his voice.
Saying: come out from the grove my love & care,
And round my golden tent like lambs rejoice.

Thus did my mother say and kissed me,
And thus I say to little English boy.
When I from black and he from white cloud free,
And round the tent of God like lambs we joy:

Ill shade him from the heat till he can bear,
To lean in joy upon our fathers knee.
And then I'll stand and stroke his silver hair,
And be like him and he will then love me.

== Interpretation ==
Per the running metaphor of the sun, the fact that Blake speaks of "black bodies" and a "sunburnt face" in the fourth stanza seems to imply that black people are near God as a result of their suffering – for one can only become dark and sunburned as a result of being exposed to the sun's rays. In the final stanza, this idea is developed further, as the black boy says that he will "shade him [the English boy] from the heat", implying that the English boy's pale skin is not used to the heat (derived from God's love). Some critics assert that the paleness of the English boy in this poem is symbolic of the fact that the English were distanced from God as a result of their treatment of the black peoples.

In the 5th stanza, we see all of humanity being united:

For when our souls have learned the heat to bear,
The cloud will vanish...

In the 6th stanza, this metaphor is continued:

When I from black and he from white cloud free...

Here, Blake uses the clouds as a metaphor for the human body. These stanzas therefore imply that after physical life has passed, all will be united with God.

Also relevant to this poem is Blake's use of politically neutral colours such as gold and silver, in his other works, when describing things of moral value. The most valuable things in life, in terms of spirituality and wisdom, are anointed with colours that are indifferent to race and social class, yet are related to financial status, as gold and silver evoke images of precious metals.

== Gallery ==
Scholars agree that "The Little Black Boy" is the ninth object in the order of the original printings of the Songs of Innocence and Experience. The following represents a comparison of several of the extant original copies of the poem, their print date, their order in that particular printing of the poems, and their holding institution:

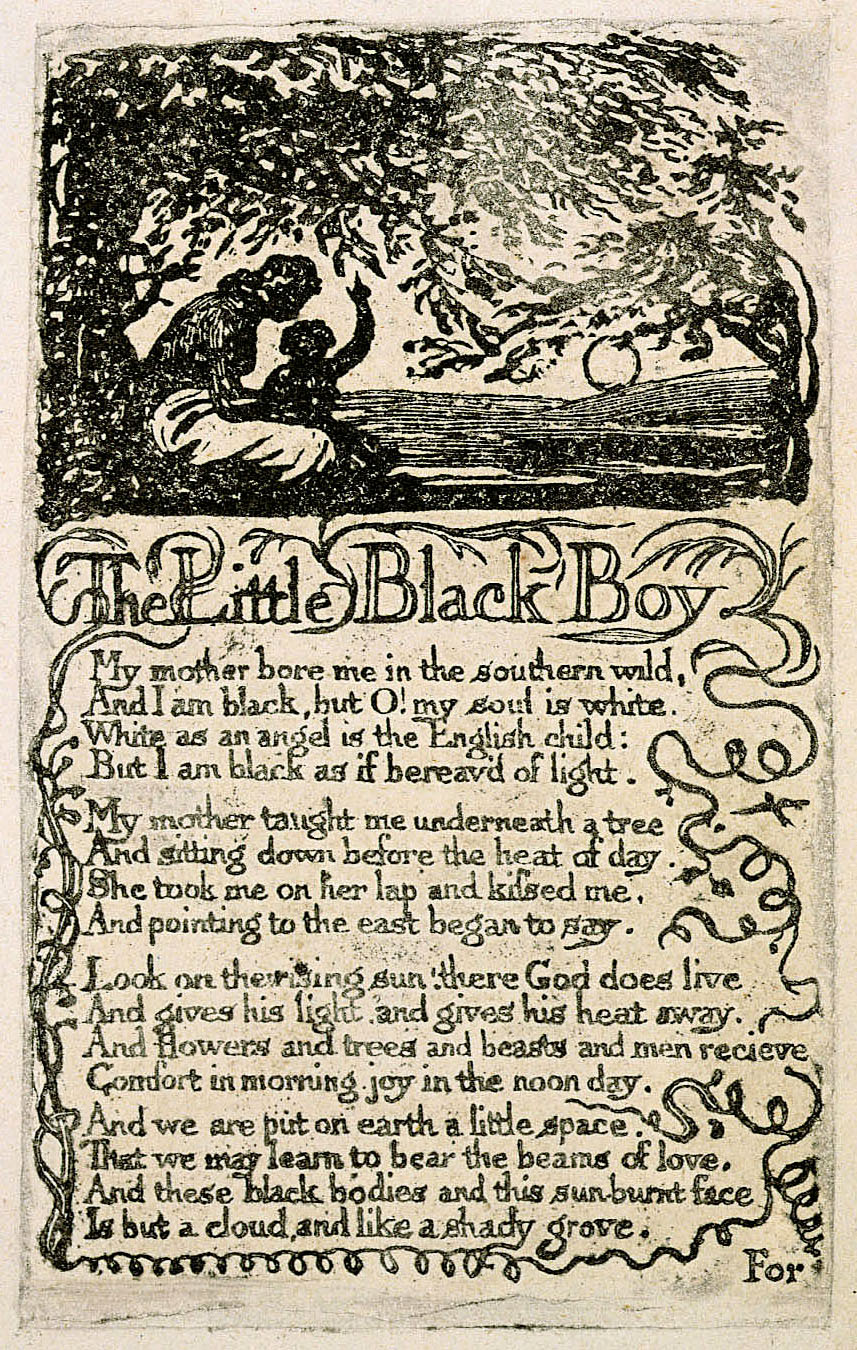
Songs of Innocence, copy U, 1789 (The Houghton Library) object 6 The Little Black Boy

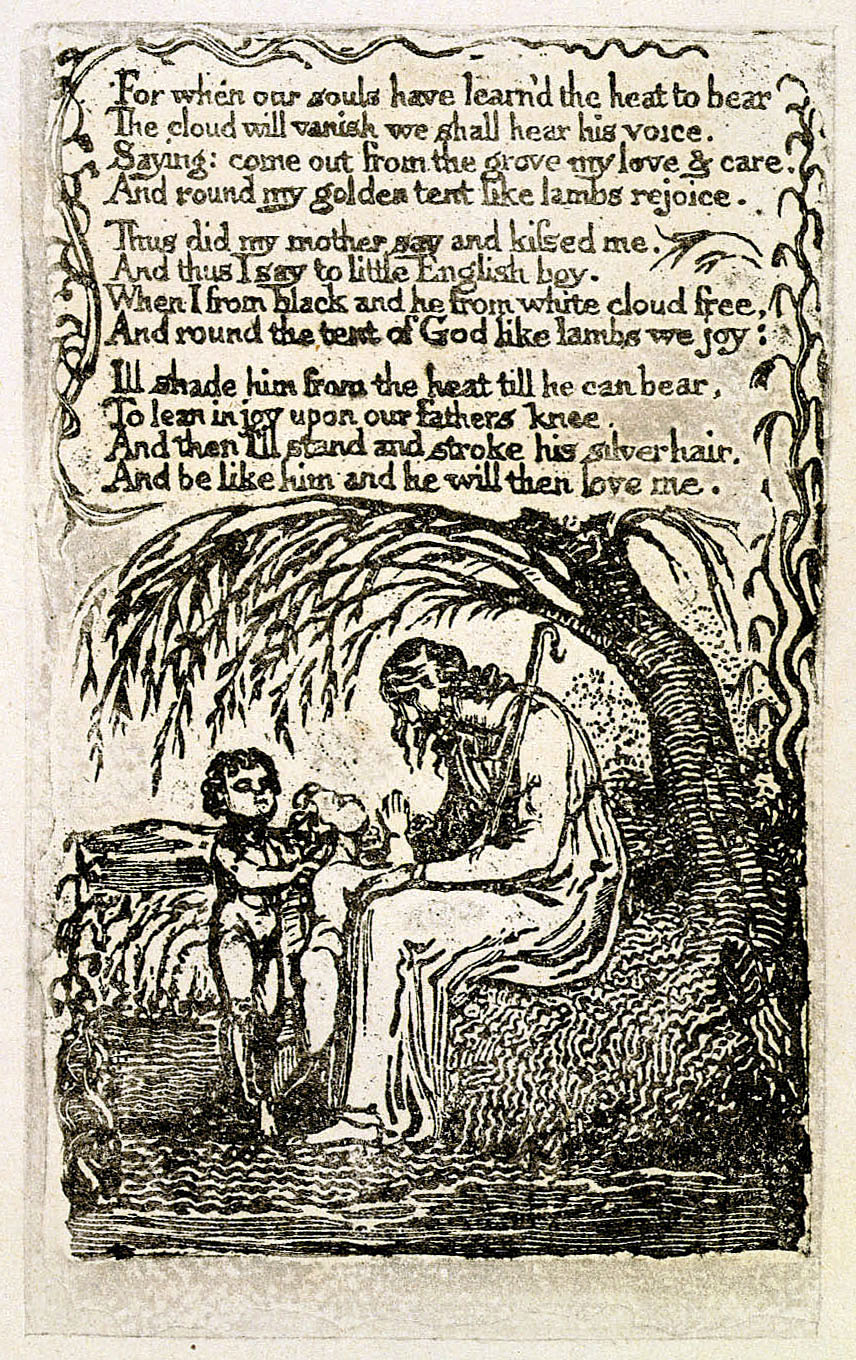
Songs of Innocence, copy U, 1789 (The Houghton Library) object 7 The Little Black Boy

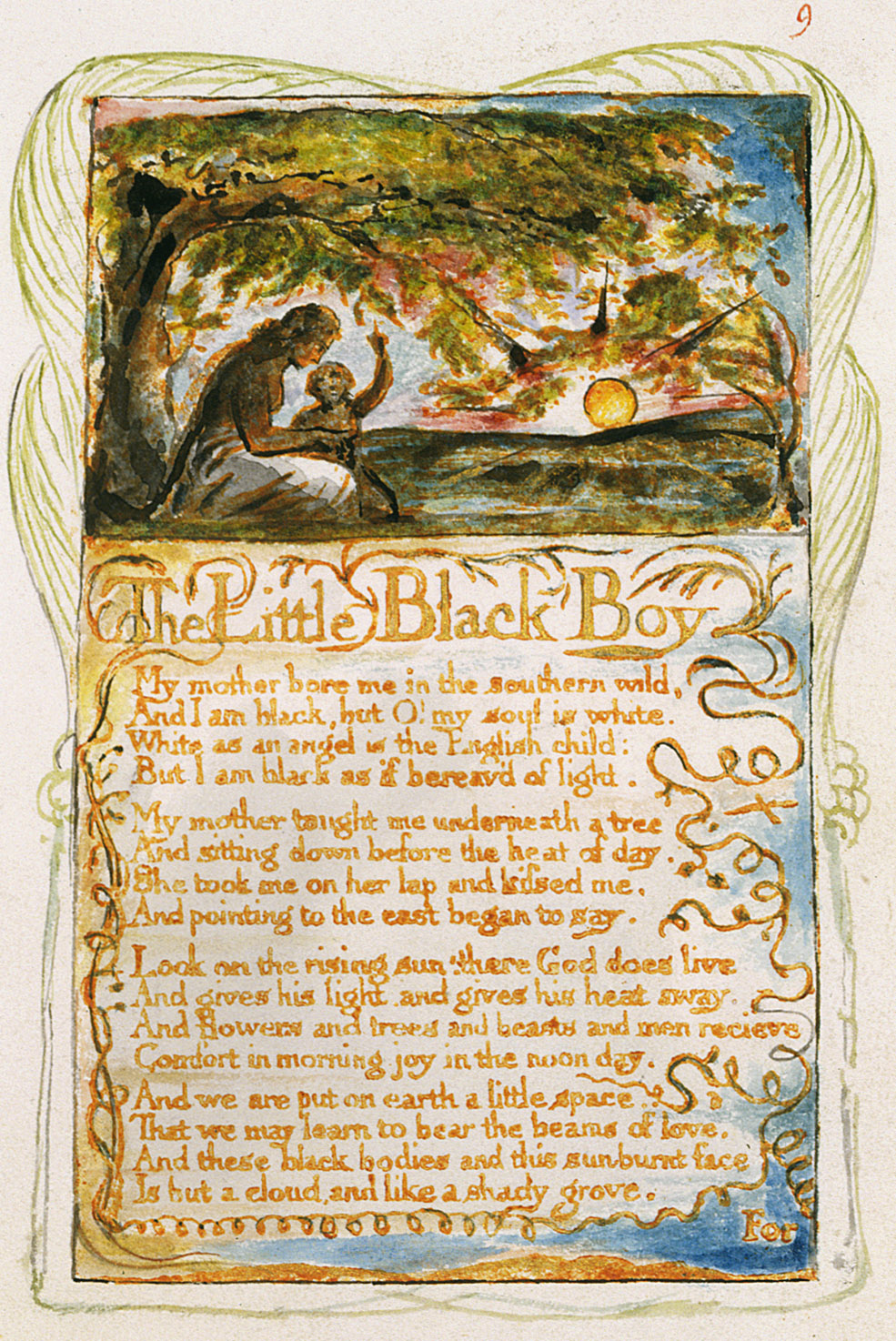
Songs of Innocence and of Experience, copy Y, 1825 (Metropolitan Museum of Art) object 9 The Little Black Boy

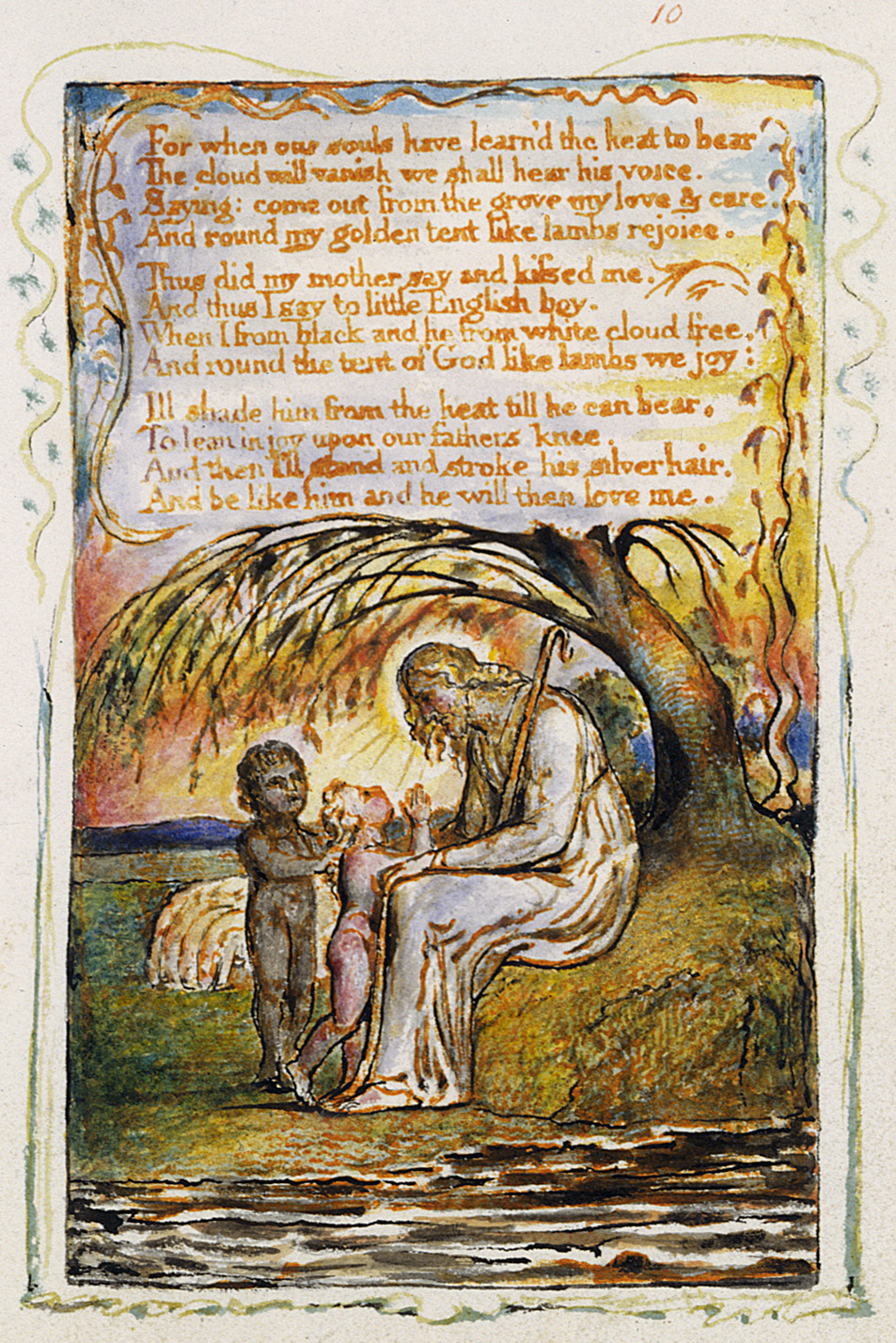
Songs of Innocence and of Experience, copy Y, 1825 (Metropolitan Museum of Art) object 10 The Little Black Boy

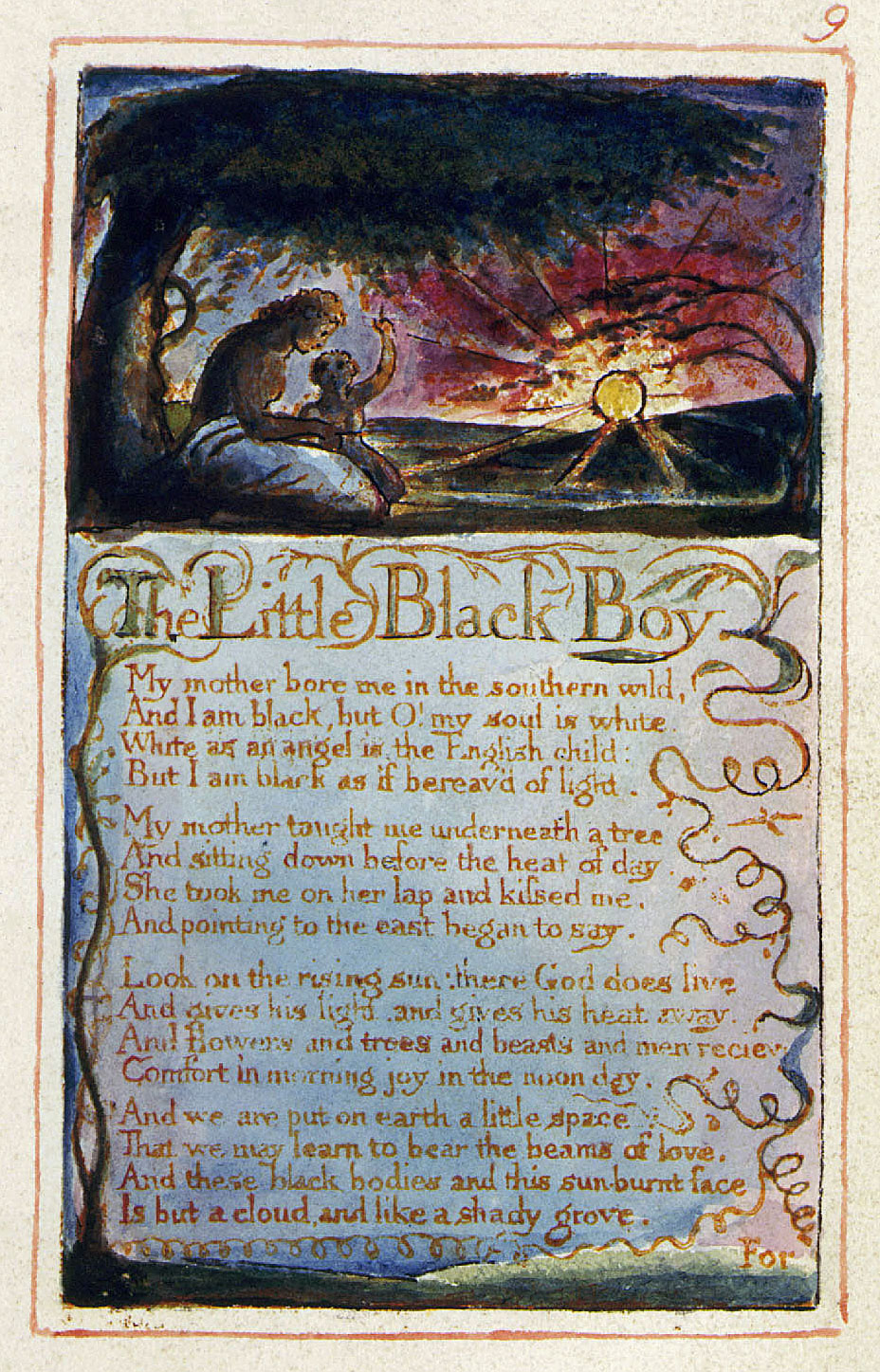
Songs of Innocence and of Experience, copy Z, 1826 (Library of Congress) object 9 The Little Black Boy

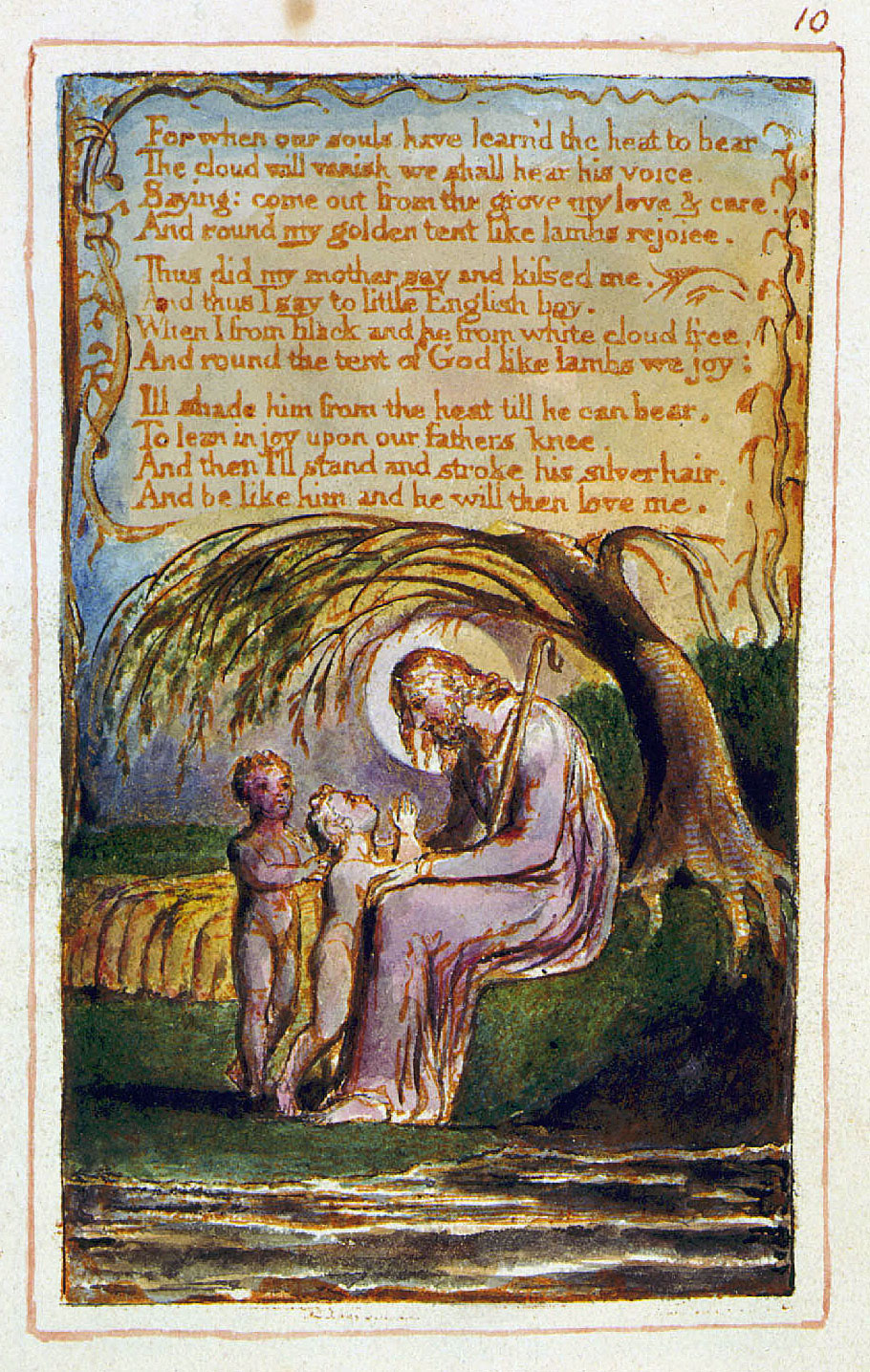
Songs of Innocence and of Experience, copy Z, 1826 (Library of Congress) object 10 The Little Black Boy

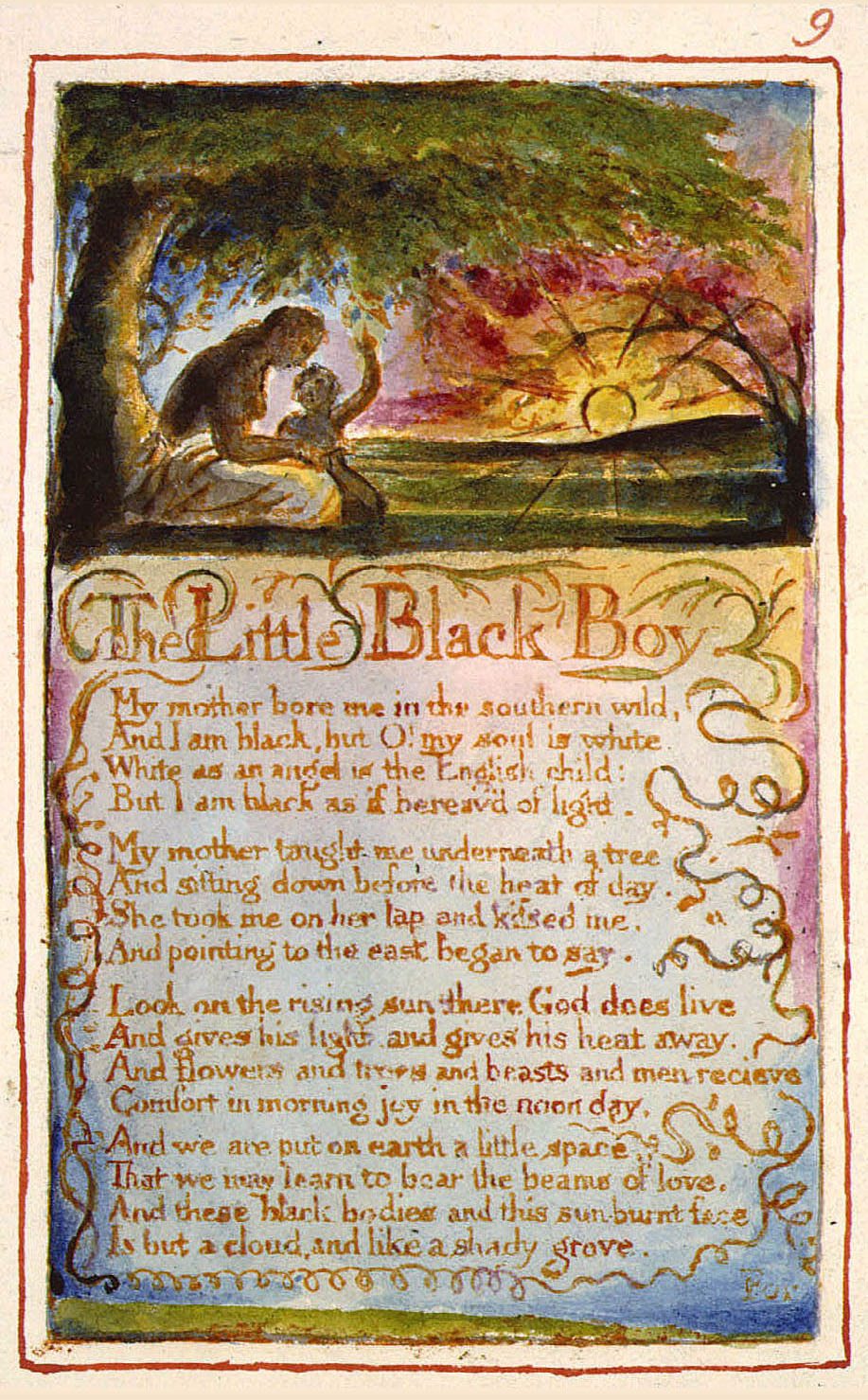
Songs of Innocence and of Experience, copy AA, 1826 (The Fitzwilliam Museum) object 9 The Little Black Boy

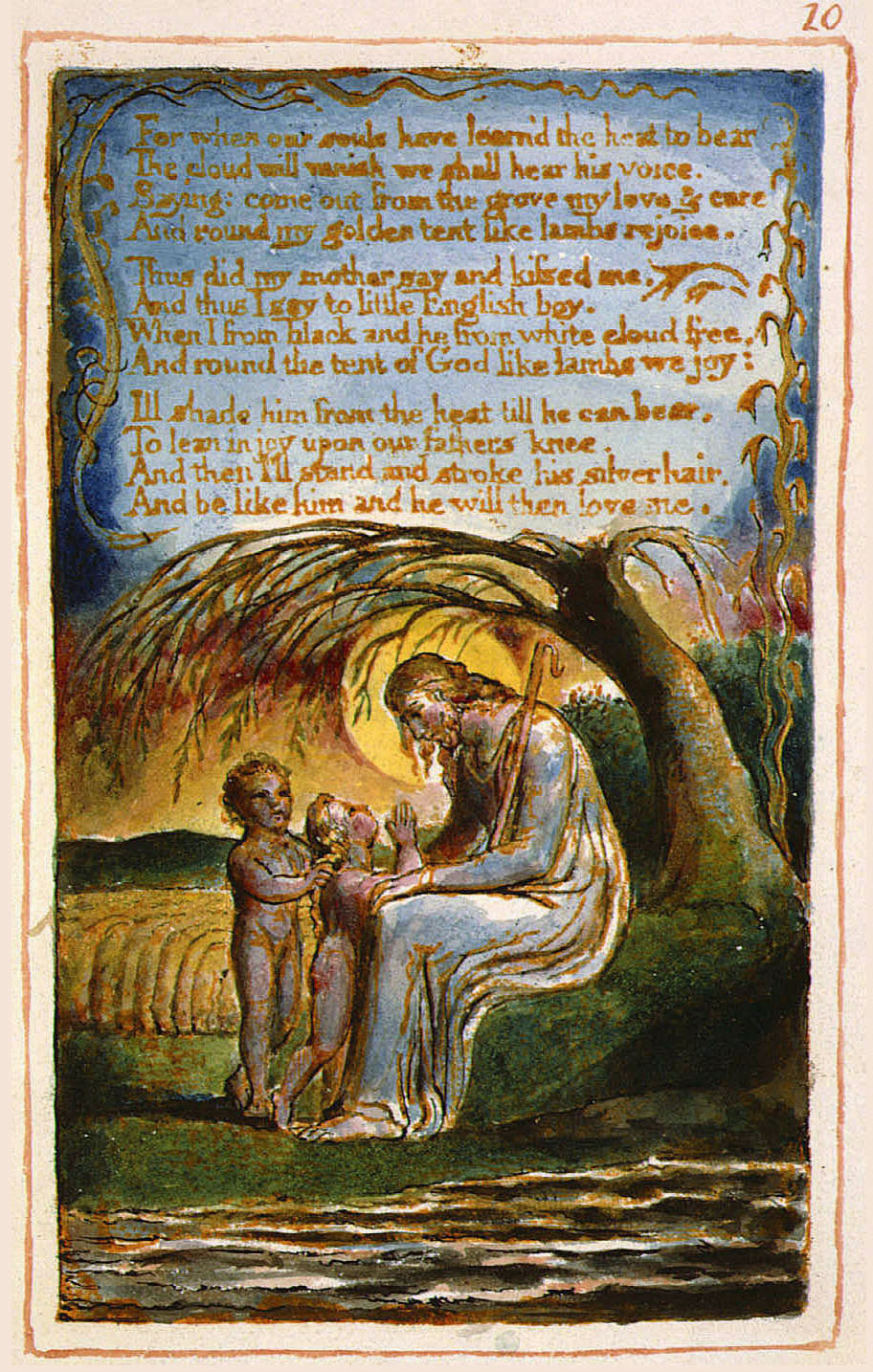
Songs of Innocence and of Experience, copy AA, 1826 (The Fitzwilliam Museum) object 10 The Little Black Boy
