= Wattisfield =

Village in Suffolk, England

Coordinates: 52.332°N 0.950°E

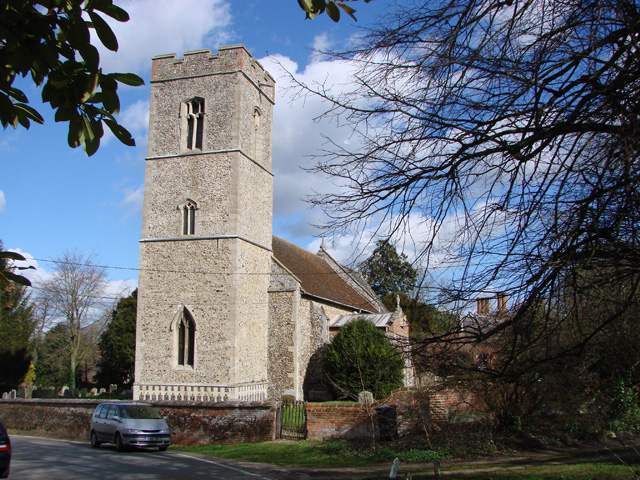
- St Margaret's church

- Location within Suffolk
- Population: 475 (2011)
- District: Mid Suffolk
- Shire county: Suffolk
- Region: East
- Country: England
- Sovereign state: United Kingdom
- Post town: Diss
- Postcode district: IP22
- Dialling code: 01359
- Police: Suffolk
- Fire: Suffolk
- Ambulance: East of England
- UK Parliament: Waveney Valley

Wattisfield is a village and civil parish in the Mid Suffolk district of Suffolk in eastern England. Located on the A143 around seven miles south-west of Diss, in 2005 its population was 440, increasing to 475 at the 2011 Census.

The village name in Domesday Book is Watesfelda, derived from the Old English meaning Wastel's clearing. It is situated in the ancient hundred of Blackbourne.

Its Grade II* listed medieval church is dedicated to St. Margaret.

Due to the abundant source of mica clay the village has a tradition of pottery making going back to the Bronze Age. A Romano-British or Anglo-Saxon cemetery was found in 1934 by Basil Brown, who later rose to fame for his discoveries at Sutton Hoo.

The village once had three licensed pubs but now it has none. The Royal Oak was part of Whitbread's pub estate but closed in 1968 and was sold on as a private dwelling, which it remains today (now split into two dwellings) directly opposite the church of St. Margaret's. The white post outside the building is a vestige of the old pub sign which used to hang from it. The White Swan was built in the 17th century and closed early 20th century; the building remains as a farmhouse to the north of the A143. The Black Swan closed in the 1920s but the building remains as a private dwelling on the south side of the A143 near its junction with Calkewood Lane.

A post-Medieval post mill stood near Manning's Lane; it was demolished circa 1965.

The Post Office and general store closed in 1997 and the building is now a home. What was once the village primary school, is now converted into three homes. Two dwellings now occupy what was the school play yard.

A stream which rises to the south of the village is called The Grundle and is one of the tributaries of the Little Ouse river which eventually joins the Great Ouse and discharges into The Wash.

== Wattisfield Hall ==
Atop a hill south-west of the village centre, Grade II* listed Wattisfield Hall is an early 17th century timber-framed manor house, most recognizable by its towering, octagonal, Tudor-brick chimneys––twelve in all, grouped into four large stacks.

=== Crusade against the art world ===
From 1967 to 1971, it was occupied as both a home and art restoration studio by famous art forger Tom Keating, and his business partner and lover, Jane Kelly. While running their picture cleaning and repair business, Keating secretly continued painting large numbers of Sexton Blakes––his rhyming slang for fakes––in the styles of Constable, Gainsborough, Rembrandt and many others, including the Samuel Palmer fakes that led to Kelly and him facing charges for art fraud at the Old Bailey in 1979.

In May 1977, Keating gave a national audience a tour of his former haunt, sharing fond memories of him and Kelly pretending to be Lord and Lady of the manor, in a BBC1 special called A Picture of Tom Keating: An exclusive study of a master forger.

=== Motocross ===
Several dates during the summer months see motocross scrambling action in the grounds of Wattisfield Hall.
