= Thomas Secker =

Archbishop of Canterbury from 1758 to 1768

The Most Reverend and Right Honourable Thomas Secker
- Archbishop of Canterbury
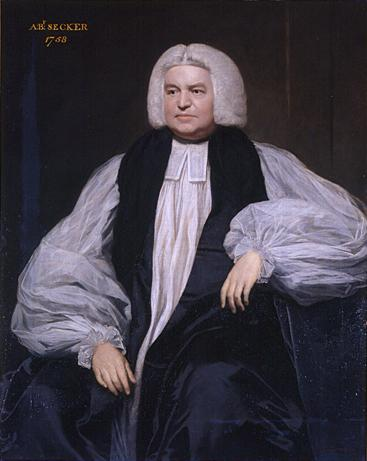
- Portrait by Joshua Reynolds
- Installed: 1758
- Term ended: 1768
- Predecessor: Matthew Hutton
- Successor: Frederick Cornwallis
- Other posts: Bishop of Bristol (1735–1737); Bishop of Oxford (1737–1758)

Personal details
- Born: 21 September 1693 Sibthorpe, Nottinghamshire
- Died: 3 August 1768 (aged 74) Lambeth Palace, London
- Buried: Lambeth
- Education: Leiden University; Exeter College, Oxford

Thomas Secker (21 September 1693 – 3 August 1768) was an archbishop of Canterbury in the Church of England.

== Early life and studies ==
Secker was born in Sibthorpe, Nottinghamshire. In 1699, he went to Richard Brown's free school in Chesterfield, Derbyshire, staying with his half-sister and her husband, Elizabeth and Richard Milnes. According to a story in the Gentleman's Magazine for 1768, Brown congratulated Secker for his successful studies by remarking, "If thou wouldst but come over to the Church, I am sure thou wouldst be a bishop." Under Brown's teaching, Secker believed that he had attained a competency in Greek and Latin.

He attended Timothy Jollie's dissenting academy at Attercliffe in Sheffield from 1708, but was frustrated by Jollie's poor teaching, famously remarking that he lost his knowledge of languages and that "only the old Philosophy of the Schools was taught there: and that neither ably nor diligently. The morals also of many of the young Men were bad. I spent my time there idly & ill". He left after one and a half years.

In 1710, he moved to London, staying in the house of the father of John Bowes, who had been one of Jollie's students and would one day become Lord Chancellor of Ireland. Whilst here, he studied geometry, conic sections, algebra, French, and John Locke's An Essay Concerning Human Understanding.

== Tewkesbury Academy and Samuel Jones ==
Also boarding at Bowes's house was Isaac Watts, who encouraged Secker to attend the dissenting academy in Gloucester set up by Samuel Jones. There Secker recovered his ability at languages, supplementing his understanding of Greek and Latin with studies in Hebrew, Chaldee and Syriac. Jones's course was also famous for his systems of Jewish antiquities and logic; maths was similarly studied to a higher than usual level.

Also at Jones's academy contemporaneously with Secker were the later Church of England bishops Joseph Butler and Isaac Maddox and also John Bowes; other members included the future dissenting leaders Samuel Chandler, Jeremiah Jones and Vavasour Griffiths. In 1713, Jones moved his academy to larger premises in Tewkesbury, partly financed by £200 from Secker. But Secker soon became involved with the clandestine correspondence between Butler and a Church of England cleric, Samuel Clarke, concerning Clarke's A Demonstration of the Being and Attributes of God (1705). Secker's role was to deliver Butler's letters personally to Gloucester post office and to pick up Clarke's replies. Meanwhile, Jones had acquired a reputation as a heavy drinker and the standard of his teaching may have decreased. Both Butler and Secker left his academy shortly afterwards, Butler in February 1714 and Secker in June of the same year.

He studied medicine in London and Paris before receiving the degree of MD from Leiden University in 1721. Upon his return to England, he entered Exeter College, Oxford and was ordained, by special letters, in 1722 from the Chancellor of Oxford University.

== Career ==
In 1724, he became rector of Houghton-le-Spring, Durham, resigning in 1727 on his appointment to the rectory of Holy Cross Church, Ryton, County Durham, and to a canonry of Durham. He became rector of St James's Westminster in 1733 and Bishop of Bristol in 1735. About this time George II commissioned him to arrange a reconciliation between the Prince of Wales and himself, but the attempt was unsuccessful.

In 1737, he became the bishop of Oxford and then the dean of St Paul's Cathedral, London, in 1750. On 21 April 1758, a month after the death of his predecessor, he became Archbishop of Canterbury.

His advocacy of an American episcopate, in connection with which he wrote the Answer to Jonathan Mayhew's Observations on the Charter and Conduct of the Society for the Propagation of the Gospel in Foreign Parts (London 1764), raised considerable opposition in England and America.

== Death, burial and legacy ==
Secker died at the age of 74 at 3 August 1768 in Lambeth Palace. Church records of the adjacent medieval parish church of St Mary-at-Lambeth have revealed that Secker had his viscera buried in a canister in the churchyard. Secker left a substantial bequest to Ann and Thomas Frost of Nottingham. After Secker died his will was disputed by Thomas Frost, and he managed to persuade the court that £11,000 intended by Secker for charity should be redirected to his family.

== Works ==
His principal work was Lectures on the Catechism of the Church of England (London, 1769).

A sermon preach'd before the University of Oxford, at St. Mary's, on Act Sunday in the afternoon, 1733, 1734
A sermon preached before the Right Honourable the Lord-Mayor, the Court of Aldermen, the sheriffs, and the governors of the several hospitals of the City of London [...], 1738
A sermon preached before the House of Lords, 1739
A sermon preached at King's Street chapel, in the parish of St James, 1741
A sermon preached before the Incorporated Society for the Propagation of the Gospel in Foreign Parts, 1741, 1752
A sermon preached in the parish-church of Christ-Church, London, 1743
A sermon preached on occasion of the present rebellion in Scotland, 1745
A sermon preached before the governors of the London Hospital, 1754
A sermon preached before the Society corresponding with Incorporated Society in Dublin, 1757
Nine sermons preached in the parish of St. James, Westminster, 1758, 1771
The recommendation of William Smith, A.M., 1759
An answer to Dr. Mayhew's Observations on the charter and conduct of the Society for the Propagation of the Gospel in Foreign Parts, 1764
Fourteen sermons preached on several occasions, 1766
A sermon preached in the parish-church of Christ-church, London, 1766
Eight charges delivered to the clergy of the dioceses of Oxford and Canterbury, 1769
Lectures on the catechism of the Church of England, 1769, 1770, 1771, 1774, 1777, 1778, 1786, 1789, 1790, 1791, 1794 [Dublin], 1799
A letter to the Right Honourable Horatio Walpole, Esq; [...] concerning bishops in America, 1769
Sermons on several subjects, 1770
Eight charges delivered to the clergy of the dioceses of Oxford and Canterbury, 1770, 1771, 1780, 1790, 1799
Sermons on several subjects, 1771, 1772, 1790, 1795
Five sermons against popery, 1772 Dublin, 1773 Cork and Dublin Six sermons on the liturgy of the Church of England, 1773, 1784 Cork
The works of Thomas Secker, 1775 Dublin, 1792 Edinburgh
Four discourses on self-examination, on lying, on patience, and on contentment, 1777
Nine sermons preached in the parish of St. James, Westminster, 1780, 1795
A brief confutation of the errors of the Church of Rome, 1781, 1785, 1796
On the relative duties between parents and children, and between masters and servants, 1787, 1790
Against evil-speaker, lying, rash vows, swearing, cursing, and perjury, 1787
A sermon on confirmation, 1788, 1790
Of the Lord's supper, 1788
Catechism of the Church of England, 1789
Questions extracted from Archbishop Secker's Lectures on the church catechism: for the use of schools and young persons in private families, 1790
Instructions given to candidates for orders, after their subscribing the articles, 1791
Familiar explanation of the service of confirmation, used by the Church of England, abridged from Archbishop Secker's sermon on confirmation, 1795
A sermon on confirmation, 1795

See also John Sharp, [...] Archbishop Sharp's and Archbishop Secker's sermons against perjury and common swearing, with some alterations, Dublin, 1771

== Arms ==
Coat of arms of Coat of arms of Thomas Secker as Archbishop of Canterbury
Notes While Secker was serving as a bishop his arms would be displayed impaled with those of the diocese and topped by a mitre. Escutcheon The See of Canterbury impaling Gules a bend engrailed between two bulls’ heads couped Or.

Church of England titles
Preceded by Charles Cecil	Bishop of Bristol; 1735–1737	Succeeded by Thomas Gooch
Preceded by John Potter	Bishop of Oxford; 1737–1758	Succeeded by John Hume
Preceded by Joseph Butler	Dean of St Paul's; 1750–1758	Succeeded by John Hume
Preceded by Matthew Hutton	Archbishop of Canterbury; 1758–1768	Succeeded by Frederick Cornwallis
