= George Redford =

English clergyman (1785–1860)

George Redford D.D. (1785–1860) was an English nonconformist minister.

== Life ==
Born in Oxford Street, London, on 27 September 1785, Redford was educated at Hoxton College and the University of Glasgow, where he matriculated in 1808 and graduated M.A. in 1811. In 1809 he was ordained in the Congregational ministry, and was admitted to the pastoral charge of the Independent congregation at Uxbridge in 1812. There he founded, and for some time ran, the Congregational Magazine. In June 1826 he succeeded Robert Vaughan in the ministry at Angel Street chapel, Worcester.

In 1834 Redford was chosen president of the Congregational Union of England and Wales, and received from the University of Glasgow the honorary degree of LL.D., and the degree of D.D. was afterwards conferred upon him by Amherst University, Massachusetts. In 1856 he resigned his charge at Worcester, in poor health, and retired to Edgbaston, Birmingham, so as to be near his friend John Angell James. He died at his residence in Monument Lane, Edgbaston, on 20 May 1860. He was married and left a family.

== Works ==
Redford composed the Declaration of the Faith, Church Order, and Discipline of the Congregational or Independent Dissenters that was adopted by the Congregational Union in 1833. He wrote also:

- A Defence of Extempore Prayer, and of the Mode of Preaching generally adopted by the Calvinistic Dissenters, in reply to a Sermon preached by the Dean of Chester, London [1816]. Against Robert Hodgson.
- The true Age of Reason: a candid Examination of the Claims of Modern Deism, containing a Demonstration of the Insufficiency of unassisted Reason to lead Mankind to Happiness, to Virtue, and to God, London, 1821.
- Memoirs and Select Remains of the late Rev. John Cooke, London, 1828.
- The Pastor's Sketch-Book; or authentic Narratives of real Characters, 3rd edit., London, 1829.
- The Church of England indefensible from the Holy Scriptures, in reply … especially to two Discourses by J. Garbett, entitled "The Church Defended", London, 1833. Against James Garbett
- The Great Change: a Treatise on Conversion, London [1844?], with an introduction by John Angell James.
- Body and Soul; or Life, Mind, and Matter, considered as to their peculiar nature and combined condition in living things, London, 1847.
- True Greatness: a Brief Memoir of John Angell James of Birmingham, London, 1860, reprinted from the Evangelical Magazine, with additions.

In 1837 Redford delivered the Congregational lectures in connection with the Congregational Library, which were published as Holy Scripture verified; or the Divine Authority of the Bible confirmed by an appeal to Facts of Science, History, and Human Consciousness, London, 1837, and 1853. He was a contributor to the North British Review, the British Quarterly Review and the Eclectic Review; and he edited The Family and Closet Expositor, 1830; The Evangelist (1837 onwards) with John Leifchild; Charles Grandison Finney's Lectures on Systematic Theology, 1851; and The Autobiography of the Rev. William Jay (1854) with John Angell James. He also, with Thomas Harry Riches, compiled The History of the ancient Town of Uxbridge (Uxbridge, 1818, and again 1885).

== Notes ==
Attribution

This article incorporates text from a publication now in the public domain: Lee, Sidney, ed. (1896). "Redford, George". Dictionary of National Biography. Vol. 47. London: Smith, Elder & Co.
