= Robert Vaughan (minister) =

English minister, academic, college head and writer

Robert Vaughan (1795–1868) was an English minister of the Congregationalist communion, academic, college head and writer, from a Welsh background. He was professor of history in the London University, and then president of the Independent College, Manchester. He founded, and for a time edited, the British Quarterly.

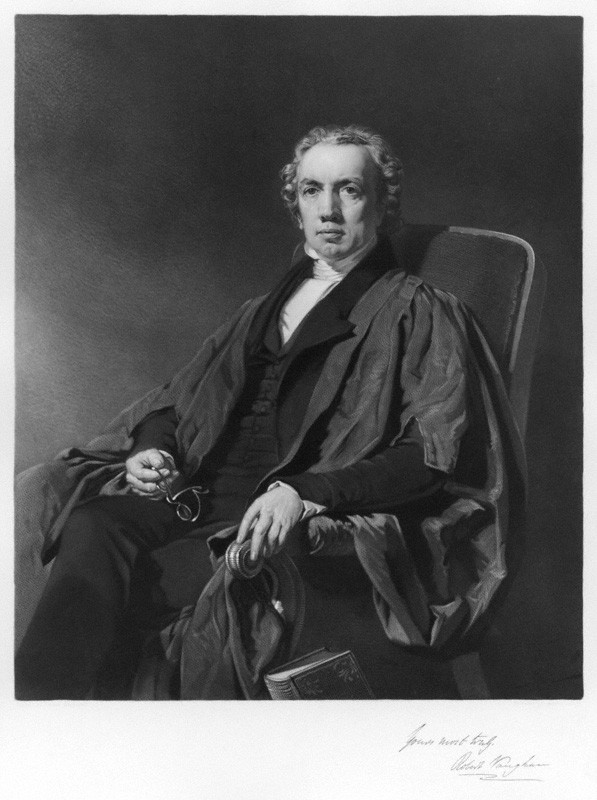
Robert Vaughan, 1850 engraving

== Life ==
Vaughan was born in the West of England on 14 October 1795, to Anglican parents. He came under the influence of William Thorp (1771–1833), Independent minister at Castle Green, Bristol, who trained him for the ministry: Thorp influenced his early style of preaching, which was declamatory and active. While still a student he was invited (1819) by the Independent congregation in Angel Street, Worcester, accepted the call in April, and was ordained on 4 July, among his ordainers being William Jay and John Angell James. He became popular, and in March 1825 accepted a call to Hornton Street, Kensington, London, in succession to John Leifchild.

In 1834 Vaughan was appointed to the chair of history in London University. His connection with the London University brought him into relations with the Whig political leaders, and increased his influence. In 1836 he received the diploma of D.D. from Glasgow University. In 1843 he succeeded Gilbert Wardlaw as president and professor of theology in Lancashire Independent College, removed (26 April) to new buildings at Whalley Range, Manchester.

Dissatisfied with the Eclectic Review, which, under the editorship of Thomas Price, was favouring the policy of Edward Miall, Vaughan started the British Quarterly, bringing out the first number in January 1845. During 20 years of editorship he retained its nonconformist character and its theological conservatism, but admitted on other topics a wide range of writers.

In 1846 Vaughan occupied the chair of the Congregational Union. In August 1857 poor health led him to resign his presidency of the Lancashire Independent College, when he was succeeded by Henry Rogers. After ministering for a short time to a small congregation at Uxbridge, Middlesex, he retired to St. John's Wood, and concentrated on writing.

In 1867 Vaughan accepted a call to a newly formed congregation at Torquay. Shortly after he moved there, he was seized with congestion of the brain. He died at Torquay on 15 June 1868, and was buried there.

== Works ==
By his Life and Opinions of John de Wycliffe, D.D., illustrated principally from his unpublished Manuscripts (1828; 2nd edit. 1831, 2 vols.), and his Memorials of the Stuart Dynasty (1831), Vaughan gained an initial reputation as historian. He published his introductory lecture On the Study of General History, 1834. Other historical works were:

- Protectorate of Oliver Cromwell, 1838, 2 vols.;
- The History of England under the House of Stuart … 1603–88, 1840;
- Edited for the Wyclif Society, Tracts and Treatises of John de Wycliffe … with … Memoir, 1845;
- John de Wycliffe, D.D.: a Monograph, 1853; and
- Revolutions in English History (1859–63, 3 vols.; 2nd edit. 1865).

Vaughan published his inaugural discourse on Protestant Nonconformity, 1843. Taking part in the nonconformist publications for the bicentennial of the Act of Uniformity 1662, his tract in reply to George Venables's pamphlet questioning the right of the ejected ministers to a place in the English church was called I'll tell you: an Answer to "How did they get there?" (1862). As a religious and general writer his other works included:

- The Christian Warfare, 1832
- The "congregational lecture", a series of disquisitions on the Causes of the Corruption of Christianity, 1834.
- Thoughts on the … State of Religious Parties in England, 1838; 1839.
- Congregationalism … in relation to … Modern Society, 1842; two editions.
- The Modern Persecutor Delineated, 1842 (anon.).
- The Modern Pulpit, 1842.
- The Age of Great Cities, 1843.
- Popular Education in England, 1846 (expanded from the British Quarterly).
- The Age of Christianity, 1849; 1853.
- The Credulities of Scepticism, 1856.
- English Nonconformity, 1862.
- Ritualism in the English Church, 1866.
- The Way to Rest, 1866.
- The Church and State Question [1867].
- The Daily Prayer Book [1868].

Some of Vaughan's own contributions to the British Review were collected in Essays on History, Philosophy, and Theology, 1849, 2 vols. He edited in 1866 a folio edition of Paradise Lost, with a life of John Milton.

== Family ==
Vaughan married (1822) Susanna Ryall of Melcombe Regis, Dorset, and had several children. Robert Alfred Vaughan was his eldest son; his eldest daughter married Dr. Carl Buch, principal of the Government College at Bareilly, Upper India, who was killed in 1857 at the outbreak of the Indian Rebellion.

== Notes ==
Attribution

This article incorporates text from a publication now in the public domain: Lee, Sidney, ed. (1899). "Vaughan, Robert (1795-1868)". Dictionary of National Biography. Vol. 58. London: Smith, Elder & Co.
