= William Hendry Stowell =

Manx nonconformist minister and college administrator

William Hendry Stowell (1800–1858) was a Manx nonconformist minister, college head, writer and periodical editor.

== Life ==
Born at Douglas, Isle of Man, on 19 June 1800, he was son of William Stowell and his wife, Ann Hendry. Hugh Stowell was his cousin, and be was more distantly related to Hugh Stowell Brown. He was one of the first students at the Blackburn Academy, opened in 1816, under Dr. Joseph Fletcher. His first ministerial charge, at St. Andrew's Chapel, North Shields, extended from February 1821 to 1834, when he was appointed head of Rotherham Independent College, and pastor of Masborough congregational church. The latter post he resigned in 1849, and the former in October 1850, on his appointment as president of Cheshunt College.

In 1848 Stowell was the pioneer of the "missions to working men", and took part in the concert-hall lectures established by Nathaniel Caine at Liverpool in 1850. The University of Glasgow conferred on him the degree of D.D. in 1849, in recognition of his theological works.

Stowell resigned from Cheshunt College in 1856, and died at his residence, Roman Road, Barnsbury, London, on 2 January 1858. He married Sarah Hilton in July 1821, and left several children.

== Works ==
He wrote:

- The Ten commandments; illustrated and enforced, on Christian principles. London: B.J. Holdsworth. 1825 [1824].
- Diocesan Episcopacy Examined: a discourse, Delivered at the Ordination of the Rev. A. Reid. Newcastle: Finlay and Charlton. 1830.
- The Missionary Church. London: Hamilton, Adams & Company, J.Y. Knight. 1840 [1832].
- Rev. E. Storrow, ed. (1872). The Missionary Work of the Church: Its Principles, History, Claims, and Present Aspects (Revised ed.). London: J. Snow.
- The Miraculous Gifts considered, 1834.
- History of the Puritans in England. London: Thomas Nelson. 1878 [1847].
- William Hendry Stowell; D. Wilson (1888). The Puritans in England, and The Pilgrim Fathers. New York: Worthington.
- On the Work of the Spirit (Revised ed.). London: Jackson and Walford. 1854 [1849].
- Memoir of the Life of Richard Winter Hamilton, LL.D. London: Jackson and Walford. 1850.

He also published discourses and charges, edited the works of Thomas Adams (1847); and, for the monthly series of the Religious Tract Society, wrote:

- The History of Greece from the Earliest Times to A.D. 1833. London: Religious Tract Society. 1848.
- Lives of Illustrious Greeks, 1849.
- Life of Mohammed.
- Julius Cæsar.
- Life of Isaac Newton.

He was joint editor of the fifth series of the Eclectic Review, and a contributor to the British Quarterly Review and other congregationalist periodicals. A posthumous volume of sermons appeared in 1859, edited by his eldest son, William Stowell (died 1877).
