= Robert Halley (minister) =

English Congregational minister and abolitionist (1796–1876)

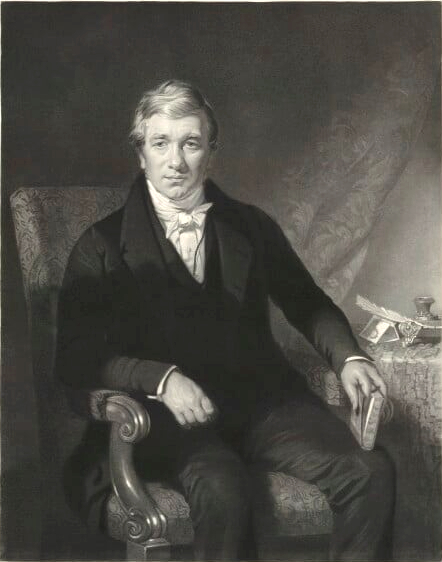
Robert Halley, 1850 engraving

Robert Halley (13 August 1796 – 18 August 1876) was an English Congregational minister and abolitionist. He became Classical Tutor at Highbury College and Principal of New College, St John's Wood, London.

== Early life ==
Robert Halley was born in Blackheath, Kent, near London. His father, Robert Hally, was a Scottish nurseryman at Blackheath; his mother was his first wife, Ann Bellows of Bere Regis, Dorset. Robert Hally worked for a time at Luton Park, the estate at Luton Hoo of John Stuart, 3rd Earl of Bute. After marrying, he set up a nursery on land belonging to Sir Gregory Page.

His father, an Anti-Burgher by background, was a deacon at the Butt Lane Chapel, where John Theodore Barker was the long-term pastor. Halley attended the chapel as a child.

His parents had met in the Bere Regis meeting house of Benjamin Howell, near which Robert Hally was working, and in which her father, a presbyterian draper, had a pew. They were married in 1795, and Robert Halley was the eldest of four children. On his mother's side, Halley was a first cousin to William Lamb Bellows, father of John Bellows. He was the son of William Bellows of Bere Regis and Elizabeth Lamb, who married in 1801 at Wareham, Dorset.

Ann Hally died while Robert was still young and he was sent to Dorset to live with a maternal uncle. He gained some classical tuition there from the parish curate. He returned a few years later to Blackheath to attend Maze Hill School in Greenwich, where he was taught mathematics by a compass-maker from Deptford Dockyard. In 1810 he began working for his father's nursery business.

Halley was encouraged to enter the ministry by Barker and Henry Hopkins (1787–1870) of Deptford. Unsuccessful in applying to Hoxton Academy, he was offered a place at Homerton College in 1816. He studied under the tutorship of John Pye Smith for a six-year course. After five years, it was Pye-Smith's colleague William Walford who discussed possible ministerial settlements with him.

== Pastor ==
Halley was ordained on 11 June 1822, succeeding Thomas Morell as pastor of an Independent congregation at St Neots, Huntingdonshire, and married in 1823. He took in pupils, one of whom was John Morell Mackenzie, a future minister who was drowned in 1843 in the wreck of the PS Pegasus, and posthumous contributor to the Dictionary of Greek and Roman Biography and Mythology. In 1826, when the new Highbury College opened north of London, Halley was invited to teach as classical tutor there. John Stoughton's biographer (his daughter Georgina King Lewis) noted Halley's tendency to allow sidetracks into informative digressions.

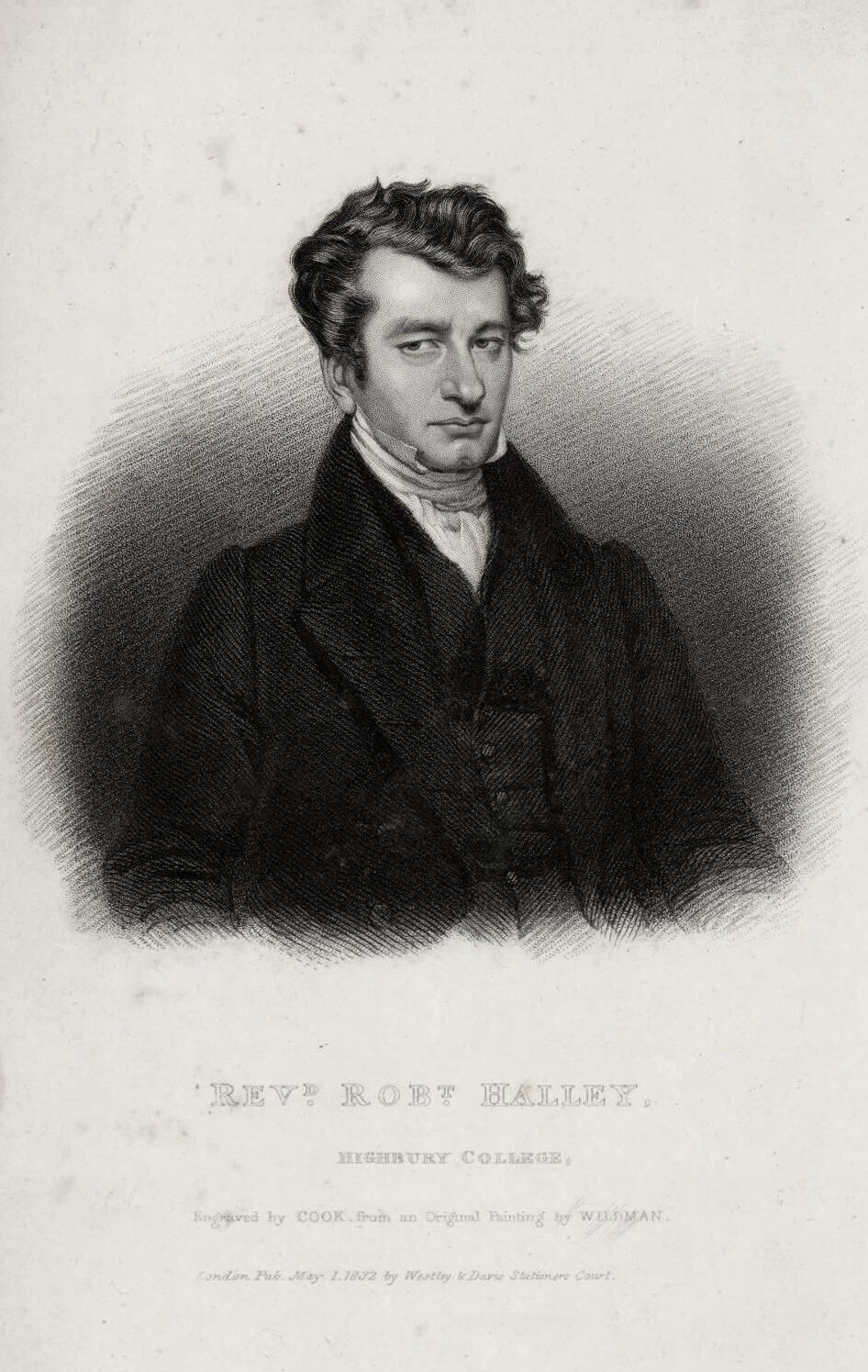
Robert Halley, 1832 engraving

In 1839 Halley returned to the ministry, as pastor of Mosley Street Chapel, Manchester, where he replaced Robert Stephens McAll (1792–1838). John Rylands was in the congregation.

From 1839 Halley was living at an address in Plymouth Grove, Manchester; it was in 1850 that William and Elizabeth Gaskell moved into 84 Plymouth Grove (its later street number). Hayes, writing in 1905 of Plymouth Grove in the 1850s, described it as "quite a select little coterie", who included Matthew Curtis, "living in handsome, well-appointed residences"; and rural, "shaded by its pretty avenue of trees". Halley joined the Manchester Literary and Philosophical Society in 1845, as Curtis had in 1843.

In 1847–8 a new Cavendish Street Chapel was built in Manchester, designed by Edward Walters, and Halley moved his congregation there. It was demolished in 1973.

== Later life and death ==
In later life, Halley became Principal of New College, London, in post from 1857 to 1872, succeeding John Harris who died in 1856. His successor in Manchester, from 1858, was Joseph Parker.

Halley died in 1876, at his son Robert's home Batworth Park, Arundel. Funeral sermons were preached by Llewelyn David Bevan, a former student, and William Urwick the younger. He was buried in Abney Park Cemetery, on 24 August.

== Selected published works ==
Halley wrote a number of books, and published sermons.

- The Sinfulness of Colonial Slavery (1833). It has been called an "uncompromisingly forthright lecture", and an "impassioned discourse", and was delivered at the Gravel Pit Chapel in Hackney. Republished c.2006 by Cornell University Library.
- The Sacraments. An Inquiry Into the Nature of the Symbolic Institutions of the Christian Religion (2 vols., 1844 and 1851)
- Memoir of Thomas Goodwin D.D., prefixed to Goodwin's Works, vol. II of the Standard Divines.
- Lancashire, its Puritanism and Nonconformity, (1869, 2 vols.)

== Views ==
According to James Branwhite French, Halley in his Manchester period was a noted platform speaker, in particular when he appeared in tandem with Robert Vaughan. French called them "champions of the cause of liberty".

In politics Halley was a Whig. In 1841 the Anti-Corn Law League ran a major conference in Manchester, and asked ministers of religion to support them, to alleviate poverty. Halley was elected to the conference committee. He wrote afterwards to his friend John Blackburn that the emerging leaders of that movement could be George Thompson, in his view a Radical, and J. W. Massie, of Salford. In the opinion of James Guinness Rogers, he flinched from political action. He did often speak in support of the League's views, from a religious angle, and was on good terms with John Bright.

== Family ==
Halley married in 1823 Rebekah Sloman Jacob, daughter of James Jacob of Deptford. The couple had three daughters and three sons. Of the sons:

- Robert Halley (1827–1885) went to study in Bonn with William Roby Fletcher in 1849. He became a tutor at Lancashire Independent College, and principal of the Protestant College, Madras. He published a memoir of his father, A Short Biography of Rev. Robert Halley D.D. (1879), with some of his father's sermons. He was married in 1852 by his father at Cavendish Street Chapel to Mary Roberton, daughter of John Roberton.
- Jacob John Halley (1834–1910) was a noted Congregational minister in Australia; Jacob's daughter was the physician and activist Gertrude Halley.
- Ebenezer Halley (1836–1875) was the Assistant Surgeon to the Melbourne Gaol in Australia and later a doctor in Lawrence, New Zealand where he died. His son Robert was principal of Tettenhall College in Staffordshire, then in 1873 became minister of Trinity Church in Arundel, where he remained until his death in 1885.

Rebecca Sloman Halley, the eldest daughter, married in 1850 John Hurst Cheetham. Cheetham was a muslin merchant, in a partnership Hobday & Cheetham, dissolved in 1846. He became secretary of the Cavendish Road Chapel in 1848. In 1854 he transferred his assets to creditors; in 1863 he suffered bankruptcy, and in 1864, described as a salesman, he was discharged. Their daughter Rebecca Halley Cheetham was the first Warden of the Canning Town Women's Settlement from the 1890s.

Eliza, youngest daughter, married Walter Ashton of Warrington, and died in 1894, aged 65; he was manager of the Warrington District Bank, belonged to the Wycliffe Congregational Church there, and died in 1902. The barrister Arthur Jacob Ashton was their son.

== Awards and honours ==
In 1834 Halley was awarded an honorary degree of D.D. from Princeton College, New Jersey. It recognised his replies in controversy with James Yates, published in a pamphlet The Improved Version truly designated a Creed. It concerned the Unitarian version of the New Testament of Charles Wellbeloved (1808).
