= John Kelly (minister) =

Scottish minister

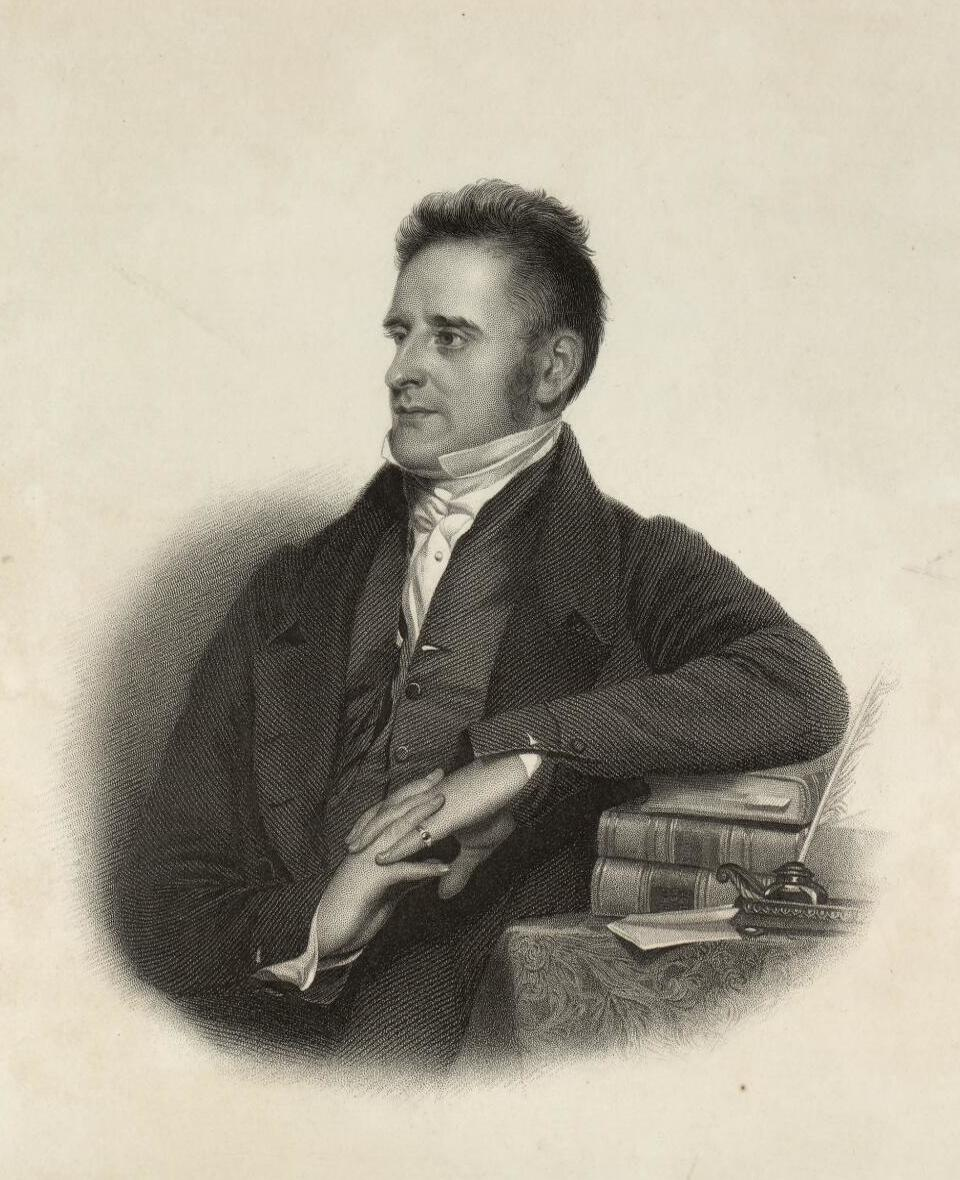
Portrait of John Kelly

John Kelly (1801–1876) was a Scottish Congregational minister.

== Life ==
Kelly was born in Edinburgh on 1 December 1801, received his education at Heriot's Hospital, and at an early age was converted by the preaching of Dr. Robert Gordon of Edinburgh. He was for some time engaged in tuition in the West Riding of Yorkshire, and for four years later studied at the dissenting academy at Idle, West Yorkshire, which was later known as Airedale College.

In January 1827 he was sent to Liverpool to preach at Bethesda Chapel, and was ordained to the charge in September 1829. His career as a minister was very successful, and the new Crescent Chapel built for his growing congregation at Everton, Liverpool, was opened on 23 November 1837.

Kelly was for many years a director of the London Missionary Society, and took a warm interest in the Lancashire Independent College. He was chairman of the meeting of the Congregational Union of England and Wales in London in May 1851, and of the meeting held at Northampton in the following October.

He retired from the Crescent Chapel on 28 September 1873, and died at 18 Richmond Terrace, Liverpool, on 12 June 1876. He was buried in the necropolis on 15 June.

== Works ==
Kelly was author of many addresses and single sermons, and of:

1. ‘The Voluntary Support of the Christian Ministry the Law of the New Testament,’ 1838.
2. ‘The Hindrances which Civil Establishments present to the Progress of genuine Religion,’ 1840.
3. ‘The Church Catechism considered in its Character and Tendency,’ 1843.
4. ‘Discourses on Holy Scripture,’ 1850.
5. ‘An Examination of the Explanation of the Rev. Samuel Davidson, relative to the Second Volume of the Tenth Edition of Horne's "Introduction,"’ 1857.
6. ‘The Divine Covenants: Their Nature and Design; or, The Covenants Considered as Successive Stages in the Development of the Divine Purposes of Mercy,’ 1861. This 344 page book is described as "The Congregational Lecture for 1860".
