= Robert Alfred Vaughan =

Robert Alfred Vaughan (1823–1857) was an English Congregationalist minister and author.

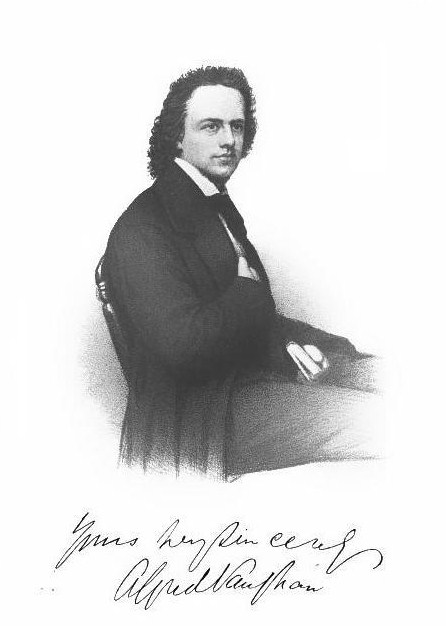
Robert Alfred Vaughan

== Life ==
The eldest child of Robert Vaughan, he was born at Worcester on 18 March 1823, a seven-months child who was frail. His father began his education, and he entered University College school, London, in 1836 at age 13. Passing on to University College, he graduated B.A. at the age of 19 (1842) with classical honours, in London University. In 1843 he became a student at the Lancashire Independent College, under his father's presidency.

Having finished his course in Manchester, and become engaged to be married, Vaughan spent a session (1846–7) at the University of Halle, coming under the influence of Julius Müller and August Tholuck. At this time he thought his main object should be a series of ecclesiastical dramas to illustrate church history: Tholuck suggested the study of philosophy. Between June and October 1847 he travelled in Italy with his father. Early in 1848 he became assistant to William Jay at Argyle Chapel, Bath. He expected to be ordained as colleague and successor to Jay, and resigned when difficulties were made about this; his engagement ended on 24 March 1850.

Accepting a call from Ebenezer Chapel, Steelhouse Lane, Birmingham, Vaughan was ordained there on 8 September 1850. He was learning Spanish and Dutch (to add to French, German, and Italian) to gain access to writings of mystics, and was contributing constantly to the British Quarterly. In the autumn of 1854 he visited Glasgow but declined a call to succeed Ralph Wardlaw, returned home ill, and was laid up for two months with pleurisy. In the spring of 1855 symptoms of pulmonary disease were apparent; he resigned his charge, preaching his last sermon on 24 June.

Vaughan was an invalid at Bournemouth, St. John's Wood, and Westbourne Park, London. He died at 19 Alexander Street, Westbourne Park, on 26 October 1857.

== Works ==
Vaughan's first publication was The Witch of Endor, and other Poems, 1844. His father set him on reading Origen for an article for the British Quarterly; when published (October 1845) it won praise from Sir James Stephen and Sir Thomas Noon Talfourd. To the London University Magazine he contributed in 1846 a dramatic piece Edwin and Elgiva.

While at Bath Vaughan wrote articles for the British Quarterly on Schleiermacher and Savonarola, and planned from 1849 his work on the mystics. In August 1855 he put to press Hours with the Mystics, in dialogue form, published in March 1856, 2 vols.; an enlarged edition appeared in 1860, edited by his father; a third edition in 1880, edited by his son, Wycliffe Vaughan.

In 1857 Vaughan was still contributing articles to Fraser's Magazine and the British Quarterly. His Essays and Remains were published in 1858, 2 vols. Some of his letters are in Positive Religion, 1857, edited by Edward White.

== Family ==
About 1848 Vaughan married the only child of James Finlay of Newcastle upon Tyne.

== Notes ==
Attribution

This article incorporates text from a publication now in the public domain: Lee, Sidney, ed. (1899). "Vaughan, Robert Alfred". Dictionary of National Biography. Vol. 58. London: Smith, Elder & Co.
