= Joseph Fletcher (minister) =

English Congregationalist minister, college head and theological writer

Joseph Fletcher D.D.
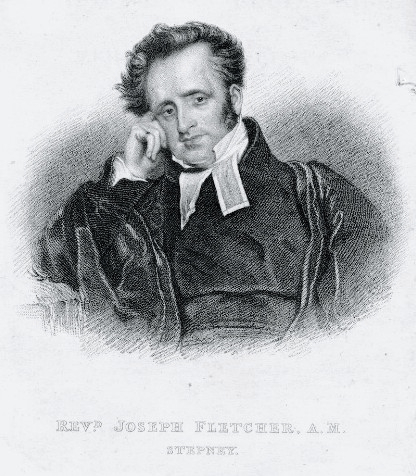
- Portrait of Joseph Fletcher after John Robert Wildman
- Born: 1784; Chester
- Died: 1843 (aged 58–59)
- Occupation: minister
- Title: The Reverend
- Children: Joseph Fletcher the younger
- Father: Robert Fletcher

Joseph Fletcher D.D. (1784–1843) was an English Congregationalist minister, college head and theological writer.

== Life ==
Fletcher was born 3 December 1784 at Chester, where his father Robert Fletcher was a goldsmith. In his boyhood he was deeply impressed by the gospel, and after attending Chester grammar school, prepared for the ministry in the Independent church by studying, first at Hoxton Academy and then at the University of Glasgow, where he took the degree of M.A. in 1807. Receiving a call from the congregational church of Blackburn, Lancashire, he began his ministry the same year, and continued there till 1823, when he became minister of the Stepney Meeting House in London.

In 1816 Fletcher added to his duties that of theological tutor in the Blackburn College for training ministers. In 1830 the senatus of the University of Glasgow conferred on him the degree of D.D. He was chairman of the Congregational Union of England and Wales in 1837. As a preacher he showed a combination of reasoning power and emotional fervour. He died 8 June 1843.

== Works ==
Fletcher was a voluminous writer. He was a regular contributor to the Eclectic Review. His papers gave proof of ample stores of information, and of a scholarly and powerful pen. On particular subjects Fletcher published tracts and treatises that won considerable fame. His lectures on the Principles and Institutions of the Roman Catholic Religion (1817) won appreciation, John Pye Smith, Robert Hall, and others expressing a high opinion of them. A discourse on Personal Election and Divine Sovereignty (1825) was also much commended. A volume of poems (1846) was the joint production of himself and his sister, Mary Fletcher.

== Family ==
Fletcher married Mary France. Joseph Fletcher the younger (1816–1876), Congregationalist minister, was their fourth son.
