= Thomas Richard Barker =

Thomas Richard Barker (1799–1870), was an English Independent minister and college tutor.

== Life ==
Barker was born in London on 30 November 1799, and was entered at Christ's Hospital in 1807, where he remained until age 16. He wished to proceed to Cambridge to for classical studies, with a view to taking holy orders; his parents, however, who were strict nonconformists, refused to agree. In time he decided to entering Homerton Old College and prepare himself for the congregational ministry, in 1821. He married the same or the following year, thereby cutting short his college course.

In 1822 he became pastor of a village church at Alresford, Hampshire, and two years later he moved to Harpenden, where he spent nine years as minister and teacher. In 1833 he moved to Uxbridge, and in 1838 was appointed (at the recommendation of John Pye-Smith) the tutor in classics and Hebrew at Spring Hill College, Birmingham. Here in the following year he was joined by Henry Rogers. Barker was provided with quarters in the college, and was responsible for the maintenance of its discipline.

On 22 November 1870 he found himself too weak to rise, and spent the day in bed. In the evening, shortly before nine o'clock, he fell asleep, and though he woke again after a few minutes, he had already lost the power of speech, and died the next morning. He was buried on the 29th in the Birmingham general cemetery.

== Family ==
Barker was married more than once. His first wife died in 1833. He left a wife, two daughters, and three sons, of whom one, the Rev. Philip C. Barker, became professor of mathematics at Rotherham Congregational College, Sheffield.
