= Yorkshire United Independent College =

Theological college (1888–1958)

Yorkshire United Independent College was a Congregational theological college located on Emm Lane in Bradford, West Yorkshire, England. Formed in 1888 through the merger of Airedale College and Rotherham Independent College, it provided ministerial training for the Congregational churches of Yorkshire until the mid-20th century. The purpose-built Victorian Gothic building, designed by Lockwood and Mawson and constructed between 1874 and 1877, is now a Grade II listed structure.

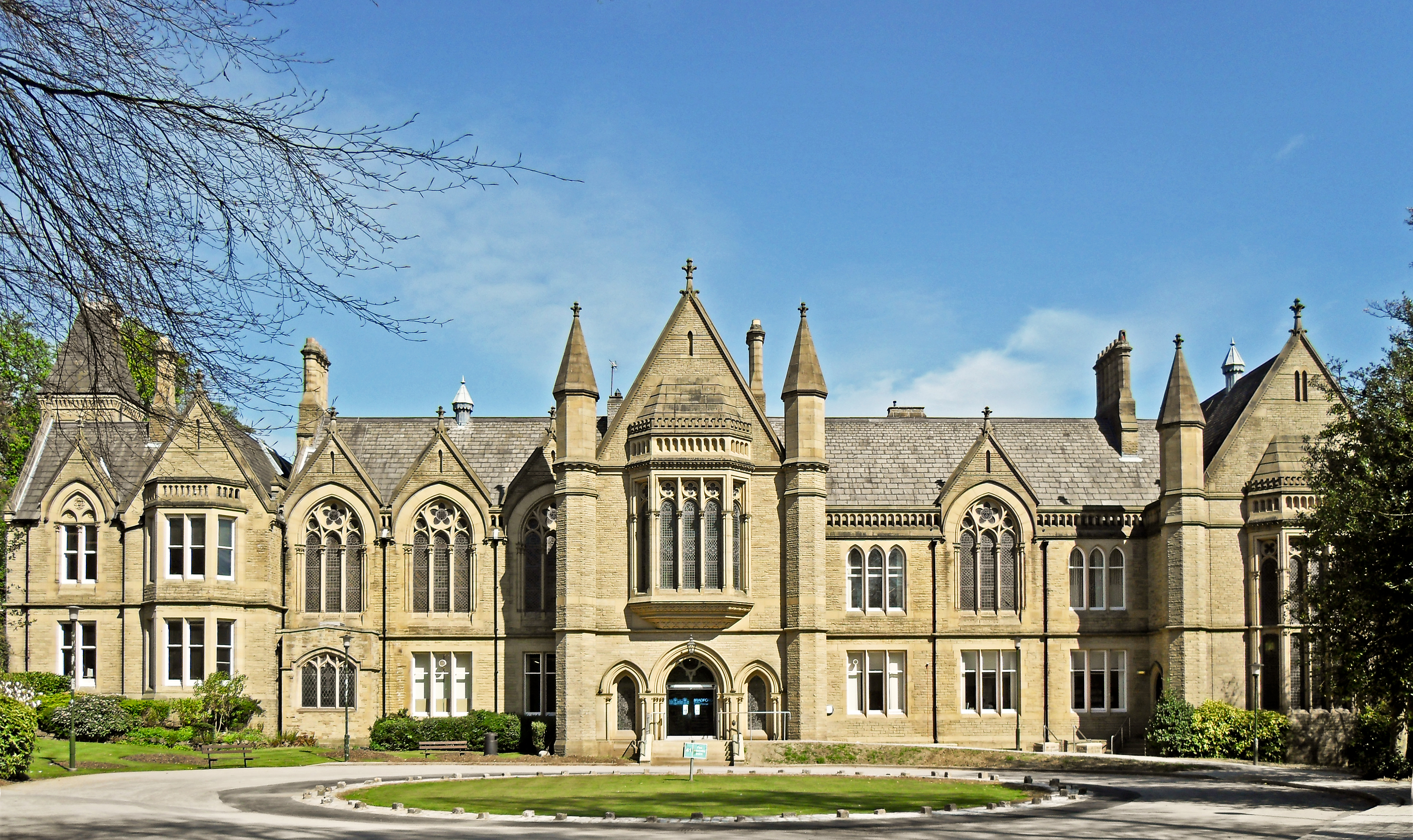
Yorkshire United Independent College

== History ==
The theological college on Emm Lane in Bradford originated with Airedale College, a Congregationalist institution whose purpose-built premises were constructed between 1874 and 1877. In 1888, Airedale College merged with Rotherham Independent College, forming the Yorkshire United Independent College, which thereafter served as a centre for Congregational ministerial training in Yorkshire.

The college continued to operate in Bradford until the mid-20th century. Archival records held by the John Rylands Library, University of Manchester, list the Yorkshire United Independent College as an active institution until 1958, after which it ceased to exist as a separate body.

In 1958, as part of a wider reorganisation of Congregational theological education in northern England, the Yorkshire United Independent College was amalgamated with the Lancashire Independent College in Manchester. This merger contributed to the formation of the Northern Congregational College, based in Manchester, which inherited the ministerial training functions of both predecessor institutions. It is now part of the United Reformed Church, known as Northern College.

== Building and architecture ==
The college building was designed by the architectural firm Lockwood and Mawson and constructed between 1874 and 1877. Built in sandstone, it is an example of Early Decorated Gothic Revival architecture, with pointed arches, traceried windows, and a collegiate layout intended to reflect medieval university buildings.

The structure is listed at Grade II on the National Heritage List for England, recognising both its architectural quality and its historical association with theological education.

== Academic life and influence ==
The Yorkshire United Independent College attracted a number of notable theologians and educators. Among them was Cecil John Cadoux, a prominent New Testament scholar and Christian pacifist, who taught at the college in the early 20th century.

The college was part of a wider network of Congregational and Free Church colleges that sought to combine academic theology with a strong emphasis on conscience, social responsibility, and independence from state control.

== Closure and current use ==
Following changes in theological education and the declining number of ministerial candidates after the Second World War, the college ceased operating as a theological institution in the mid-20th century.

Although the college's institutional life ended in 1958, the Emm Lane building remained in educational use. In 1963 it was acquired by the Bradford Institute of Technology, later the University of Bradford, and was used for management and professional education until 2019.

After the University of Bradford vacated the site in 2019, the Emm Lane building formed part of the 14-acre Heaton Mount estate, which was sold in August 2021 to the Greensville Trust, a charity registered in England and Wales in 2010 and based in Liverpool, whose stated objects include the advancement of Islam and of education. The trust is funded mainly through public donations and course or event fees, including a £240,000 government grant in the 2024–25 financial year. Announcing the sale, the university said the trust intended to convert the estate for mixed uses including community facilities, adult education, a primary school and nursery, a hotel and function spaces, a business centre, and a "mosque/prayer facility".

According to the trust, the purchase was completed in July 2021 following a fundraising campaign begun in 2020, after which the estate was renamed Mustafa Mount. The trust states that the site accommodates the Rawdah Mosque and Madrasah, Islamic studies programmes for children and adults, daily classes, a sports club, an exhibition gallery and a business incubator. Weekly Friday (jumuʿah) congregational prayers at the Rawdah Mosque, open to men and women, have been advertised by the site's operators since at least March 2024. The trust's entry in the register of charities lists Bradford among its areas of operation.

== Proposed conversion ==
In 2022 the trust published its proposals for adapting the Emm Lane building. Under the scheme, the interior of the 1877 building would be adapted rather than a new prayer hall built. In a documentary film published by the trust, the architect Warwick Pethers and the landscape designer Anthony Milroy, both of whom work in the Gothic Revival tradition, the former having trained under Stephen Dykes Bower, set out the principles behind the design.

The former assembly hall was to serve as the prayer hall, with a later mezzanine floor removed to restore the room's full height and its panelled hammerbeam roof left exposed. New openings into adjoining spaces are modelled on arches and cast-iron columns found elsewhere in the building, which the architects say would raise capacity from roughly 150 to around 550 Muslim worshippers. The forecourt was to be laid out as a walled paradise garden, forming a transitional space between the grounds and the mosque and drawing on both Islamic garden design and the English cloister garth.

The architects describe Gothic as an appropriate idiom for a mosque in England, citing an argument associated with the architect Abdel-Wahed El-Wakil that Islamic architecture has historically adopted local building traditions in the regions it reached. In 2025 the trust was still raising funds towards the scheme through a public appeal to sponsor bricks.

== Legacy ==
The building is an example of the purpose-built nonconformist colleges established in northern England during the Victorian period, and its Grade II listing cites both its architectural quality and its association with theological education. It has been used successively as a Congregational theological college, as the management school of the University of Bradford, and, since 2021, as part of a Muslim educational and community centre; the site functions as the Rawdah Mosque, at which congregational prayers are held, alongside a madrasah and other community facilities.
