= Andrew Martin Fairbairn =

British academic

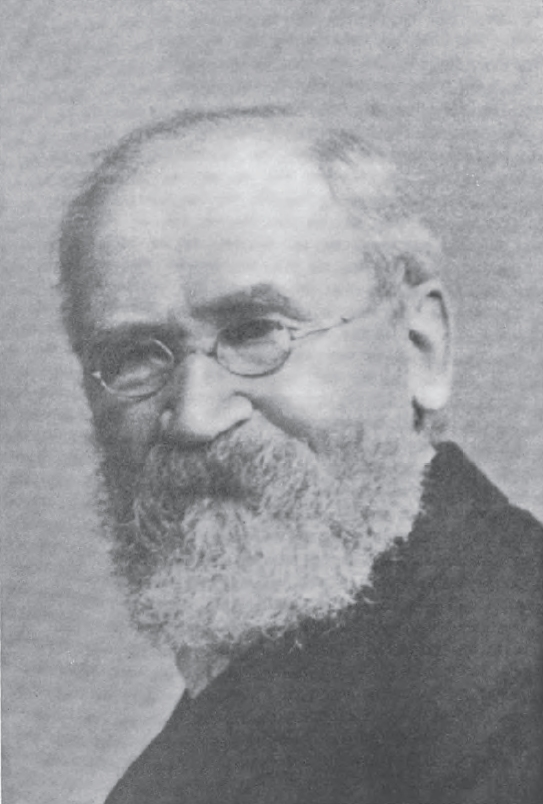
Andrew Martin Fairbairn (1838–1912)

Andrew Martin Fairbairn, FBA (4 November 1838 – 9 February 1912) was a Scottish theological scholar, born in Inverkeithing, Scotland. He was the principal of Mansfield College, Oxford.

== Early life and education ==
Fairbairn was born at 12 Preston Crescent, Inverkeithing, on 4 November 1838.

He was educated at the University of Edinburgh, the University of Berlin, and at the Evangelical Union Theological Academy in Glasgow. He entered the Congregational church ministry and held pastorates at Bathgate, West Lothian and at Aberdeen.

On 27 February 1869, he married Jeannie Shields of Bathgate.

== Educator ==
From 1877 to 1886 he was principal of Airedale College, Bradford, England, a post which he gave up to become the first principal of Mansfield College, Oxford. In the transference to the University of Oxford of the existing Spring Hill College, Birmingham, he took a considerable part, and he exercised influence not only over generations of his own students (most famous of which is probably Peter Taylor Forsyth), but also over a large number of undergraduates in the university generally. He was granted the degree of M.A. by a decree of Convocation, and in January 1903 received an honorary Doctor of Literature (D.Litt) degree.From January 1903 he was a lecturer in Classical Archaeology. He was also awarded Doctor of Divinity degrees from Edinburgh and Yale universities, and a Doctor of Laws from the University of Aberdeen.

His activities were not, however, limited to his college work. He delivered the Muir lectures at Edinburgh University (1878–1882), the Gifford lectures at Aberdeen (1892–1894), the Lyman Beecher lecture at Yale (1891–1892), and the Haskell lectures in India (1898–1899). He was a member of the Royal Commission on Secondary Education in 1894–1895, and of the Royal Commission on the Endowments of the Welsh Church in 1906. In 1883 he was chairman of the Congregational Union of England and Wales. He resigned his position at Mansfield College in the spring of 1909. He was a prolific writer on theological subjects.

== Reception ==
William Boothby Selbie writes in The Life of Andrew Martin Fairbairn:

Among the subjects which occupied his attention in the years 1902 and 1903 were two articles for the second volume of the Cambridge Modern History... The first of these was on "Calvin and the Reformed Church," and the second on "Tendencies of European Thought in the Age of the Reformation." In Calvin Fairbairn had a subject altogether to his mind, and his study of him is among the best things he ever wrote.

== Works ==
- Studies in the Philosophy of Religion and History (1876)
- Studies in the Life of Christ (1881)
- Religion in History and in Modern Life (1884; rev. 1893)
- Christ in Modern Theology (1893)
- Christ in the Centuries (1893)
- Catholicism Roman and Anglican (1899)
- Philosophy of the Christian Religion (1902)
