= Clulow =

Clulow is a surname. Notable people with this surname include:

- Jennifer Clulow (born 1942), British actress and television presenter
- William Benton Clulow (1802–1882), British minister
