= John Waddington (minister) =

19th-century English Congregational divine

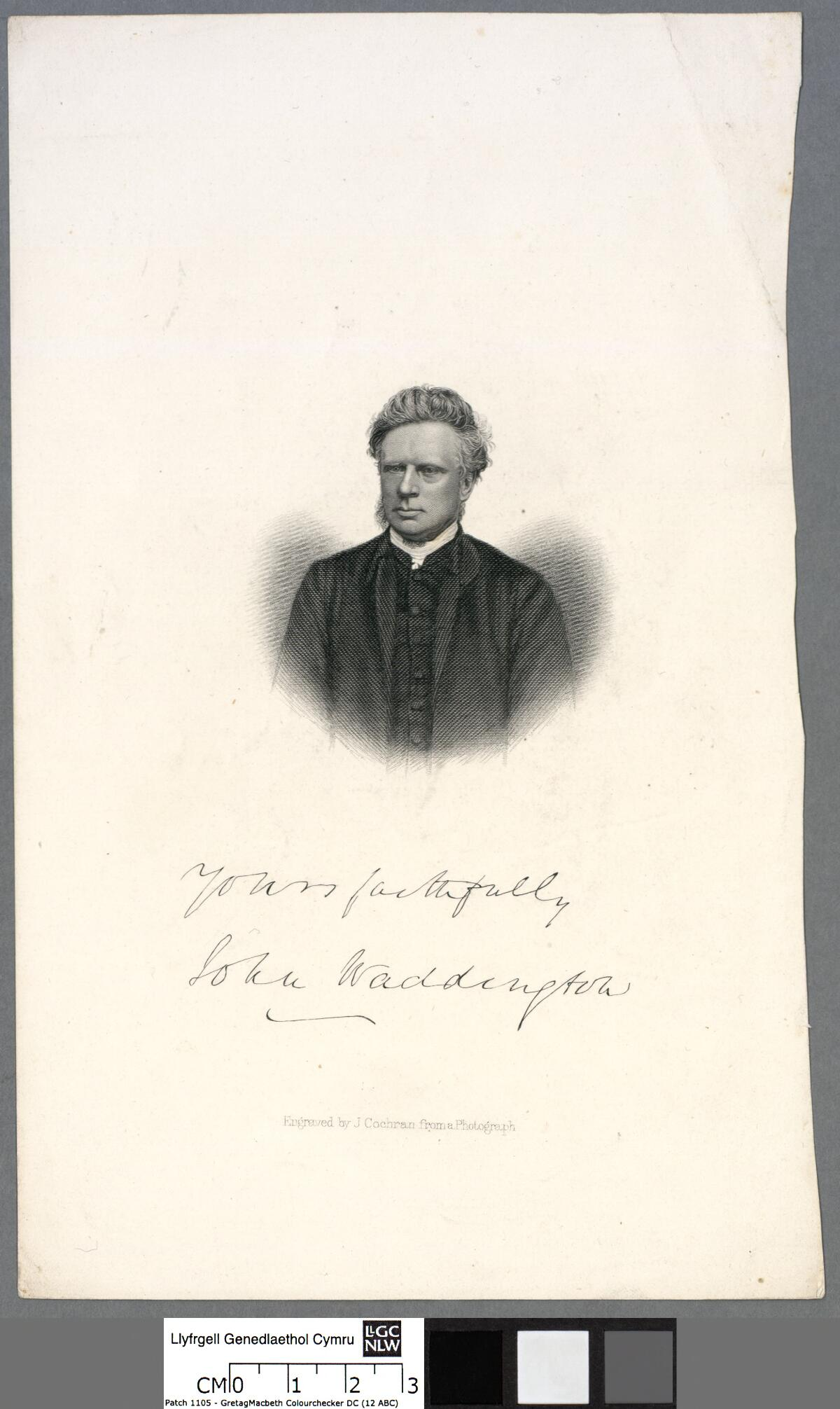
Portrait of Waddington c. 1850

John Waddington (1810–1880) was an English Congregational divine who wrote an important series of books on the history of the Congregational Church in England.

== Life ==
Waddington was born in Leeds in Yorkshire on 10 December 1810, to George and Elizabeth Waddington. At the age of fifteen he began to preach in the cottages of the neighbours. Before he was 19 he preached for Airedale College, the demand for student-preachers being greater than the supply. He then entered Airedale College, and, after a brief theological course under William Vint, was ordained pastor of the congregational church in Orchard Street, Stockport, on 23 May 1833. At Stockport he introduced Sunday schools connected with the congregationalist churches. He also conducted a government enquiry into distress and poverty in the town, the results of which were published in a blue-book.

In 1846 he moved to Southwark, to Union Street Chapel, the oldest congregational church in the world. He found it in financial difficulties, which at one time threatened to disperse the congregation, but which he eventually overcame. In May 1864, with the support of leading congregationalists such as Thomas Binney and Samuel Morley a new building, under the name The Pilgrim Church. was opened in Buckenham Square; erected as a memorial to the Pilgrim Fathers, several of whom were claimed for the congregation.

== Works ==
In 1854 he published John Penry: the Pilgrim Martyr (London), and in 1861 a more general treatise on Congregational Martyrs (London) (intended to form part of a series of Historical Papers but these were not continued). The work reached a second edition in the following year.

It was followed in 1862 by an essay on Congregational Church History from the Reformation to 1662, London, a popular work which obtained the bicentenary prize offered by the Congregational Union. In 1866 he published Surrey Congregational History, London, in which he dealt with the records of his own congregation.

In 1869 he began the issue of his major work on Congregational History, which occupied the latter part of his life. It was completed to 1880 in five volumes, becoming the most comprehensive treatise on any English body of nonconformists.

== Death and honours ==
Waddington died on 30 September 1880 in London. He received the honorary degree of D.D. from Williams College in Massachusetts.
