= Cadoux =

Cadoux may refer to:

- Cadoux, Western Australia, town in the Wheatbelt region
- Cecil John Cadoux (1883–1947), British Christian theologian and writer

== See also ==
- Tom Cadoux-Hudson (born 1959), British rower
