= Cecil John Cadoux =

Cecil John Cadoux (1883 – 16 August 1947) was a British Christian theologian and writer. He was influential in shaping Christian pacifist thought in the early 20th century and helped bridge scholarship and activism. His theological writings emphasized that early Christians overwhelmingly rejected military service and violence, a position he believed contemporary Christians should emulate.

== Early life ==
Cadoux was born in Smyrna (Turkey), the third son of William H. Cadoux and Emma Temple Cadoux. He was a student at Mansfield College, Oxford, where he was appointed (1914) Isherwood Fellow and Lecturer in Hebrew. He moved to the Yorkshire United Independent College at Shipley, in 1919, as professor of New Testament Criticism, Exegesis and Theology and of Christian Sociology. In 1933 he returned to Oxford as Mackennal professor of Church History and vice-principal of Mansfield College.

== Career ==
Cadoux was a Congregationalist. Linked also to the Quakers, he participated to the Friends' Ambulance Unit as a conscientious objector in the First World War. He wrote many books on Christian Pacifism, including Christian Pacifism Re-examined (1940). During the Second World War Cadoux's two sons became conscientious objectors, and also served in the FAU.

== Personal life ==
Cadoux married Marguerite Asplin. At the time of his death, Cadoux was considering to write a book on the humane treatment of animals. He was a strict vegetarian.

=== Death ===
Cadoux died on 16 August 1947 at his home in Oxford.

== Bibliography ==
- The Early Christian Attitude To War: a contribution to the history of Christian ethics (1919)
- The Guidance of Jesus for Today (1920)
- The Christian Crusade: a study in the supreme purpose of life (1924)
- The Message about the Cross: a fresh study of the doctrine of the atonement (1924)
- The Early Church and the World: a history of the Christian attitude to pagan society and the state down to the time of Constantius (1925)
- The Resurrection and Second Advent of Jesus (1927)
- Catholicism and Christianity: a vindication of progressive Protestantism (1928)
- The Possibility of a United Christendom: from the standpoint of the Congregational Communion (1937)
- The Case for Evangelical Modernism: a study of the relation between Christian faith and traditional theology (1938)
- Ancient Smyrna: a history of the city from the earliest times to 324 A.D. (1938)
- Christian Pacifism Re-Examined (1940)
- The Historic Mission of Jesus: a constructive re-examination of the eschatological teaching in the synoptic gospels (1941)
- A Pilgrim's Further Progress: dialogues on Christian teaching (1943)
- Philip of Spain and the Netherlands: an essay on moral judgments in history (1947)
- The Life of Jesus (1948)
