= Jacob John Halley =

Australian naturalist and congressional minister (1834-1910)

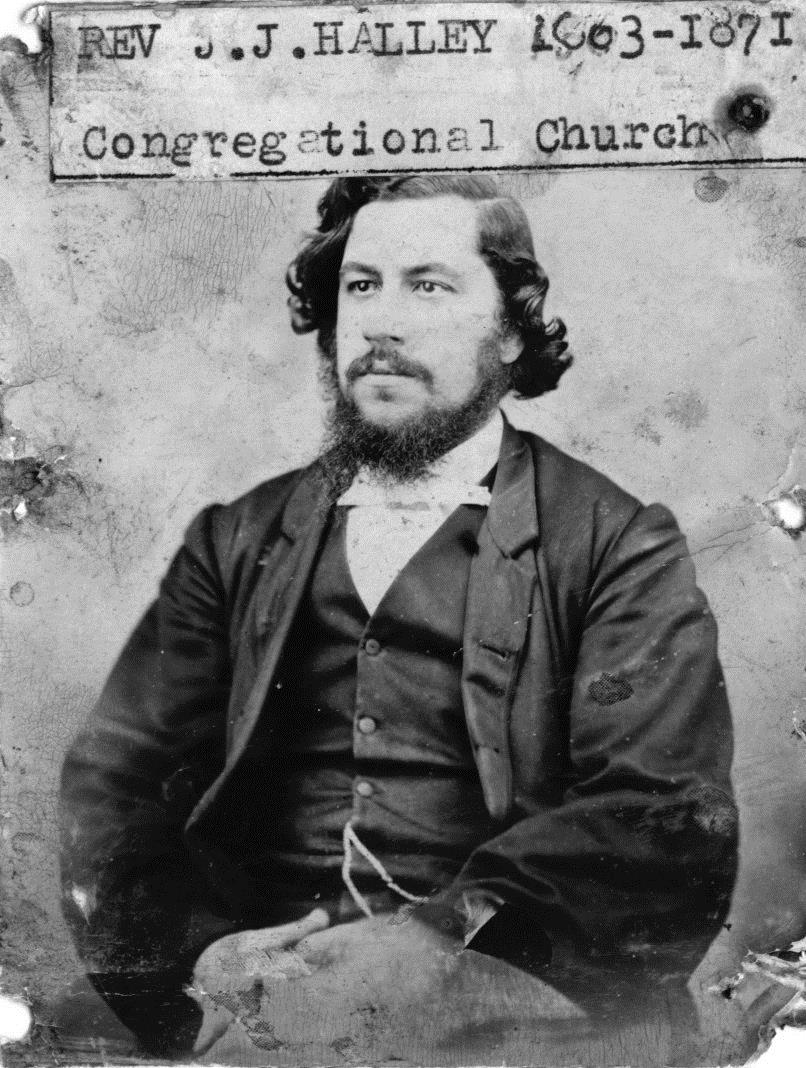
Black and white studio photograph of Jacob John Halley, 1871

Rev. Jacob John Halley (1834 – 19 January 1910) was a congressional minister and amateur naturalist. He was the first minister to be appointed to the district of the Lower Darling and Murrumbidgee and completed over 50 years in the public ministry in various locations around Victoria. He was a long-time secretary of the Congregational Union of Victoria and served as chairman from 1907 to 1909. He is also a former president of the Victorian Field Naturalists Club and former vice-president of the Microscopical Society of Victoria. He is the father of noted Australian physician and feminist Gertrude Halley.

== Early life ==
Jacob John Halley was born in London, the son of Robert Halley, an English Congregationalist minister and abolitionist, and his wife Rebecca Sloman Jacob. Halley was born at Highbury College during the time of his father's residence there as classical tutor. After spending his early years in London, his father accepted a commission to Mosley Street Chapel, Manchester. In Manchester, his family became acquainted with the family of Rev. Richard Fletcher, whose daughter Margaret would later become his wife. The Fletcher family relocated to Australia at the request of the Colonial Missionary Society, and a few months later Halley became ill and managed to persuade a doctor to prescribe his own relocation to the warmer climate of Australia.

Arriving in Australia around 1855, he first joined the Fletcher family in St. Kilda before moving to Sydney to work as a businessman. He became a member of Pitt Street Uniting Church and a lay preacher in Sydney. He was one of the earliest members of the YMCA in Sydney. He lived in Yass, New South Wales for a time, and was connected with the Methodist Church there, before returning to Sydney in 1857 to attend the University of Sydney and to study with various ministers in order to become a Reverend. Halley did not graduate from university, but in 1859 he was invited to join the minister at Newtown Congregational Church to assist with preaching and mission services.

== Church career ==
In March 1860, Halley was ordained and appointed as the first minister assigned to the Lower Darling and Murrumbidgee region. His time there was cut short due to illness, and he returned to St. Kilda in 1861, preaching in several churches in that area until receiving an invitation from the Maryborough Church. In 1862, Halley married Margaret Fletcher, and the couple remained in Maryborough until 1864, after which they settled in Ballarat with Halley taking over the ministry of the old Congregational Church near the corner of Dawson and Mair streets.

In 1872, they moved back to Melbourne and Halley took over a ministry in Williamstown. At this time, Halley also became secretary of the Congregational Union of Victoria, a position he would hold until 1908 before serving two terms as chairman from 1907 to 1909.

== Scientific career ==
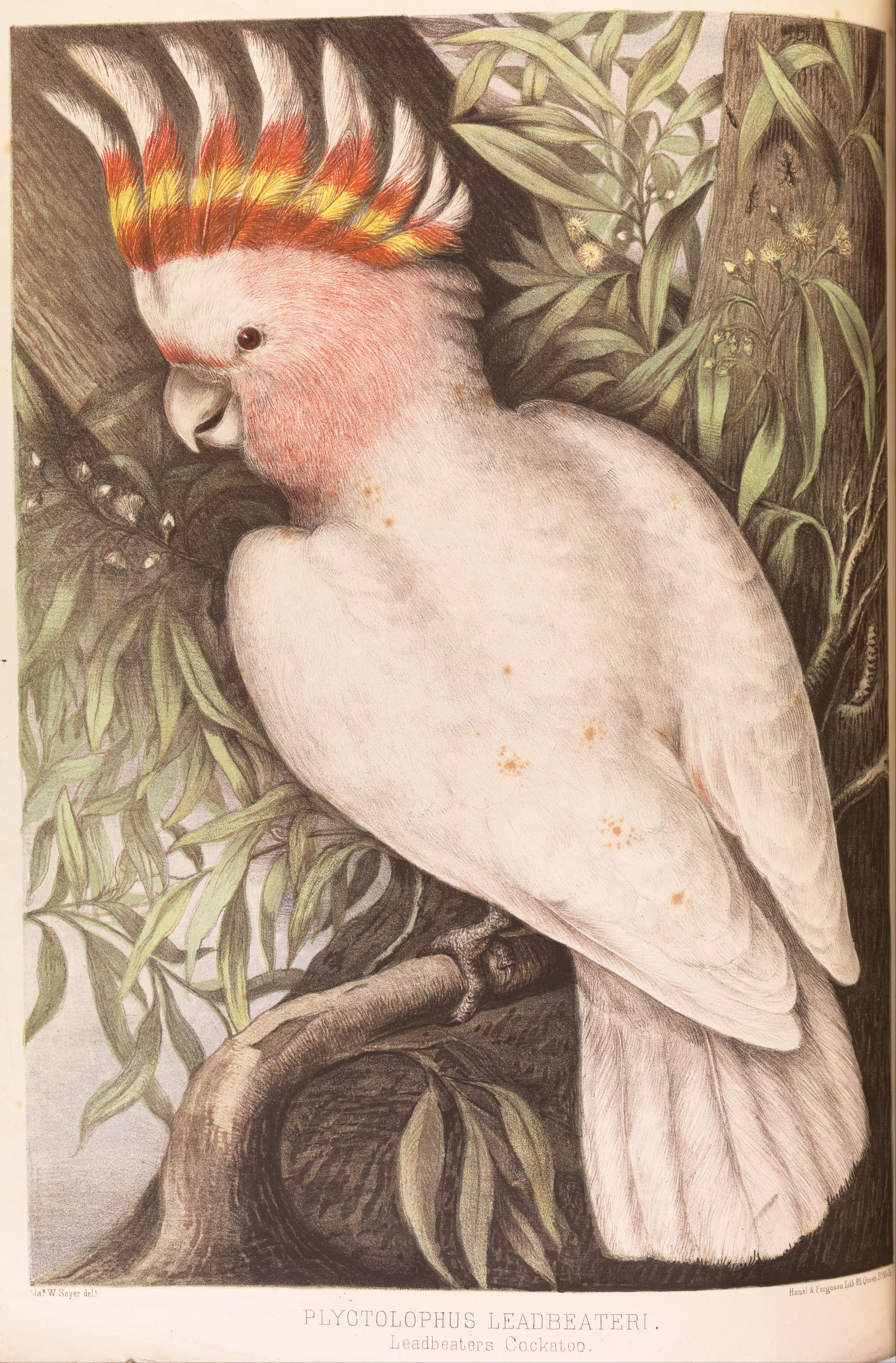
Chromolithograph from A Monograph of the Psittacidae by J.J. Halley

It is said that Halley had a great knowledge of the flora and fauna of Australia. He got his love of ornithology from his wife's brother, Price, who worked on the station where his mission was located while he was assigned to the Lower Darling and Murrumbidgee region, where the two men would go on bird hunting expeditions with Indigenous locals.

In 1871, Halley self-published the beautifully illustrated A Monograph of the Psittacidae or Parrot Family of Australia. The monograph was intended to be a multi-part study, however only one part, including three plates, were published due to financial constraints owing to a lack of subscribers. Only a small number of copies were printed, and of these only four are extant, making it a rare publication.

The three chromolithographed plates are made after original watercolours by James Whitley Sayer, and one is attributed to have been put 'on stone' by Richard Laishley, who was a minister in the Congregational Church and a gifted artist. Laishley exhibited and sold his lithographic illustrations, with accompanying descriptions by Halley, intended for a projected book on the parrots of Australia in the Victorian section at the 1870 Sydney Intercolonial Exhibition. The prints were highly commended by the fine art jurors. Halley was also in correspondence with Silvester Diggles around the time of the publication of Monograph of the Psittacidae.

He was vice-president of the Microscopical Society of Victoria around 1880, and President of the Victorian Field Naturalist's Club from 1884 to 1887. In his presidential address of 1885 Halley advocated for an increase of women in science, and for women to be equal to men in scientific endeavours. Ferdinand von Mueller named the plant Hypsophila halleyana after Halley, the first description of which was published in The Victorian Naturalist, the journal of the Victorian Field Naturalist's Club, towards the end of Halley's run as president of the club.

== Death ==
J.J. Halley died suddenly on a Melbourne tram on 19 January 1910. At the intersection of Flinders Street and William Street he was seen to slump forward. Two policemen carried him to a chemist on Flinders Street and from there he was taken by ambulance to the Melbourne Hospital, but he was dead on arrival. He was on his way to meet his wife and daughter Gertrude at Queen's Wharf to board the SS Loongana to Launceston to attend the Triennial Meetings of the Australasian Council in Hobart.

At the time of his death, Halley lived at 'Greenheys', 119 Mont Albert Road, Mont Albert, which was named after Greenheys, Manchester, where he lived as a young boy. The funeral took place on Friday 21 January at the Congregational Church, Camberwell, and he is buried at Boroondara General Cemetery in Kew.
