= List of dissenting academies (19th century) =

This is a list of dissenting academies in England and Wales operating in the 19th century. Over this period the religious disabilities of English dissenters were lifted within the educational system, and the rationale for the existence of a system of general education parallel to that requiring Church of England beliefs therefore fell away. This provision of general education for dissenters was one of two functions of the academies, the other being the training of ministers (Presbyterian, Congregationalist, Baptist, Methodist and Unitarian). As the century progressed, there were the administrative changes and migrations seen in the 18th century, but also a gradual merging of some of the stronger dissenting academies into the developing university system. Colleges that were in effect nonconformist seminaries could also become theological institutions within universities. By the end of the century the remaining independent "dissenting" system in practical terms had become a network of nonconformist theological colleges.

See List of dissenting academies (1660–1800) for the earlier history. See also List of English and Welsh endowed schools (19th century) for the parallel system of grammar schools.

== List ==
Institution	Dates	Tutors	Students
Spring Hill College, Birmingham. Founded, under the patronage of George Storer Mansfield (1764–1837) and his two sisters Sarah (1767–1853) and Elizabeth (1772–1847), as a seminary for the Congregational ministry in 1838, and closed in 1886 when the institution moved to Mansfield College, Oxford. The old building became Moseley School.	1838–1886	John Massie; Henry Rogers; Thomas Richard Barker.	Robert William Dale
Blackburn Academy. Refounded in Whalley Range, Withington, Lancashire, as Lancashire Independent College in 1843, by George Hadfield, Thomas Raffles and William Roby. Later known as Northern Congregational College.
Cheshunt College. Moved to Cheshunt from Trefeca, Wales.	1792–1906. In 1906 moved to Cheshunt College, Cambridge.	Early presidents were: Isaac Nicholson, Andrew Horne, Richard Owen, Henry Draper, Josiah Richards, John James, William Kemp, Jacob Kirkman Foster. Tutors Joseph Sortain (1838–1850),John Harris (1839–1850); Philip Smith (1840–1850). William Hendry Stowell, president 1850, Henry Robert Reynolds, president 1860–94.	Henry Allon.
Hackney Theological College, a Congregational seminary, going by a number of names (Hoxton Academy, Hackney Academy, Highbury College, but see below). It eventually became part of New College, London.	1803	George Collison
Madras House school, Hackney	1817	John Allen, Alexander Allen	William Smith
Homerton Academy, later merged into New College, London	In operation 1800, merged c.1840.
Idle, became Airedale Independent College in 1826. From 1834 in Undercliffe, and from 1877 in Bradford. In 1888 Rotherham and Airedale became Yorkshire United College, Bradford.	1800–1888	William Vint, tutor from 1795; William Benton Clulow; Andrew Martin Fairbairn, principal 1877 to 1886. Robert Harley.	Charles Albert Berry, John Kelly, John Waddington.
Manchester Academy; then in York, Manchester again, London, and Oxford. Became Harris Manchester College, Oxford.	Operating in 1800.
New College London. It was a Congregational academy formed by the amalgamation of the final form of Daventry Academy as Coward College, Highgate Academy, and Homerton College.	1850–1900. In 1900 it became part of the University of London,	John Harris, Robert Halley.
Cavendish College, in Manchester, became Nottingham Congregational Institute in 1863. The founder Joseph Parker withdrew after a quarrel in the very early stages (1860–1) and John Brown Paton became principal; John Radford Thomson was also on the teaching staff. In 1921 it became Paton Congregational College.
Penryn, Cornwall	1800–1820	Richard Cope	Thomas Byrth, John Nichols Thom.
Rotherham Independent Academy	Opened 1795	Edward Williams to 1813.
Stepney Academy, became ultimately Regent's Park College, Oxford	1810	A Baptist foundation, growing out of the Baptist Education Society (1804) set up in London by Abraham Booth and others.
