= Henry Rogers (congregationalist) =

English nonconformist minister and man of letters

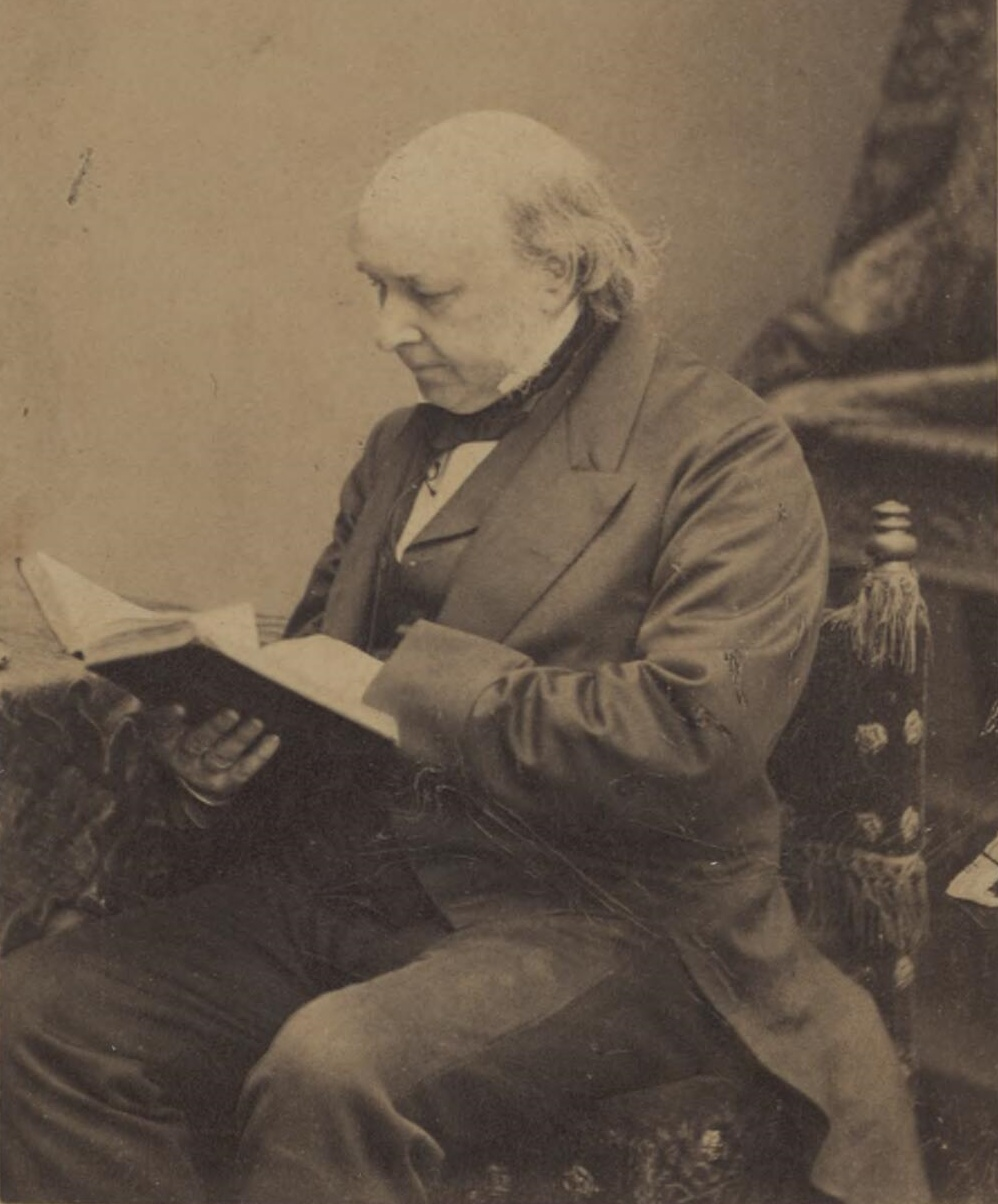
- Christian Non-Conformist, writer and apologist
- Born: 18 October 1806; St Albans, Hertfordshire, U.K.
- Died: 20 August 1877 (aged 70); Pennal Tower, Machynlleth, U.K.
- Education: Highbury College, Middlesex, London

Henry Rogers (1806–1877) was an English nonconformist minister and man of letters, known as a Christian apologist.

== Life ==
He was third son of Thomas Rogers, a surgeon of St Albans, where he was born on 18 October 1806. He was educated at private schools and by his father, of congregationalist views. Aged 16 he was apprenticed to a surgeon at Milton-next-Sittingbourne, Kent; reading John Howe's The Redeemer's Tears wept over Lost Souls diverted his attention from surgery to theology. After study at Highbury College, Middlesex, he entered the congregationalist ministry in June 1829.

His first duty was that of assistant pastor of the church at Poole, Dorset. In 1832, he returned to Highbury College as lecturer on rhetoric and logic. In 1836 he was appointed to the chair of English language and literature at University College, London, which in 1839 he exchanged for that of English literature and language, mathematics and mental philosophy in Spring Hill College, Birmingham. That post he held for nearly twenty years. An incurable throat problem compelled him to abandon preaching.

In 1858, Rogers succeeded to the presidency of the Lancashire Independent College, with which he held the chair of theology until 1871. His health failing, he retired to Silverdale, Morecambe Bay; in 1873 he moved to Pennal Tower, Machynlleth, where he died on 20 August 1877. His remains were interred in St. Luke's Churchyard, Cheetham Hill, Manchester.

== Works ==
In 1826, Rogers published a volume of verse, Poems Miscellaneous and Sacred; and at Poole he began to write for the nonconformist periodical press. On his return to London, he contributed introductory essays to editions of Joseph Truman's Discourse of Natural and Moral Impotency, the works of Jonathan Edwards, Jeremy Taylor (1834–35), and Edmund Burke (1836–37) and Robert Boyle's Treatises on the High Veneration Man's Intellect owes to God, on Things above Reason, and on the Style of the Holy Scriptures. In 1836 he issued his first major work, The Life and Character of John Howe (London), of which later editions appeared in 1863; 1874; and 1879.

In 1837 Rogers edited, under the title The Christian Correspondent, a classified collection of 423 private letters "by eminent persons of both sexes, exemplifying the fruits of holy living and the blessedness of holy dying", London, 3 vols. In October 1839 he began, with an article on The Structure of the English Language, a long connection with the Edinburgh Review which proved to be durable. In 1850 two volumes of selected Essays contributed to it were published, and a third in 1855. Augmented, these miscellanies were reprinted at London in 1874 as Essays, Critical and Biographical, contributed to the "Edinburgh Review," 2 vols., and Essays on some Theological Controversies, chiefly contributed to the "Edinburgh Review."

In 1852 Rogers issued anonymously, as "by F. B.", his best-known work The Eclipse of Faith, or a Visit to a Religious Sceptic, a dialogue in which the sceptic (Harrington) plays the part of remorseless critic of the various forms of rationalism then prevalent. In the course of three years it passed through six editions. From Francis William Newman, who figured in its pages in thin disguise, it elicited a Reply, to which Rogers rejoined in Defence of "The Eclipse of Faith," London, 1854 (3rd edit. 1860).

To the Encyclopædia Britannica (8th edit.) Rogers contributed the articles on Bishop Butler (1854), Gibbon, Hume, and Robert Hall (1856), Pascal and Paley (1859), and Voltaire (1860). He edited the works of John Howe, which appeared at London in 1862–3, 6 vols. He contributed to Good Words and the British Quarterly (his articles were mostly reprinted).

As a Christian apologist Rogers was influenced by Joseph Butler. His last work was The Supernatural Origin of the Bible inferred from itself (the Congregational Lecture for 1873), London, 1874, (8th edit. 1893). Two volumes of imaginary letters were entitled Selections from the Correspondence of R. E. H. Greyson, Esq. (the pseudonym being an anagram for his own name), London, 1857; 3rd edit. 1861.

Besides the works mentioned above, Rogers also published:

- General Introduction to a Course of Lectures on English Grammar and Composition, 1837.
- Essay on the Life and Genius of Thomas Fuller; reprinted from the Edinburgh Review in the "Travellers' Library", vol. xv. 1856.
- A Sketch of the Life and Character of the Rev. A. C. Simpson, LL.D.; reprinted from the British Quarterly Review, 1867.
- Essays from Good Words, 1867.
- Essay introductory to a new edition of Lord Lyttelton's Observations on the Conversion of St. Paul, 1868.

Some articles are also understood to be his work: in the Edinburgh Review, "Religious Movement in Germany" (January 1846), Marriage with the Sister of a Deceased Wife (April 1853), Macaulay's Speeches (October 1854); and in the British Quarterly Review, Servetus and Calvin (May 1849), Systematic Theology (January 1866), Nonconformity in Lancashire (July 1869).

Rogers's portrait and a memoir by Robert William Dale were prefixed to the eighth edition of the 'Superhuman Origin of the Bible, 1893.

== Family ==
Rogers married four times:

1. In 1830, to Sarah Frances, eldest daughter of Isaac Wimett of Chantum, a relative of Jeremy Bentham, who died soon after giving birth to her third child;
2. In November 1834, to her sister, Elizabeth, who died in the autumn of the following year, after giving birth to her first child. As the law then stood his second marriage was not ab initio void, but only voidable by an ecclesiastical tribunal.
3. In 1842, to Emma, daughter of John Watson, of Finsbury Square, London. She also died in giving birth to her first child.
4. In 1857, to Jane, eldest daughter of Samuel Fletcher, of Manchester; she died in 1891, having endowed scholarships in her husband's memory at the Lancashire Independent College and the Owens College, Manchester.
