= John Leifchild =

English Congregational minister and writer

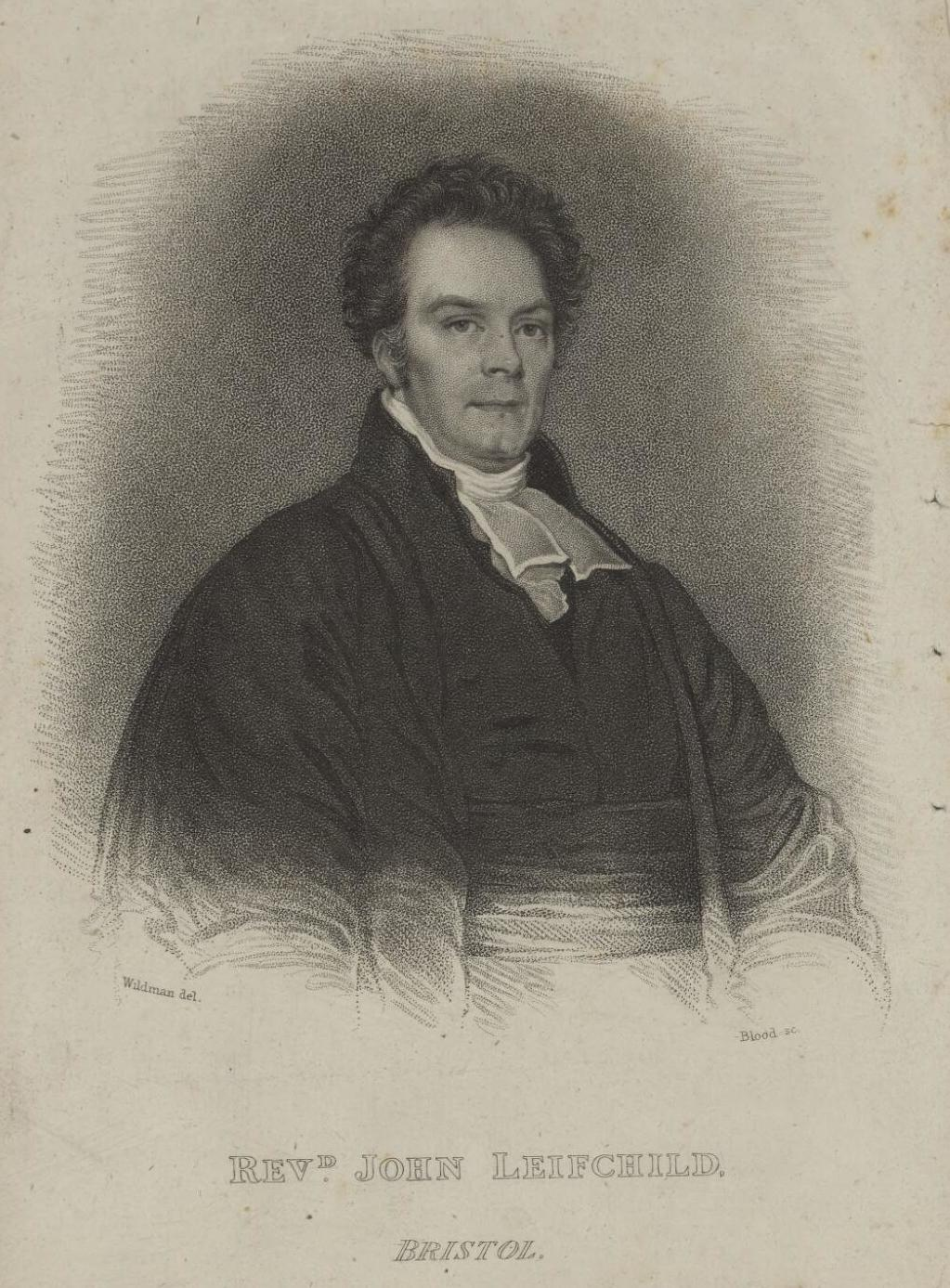
Portrait of Revd. John Leifchild, Bristol

John Leifchild (1780–1862) was an English Congregational minister and writer.

== Life ==
The son of John Leifchild by his wife Sarah Bockman, he was born at Barnet, Hertfordshire, 15 February 1780. He was educated at Barnet grammar school, and from 1795 to 1797 worked with a cooper at St. Albans. From 1804 to 1808 he was a student at Hoxton Academy.

From 1808 to 1824 Leifchild was minister of the Independent chapel in Hornton Street, Kensington, London; from 1824 to 1830 minister of the church in Bridge Street, Bristol; and from 1831 to 1854 at Craven Chapel, Bayswater, London, where he was a successful preacher. He formally retired from the ministry in 1854; but for a little more than one year, 1854-6, he preached at Queen's Square Chapel, Brighton. He died at 4 Fitzroy Terrace, Gloucester Road North, Regent's Park, London, on 29 June 1862, and was buried in Abney Park Cemetery, Stoke Newington.

== Works ==
Leifchild was author of:

- The Case of Children of Religious Parents considered, and the Duties of Parents and Children enforced, 1827.
- A Christian Antidote to Unreasonable Fears at the present, in reply to the Speech of W. Thorp against Catholic Emancipation, 1829.
- A Help to the Private and Domestic Reading of the Holy Scriptures, an arrangement of the books of the Old and New Testament in chronological order, 1829.
- Abbreviated Discourses on Various Subjects, 1833.
- Memoir of the late Rev. J. Hughes, M.A., 1835; on Joseph Hughes.
- Sermons, being a second edition of Abbreviated Discourses on Various Subjects, 1835.
- Observations on Providence in relation to the World and the Church, 1836.
- The Plain Christian guarded against some popular Errors respecting the Scriptures, 1841.
- Original Hymns, edited by J. L., 1842; another edit. 1843.
- Directions for the right and profitable Reading of the Scriptures, 1842.
- Christian Union, or Suggestions for Promoting Brotherly Love among the various Denominations of Evangelical Protestants, 1844.
- The Sabbath-day Book, or Scriptural Meditations for every Lord's Day in the Year, 1846.
- Hymns appropriated to Christian Union, selected and original, 1846.
- The Christian Emigrant, containing Observations on different Countries, with Essays, Discourses, Meditations, and Prayers, 1849.
- Christian Experience, in its several Parts and Stages, 1852.
- Remarkable Facts, illustrative and confirmatory of different portions of Scripture, 1867. The sixth edition was entitled Brief Expositions of Scripture illustrated by Remarkable Facts. 1879.

Leifchild also printed addresses, lectures, and single sermons, and with the Rev. George Redford edited The Evangelist, a monthly magazine, from May 1837 to June 1839.

== Family ==
Leifchild's first wife died in 1804, and he married secondly, 4 June 1811, Elizabeth, daughter of John Stormonth, a surgeon in India; she died at Brighton 28 December 1855, aged 78. The sculptor Henry Stormonth Leifchild was his nephew.

== Notes ==
Attribution

This article incorporates text from a publication now in the public domain: Lee, Sidney, ed. (1892). "Leifchild, John". Dictionary of National Biography. Vol. 32. London: Smith, Elder & Co.
