= Gertrude Halley =

Australian physician and feminist (1867–1939)

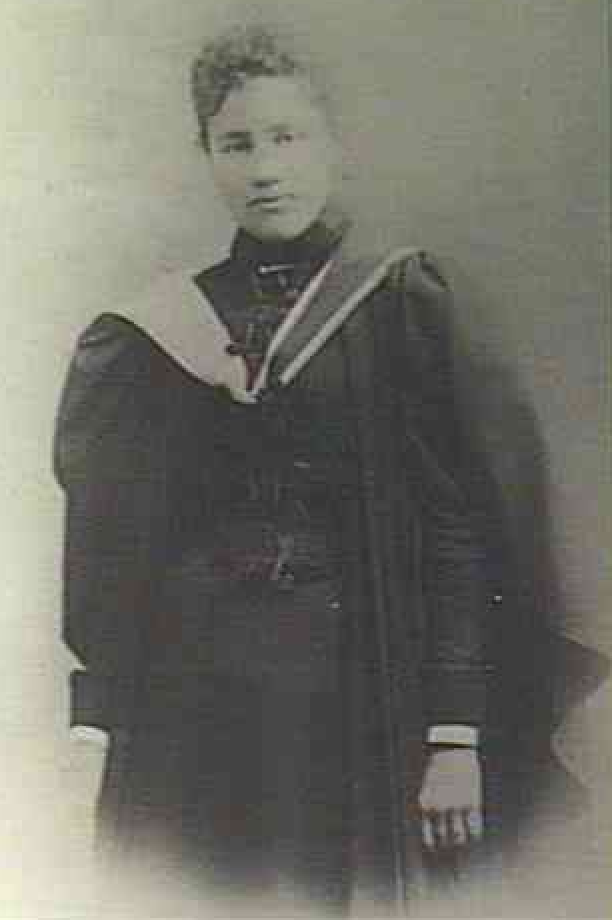
- Born: Ida Gertrude Margaret Halley; 1 August 1867
- Died: 1 October 1939 (aged 72); Maylands, South Australia
- Education: Presbyterian Ladies' College, Melbourne, University of Melbourne
- Medical career
- Profession: Medical practitioner

Ida Gertrude Margaret Halley (1 August 1867 – 1 October 1939), generally known as Gertrude Halley, was an Australian physician and feminist, noted for her work in eye and ear surgery.

== Early life and education ==
Gertrude was a daughter of Margaret Halley (c. 1838 – 24 December 1929) and the Rev. J. J. Halley. She was educated at the Presbyterian Ladies' College, Melbourne and Melbourne University. She was engaged in medical research in London and Shanghai, before returning to Melbourne, where she entered private practice in partnership with Dr. Kent Hughes.

== Career ==
Halley was a founder and the first treasurer of the Queen Victoria Hospital, Melbourne. In 1906 she helped found a medical inspection section for the Education Department in Tasmania, the first in Australia, and a similar organization in New South Wales, then in 1913 established the schools medical service in South Australia, where she started with a staff of two nurses. After twelve years she was appointed Principal Medical Officer with the Education Department with a staff of five medical inspectors, four nurses, three dentists and later, a psychologist.

Halley was a prominent member of the Women's Non-Party Political Association, a South Australian organization founded in 1909, which later became the League of Women Voters. Halley chaired the League from 1916 to 1922 and played an active role in motivating women in social and political spheres. In 1920 she was one of the founders of the South Australian branch of the National Council of Women, serving on its committee for the initial ten years. She was a regular worshipper at the Clayton Congregational Church and a member of the League of Loyal Women during the Great War, and its chairman for many years.

== Death and legacy ==
She died at her residence "Greenhey" or "Greenhays", 24 Wellington-road, Maylands, South Australia. She had two sisters: Enid Una Halley, who married George Coghill on 25 November 1896, and Ethel Halley, a longtime missionary in China.

Halley Street, in the Canberra suburb of Chisholm, is named in her honour. She was posthumously inducted onto the Victorian Honour Roll of Women in 2007.
