= William Benton Clulow =

English dissenting minister and writer

William Benton Clulow (1802–1882) was an English dissenting minister, tutor and writer.

== Life ==
Clulow was a native of Leek, Staffordshire, and, after receiving a preliminary education in the grammar school there, entered Hoxton Academy. He became pastor of the congregational church at Shaldon, Devonshire, where he stayed for twelve years.

In 1835 he accepted an invitation to the classical tutorship of Airedale College, Bradford; he withdrew from the post in 1843, his views being at variance with those of some influential supporters of the institution. After living at Bradford for forty years he retired to Leek, where he died on 16 April 1882.

== Works ==
His works are:

- ‘Truths in Few Words.’
- ‘Aphorisms and Reflections, a miscellany of thought and opinion,’ London, 1843.
- ‘Sunshine and Shadows, or Sketches of Thought Philosophic and Religious,’ London, 1863, 1877, 1883.
- ‘Essays of a Recluse, or Traces of Thought, Literature, and Fancy,’ London, 1865.
