= Mackennal =

Mackennal is a surname. Notable people with the surname include:

- Alexander Mackennal (1835–1904), British Nonconformist minister
- Bertram Mackennal (1863–1931), Australian sculptor
- Horace Mackennal (died 1949), Australian architect
