= William Linwood =

Rev. William Linwood M.A., M.R.A.S. (1817 – 7 September 1878) was an English classical scholar.

== Career overview ==
He was born in Birmingham, the only son of William Linwood, a merchant, and his wife, Mary Iliffe. Linwood was educated at Birmingham grammar school, and at Christ Church, Oxford, where he matriculated in 1835, and graduated B.A. in 1839, and M.A. in 1842. He was student of his college from 1837 to 1851. In 1836 he gained the Hertford, Ireland, and Craven scholarships, and in 1839 obtained a first-class in classics and the Boden scholarship. He took orders, and was for some time assistant-master at Shrewsbury School. In 1850 he was public examiner at Oxford. Linwood was described as using ancient Greek like a vernacular tongue, and as being able to compose any number of Euripidean verses impromptu.

He died in 1878.

== Reputation ==
William Tuckwell wrote of Linwood:

He was a rough, shabby fellow when I remember him, living in London, and coming up to examine in the Schools, where he used to scandalise his colleagues by proposing that for the adjudication of Classes they should "throw into the fire all that other rubbish, and go by the Greek Prose." It was said of him that somewhat late in life, reading St. Paul's Epistles for the first time, and asked by Gaisford what he thought of them, he answered "that they contained a good deal of curious matter, but the Greek was execrable."

Henry Charles Beeching's account of Linwood:

Linwood is forgotten now, but he was a character in his day. "My dear boy," he said once, as he corrected a piece of Greek prose — "my dear boy, you have been reading the Greek Testament again; I wish you wouldn't."

== Works ==
- Four Sermons on the Catholic Church (1841).
- A Lexicon to Æschylus (1843).
- Æschyli Eumenides (1844).
- Suggestions for the Improvement of Greek and Latin Prose Composition (1845).
- Remarks on the Present State of Classical Scholarship and Distinctions in the University of Oxford (1845).
- Sophoclis Tragœdiæ (1846).
- Anthologia Oxoniensis (1846).
- A Treatise on Greek Tragic Metres, with the choric parts of Sophocles metrically arranged (1855).
- Remarks and Emendations on some Passages in Thucydides (1860).
- De Conjecturæ Ope in Novi Testamenti Emendatione Admittenda (1866).
- Remarks on Conjectural Emendation, as applied to the New Testament (1873).
- The Theban Trilogy of Sophocles (1878).

== Notes ==
- Wroth, Warwick William (1893). "Linwood, William" . In Lee, Sidney (ed.). Dictionary of National Biography. Vol. 33. London: Smith, Elder & Co.
