= John Harris (college head) =

English Congregational minister and author

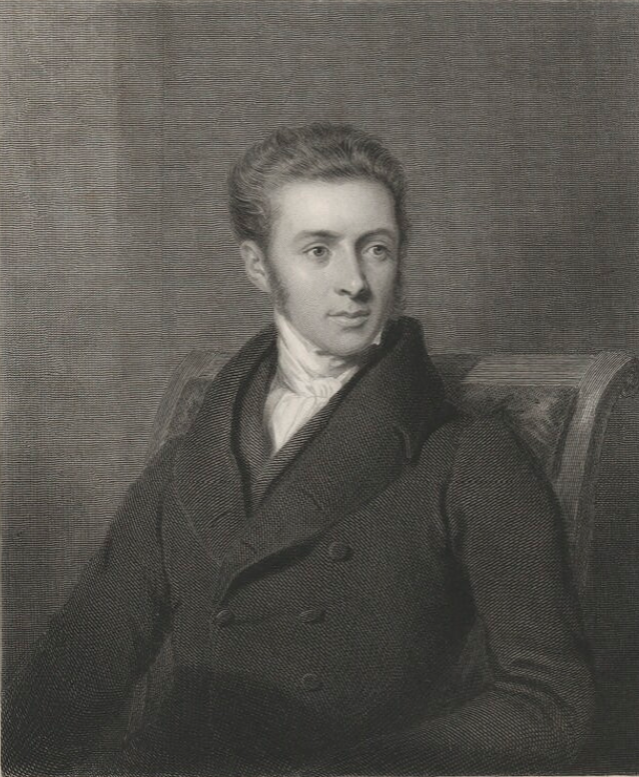
John Harris

John Harris (8 March 1802 – 21 December 1856), English Congregational minister, Christian essayist and author, became the first Principal of New College, St John’s Wood, London.

== Early life ==
John Harris, eldest son of a tailor and draper, was born at Ugborough, Devonshire in 1802. In 1815 his family moved to Bristol where he was employed in his father’s shop by day, and studied in the evenings for self-improvement. His penchant for learning enabled him to be offered a number of engagements through the Bristol Itinerant Society, as a ‘boy preacher’ invited to speak at small local village chapels around Bristol. This self-education was supplemented for a time by the tutorship of Rev Walter Scott of Rowell, and by 1823 he had made sufficient progress to be accepted as a student of theology at a dissenting academy near London – the Hoxton Academy or Independent College, Hoxton.

== Life as a pastor and author ==
After just two years he was invited to become pastor to a congregational church at Epsom. Some ten years later, in 1835, he began to write, and his first publication The Great Teacher was printed. Discovering a talent for writing, he entered an essay on the ‘sinfulness of covetness’ into a publishing competition, and won. He gained 100 guineas for the winning entry and it was published, selling more than 100,000 copies. Though now established as a popular writer, his words developed his own independent ideas which offended some theologians; two of whom (Rev. James Ellaby and the Rev. Algernon Sydney Thelwall) were sufficiently upset to publish a condemnatory reply. Nonetheless, his literary style continued to have popular appeal, especially in the USA. His publication in 1837 of a book supporting the claims of seamen to the regard of the Christian world, won a prize from the British and Foreign Sailor’s Society. Similarly, his essay on Christian missionary work, published in 1842, won a prize; indeed it was very substantial amount – some two hundred guineas. Frequently called upon to write, he contributed to several congregational and evangelical magazines, and became one of the editors of the Biblical Review.

== Academic ==
In 1837 John Harris was appointed Chair of Theology at Cheshunt College. Next year he married Mary Anne Wrangham and was awarded a Diploma of Doctor of Divinity from Brown University in the USA.

In 1850 when three Independent Congregational Colleges in the neighbourhood of London - Highbury, Homerton, and Coward - were amalgamated to form New College London, he was appointed Principal of the new institution. He took up this position from 1851 until his death, serving also as Professor of Theology at the college. Of his educational approach and style, it has been said that ‘’he sought to infuse a more genial and humane spirit into the dry dogmas of theology, and to urge Christians to reduce their belief to practice’’ (Smith, Sidney, ed. 1891). In 1852 he became Chairman of the Congregational Union of England and Wales.

== Death and memorial ==
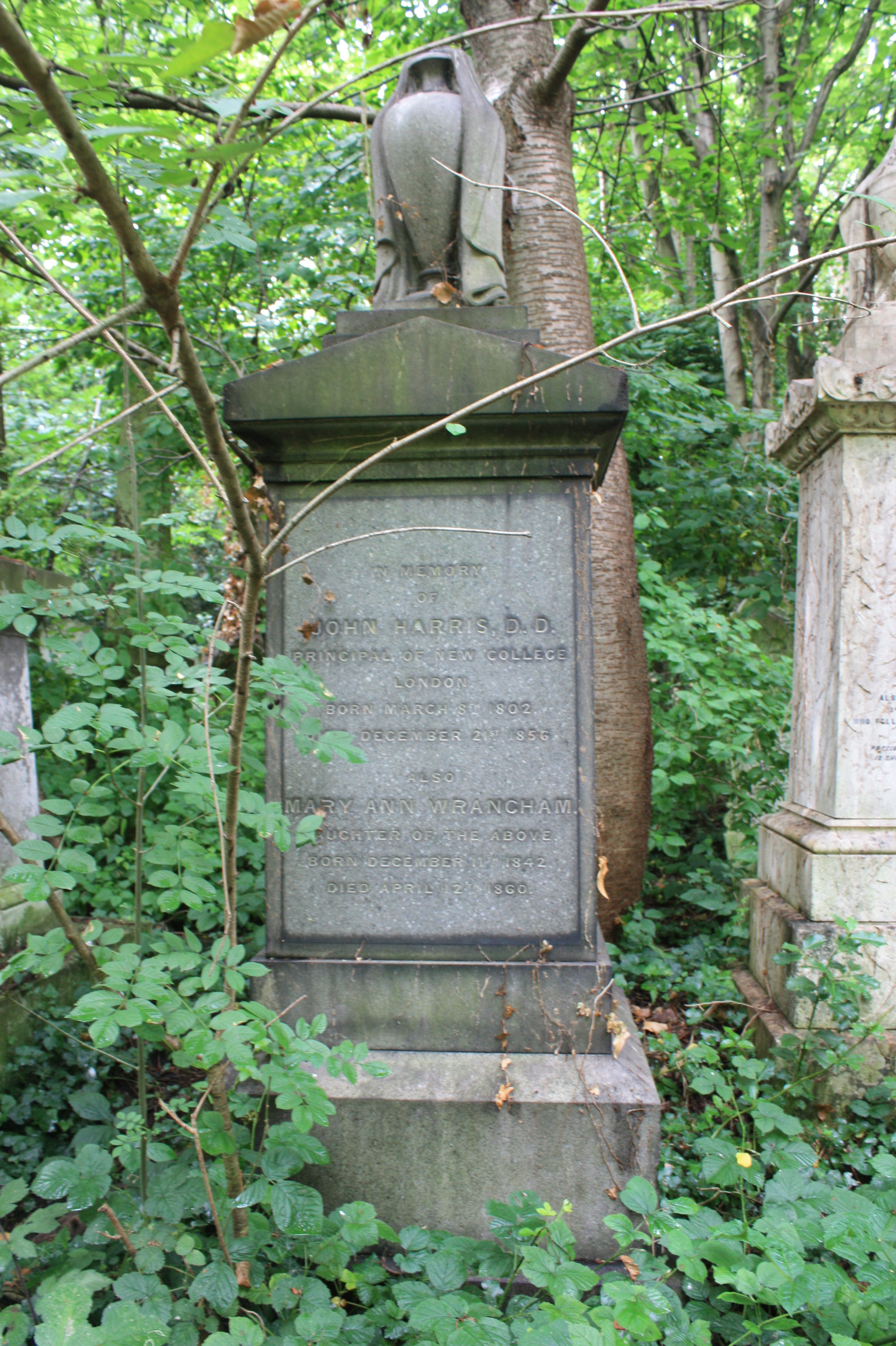
John Harris's grave, Abney Park Cemetery, London

John Harris died in middle age (age 54) at the college, due to a bacterial infection Pyaemia. Such 'bloodpoisoning' was almost universally fatal before the introduction of antibiotics. He was succeeded as Principal of the College by Robert Halley. Today John Harris' tall grey polished granite memorial stone stands in Dr Watt’s Walk (the main central path to the south), Abney Park Cemetery, Hackney, London. His wife, Mary Ann Wrangham, joined him in 1860.

== Selected publications ==
- Smith, Rev. Philip, ed. (1857): Posthumous Works of Rev. John Harris
- Harris, John (1835): The Great Teacher: Characteristics of Our Lord's Ministry
- Harris, John (1847): The Pre-Adamite Earth
- Harris, John (1849): Man Primeval, Or, The Constitution and Primitive Condition of the Human Being
- Harris, John (1851): The Inspiration of the Scriptures: introductory lectures at the opening of New College, 1851
