= William Vint =

English dissenting minister and author

William Vint (1768–1834) was an English congregationalist minister and dissenting academy tutor.

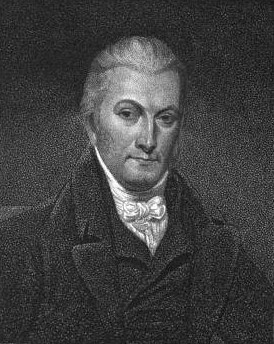
William Vint, 1819 engraving

== Life ==
Vint was born at High Thrunton, near Whittingham, Northumberland, on 1 November 1768. He was educated at Alnmouth and at Warrenford grammar school. About the age of 15 he was placed under the tuition of Samuel Walker, minister at Northowram, with whom he studied theology. He soon became known as a preacher, and on 25 December 1790 was appointed minister at Idle in Yorkshire.

In 1795 the academy at Northowram was dissolved, and several of the students were temporarily placed with Vint, who taught them theology. Edward Hanson of London then worked to set up a regular academy at Idle; it began in a small way in 1800, and Vint, the only tutor, at first only took on four pupils. The establishment prospered, and on 21 June 1826 it became known as Airedale Independent College. Vint continued to direct it until his last illness, when on 5 March 1834 it moved locally to Undercliffe.

Besides acting as tutor to Airedale College, Vint was minister of Idle till his death there on 13 March 1834. He was buried in the graveyard of the chapel.

== Works ==
A press was established at Idle in 1824 under the management of his brother, John Vint, at which Vint's 17 publications were printed. Besides sermons, he was the author of:

- Strictures on Mr. Morison's Discourse on the Millennium, 1829. Against John Morison.
- An Enquiry into the Origin of Opinions relative to an Expected Millennium, 1830.

He edited:

- Life and Works of Oliver Heywood, 1827–5, 5 vols.
- Illustrations of Prophecy by Joseph Lomas Towers, 1828, 2 vols.
- The Suffering Christian's Companion, a selection of discourses, 1830.
- The Active Christian's Companion, 1830.
- The Privileged Christian's Companion, 1830.
- Jonathan Edwards, Humble Attempt to promote Explicit Agreement and Visible Union of God's People in extraordinary Prayer for the Revival of Religion, 1831.
- A Selection of Hymns, 3rd edit. 1834.

== Family ==
Vint married Sarah Sharp of Idle, who died on 5 November 1855. By her he left six sons and two daughters.

== Notes ==
Attribution

This article incorporates text from a publication now in the public domain: Lee, Sidney, ed. (1899). "Vint, William". Dictionary of National Biography. Vol. 58. London: Smith, Elder & Co.
