= The Eclectic Review =

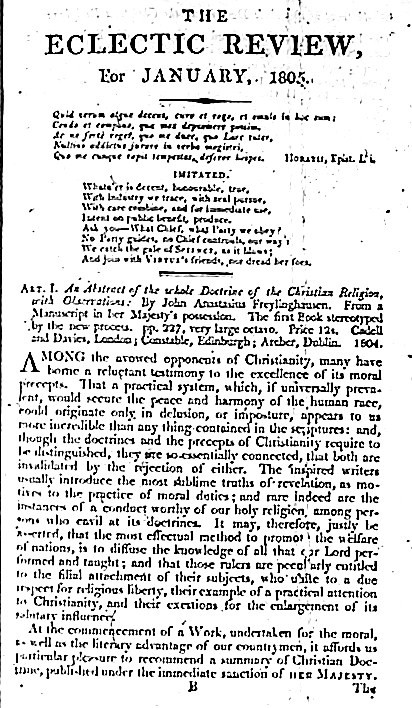
First page of the first issue of The Eclectic Review

The Eclectic Review was a British periodical published monthly during the first half of the 19th century aimed at highly literate readers of all classes. Published between 1805 and 1868, it reviewed books in many fields, including literature, history, theology, politics, science, art, and philosophy. The Eclectic paid special attention to literature, reviewing major new Romantic writers such as William Wordsworth and Lord Byron as well as emerging Victorian novelists such as Charles Dickens. Unlike their fellow publications, however, they also paid attention to American literature, seriously reviewing the works of writers such as Washington Irving.

Although the Eclectic was founded by Dissenters, it adhered to a strict code of non-denominationalism; however, its religious background may have contributed to its serious intellectual tone. Initially modeled on 18th-century periodicals, the Eclectic adapted early to the competitive periodical market of the early 19th century, changing its style to include longer, more evaluative reviews. It remained a generally successful periodical for most of its run.

The editing history of the Eclectic can be divided into four periods: the first is dominated by co-founder Daniel Parken, who helped establish the popularity of the periodical; after Parken's death, Josiah Conder, after purchasing the periodical, edited it from 1813 until 1836, during years of financial hardship; from 1837 to 1855, Thomas Price edited the periodical, returning it to its popularity and success; in its final years, several people served as managing editor and the Eclectic had some of its best years. Although few of the contributors of the Eclectic remain famous today, such as the poet James Montgomery, many of them were well-known academics or reformers of the time, such as the abolitionist George Thompson and the theological scholar Adam Clarke.

== Founding and competition ==
Modeled on 18th-century periodicals such as the Monthly Review and The Critical Review, issues of the Eclectic Review typically included several long reviews in addition to many short notices. Its long reviews included both "review articles", which reviewed several books on the same subject, and "review essays", which used a single book as a way to begin discussing a larger subject of interest. However, unlike its 18th-century models, the Eclectic was able to successfully compete in the early 19th-century market, with the Edinburgh Review, the Quarterly Review, and the Westminster Review. As James Basker explains in his short history of the Eclectic, the Edinburgh Review was its "most illustrious and its most antagonistic rival", and like it, the Eclectic "offered sophisticated criticism that moved almost completely away from the old-fashioned techniques of quotation and abstract toward a genuine critical evaluation of books and their significance in the broader contexts both of the author's canon and of their formal or intellectual tradition". Basker writes that "the Eclectic grew to become what is now a massive and invaluable archive of the literary and intellectual history of the nineteenth century".

The Eclectic was founded on but not dominated by nonconformist principles. Unlike most periodicals at the time, it was a non-profit publication. From its foundation, all profits were donated to the British and Foreign Bible Society. The religious affiliation of the periodical, while non-denominational, may have affected its content. Basker speculates that its religious foundations are connected to its "high proportion of serious intellectual discussion and rather less than usual treatment of lighter literary from such as drama and the novel".

== Editors and contributors ==
The publishing history of the Eclectic can be divided into four periods. During its first year, the periodical was edited by Samuel Greatheed, a Dissenting minister; however, it was co-founder and fellow Dissenter Daniel Parken who built up the readership and contributor list of the periodical while he served as editor from 1806 to 1812. He was also responsible for what Basker calls "the policy of enlightened, non-denominational (if not ecumenical) editorial policies" at the Eclectic. After Parken's death in 1812, Theophilus Williams took over editorship of the periodical. It almost collapsed until it was purchased by Josiah Conder in 1813, with whom the second major period began. Conder continued editing the periodical until 1836, financing it himself and often writing entire issues. From 1837 until 1855—the third period—Thomas Price edited the periodical (with the exception of one three-month period when William Linwood tried to take over the editorship). According to Basker, "Price reinvigorated the Eclectic", specifically by rigorously adhering to a neutral position on religion, by expanding the topics covered to include foreign publications, and by lowering the price from two shillings to eighteen pence. His aim was to appeal to families. As his health declined, Price co-edited with William Hendry Stowell from 1851 to 1855 and during 1855 with his successor, Jonathan Edwards Ryland. The last period of the Eclectic's history, described by Basker as its "most unstable", began with Price's departure. An anonymous editor took over from Ryland and changed the Eclectic into a miscellany. Edwin Paxton Hood took over as editor in January 1861, changing the periodical back to a book review, increasing the size of each issue, and lowering the price still further. According to Basker, these last years were successful and the periodical produced "some of its finest review journalism".

About 60 of the contributors to the Eclectic have been identified. Basker writes that "few...were particularly famous, even in their own day". Only two or three are still notable today: James Mill, the father of philosopher John Stuart Mill; the poet and friend of Lord Byron, James Montgomery; and man of letters, Edwin Paxton Hood. However, as Basker points out "although the rest may be forgotten today, it is nonetheless true to say (as one of its editors said in the 1830s) that 'the pages of the [Eclectic] have been enriched by the contributions of many of the most powerful intellects of the age'". Among these were the mathematician, scientist, and theologian Olinthus Gilbert Gregory, the theological scholar Adam Clarke, the abolitionist George Thompson, the reformer Andrew Reed, and the theologian, scientist, and philanthropist Thomas Chalmers.

== Audience ==
Basker writes that the Eclectic was "clearly aimed at the highly literate and thoughtful reader" but it was "anything but elitist about the audience it sought". The founders deliberately set a low price so that many classes of people could purchase the journal. Its reviews of family encyclopedias, such Dionysius Lardner's Cabinet Cyclopedia suggest that it was aimed at the lower-middle and lower classes.

William Copeland Astbury wrote in his diary, March 12, 1831, "To the park. Forenoon. Diurnal Economy. To the park... Afternoon. Revised Eclectic Review 'March'"

== Content ==
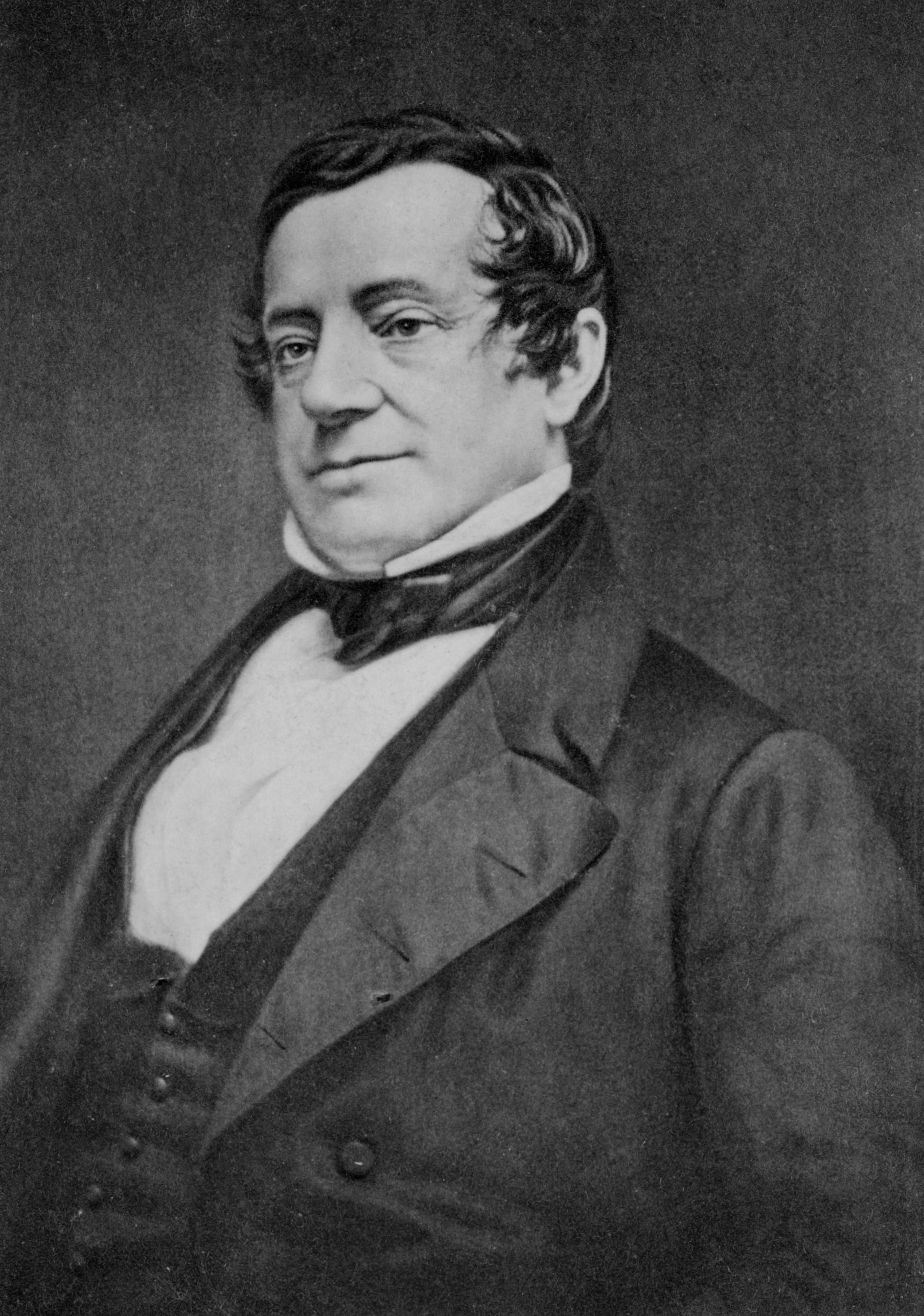
The Eclectic highlighted American literature in its reviews, such as the works of Washington Irving.

The Eclectic reviewed more American literature than any other English periodical of the time. By 1806, it had an entire section dedicated to American literature. As Basker explains, "this continuing attention to American literature was far more than a condescending curiosity about the culture of the young republic. Rather remarkably, even as early as 1810, American authors were accorded the same serious treatment as the major authors in English and other European languages." For example, in 1820 the Eclectic began reviewing Washington Irving's Sketch Book of Geoffrey Crayon, writing that it was "the first purely literary production that has issued from the American press, which could claim to rank, in point of original talent and classic elegance of style, with the best English authors".

However, English authors were still given far more attention than American, and William Wordsworth was the most reviewed of all. Essays were written about the new Romantic movement. In general, the Eclectic preferred Wordsworth to Samuel Taylor Coleridge, particularly after the publication of "Kubla Khan", calling on him "to break off his desultory and luxurious habits, and to brace his mind to intellectual exertion". Percy Bysshe Shelley was criticized for his profanity and atheism, however John Keats was judged to have "promise". After Wordsworth, it was Byron's poetry which was reviewed most often. The Eclectic criticized it, but heralded works such as Childe Harold's Pilgrimage, writing that the reader would "be dazzled even to tears". The major novelists of the time were not neglected. For example, Sir Walter Scott's novels were reviewed, due to their popularity, "but his works were regarded with a certain ambivalence". In reviewing Ivanhoe, for example, the reviewer wrote that it was "one of the cleverest of all our Author's productions" but that it was "a failure" as a romance. Almost all of Charles Dickens's novels were reviewed in the Eclectic, as were novels by the Brontës, William Thackeray, Anthony Trollope, Victor Hugo, and George Eliot. According to Basker, "the Eclectic's treatment of the novel was balanced, insightful, and sophisticated". The Eclectic also reviewed the works of important literary figures such as George Crabbe, Robert Burns, James Hogg, William Hazlitt, Stendhal, and Goethe. It did not shy away from reviewing the works of controversial figures, however, such as Thomas de Quincey. It reviewed the works of both Brownings, calling Elizabeth Barrett Browning "the Schiller of our higher nature" and compared Robert Browning to Tennyson. The Eclectic also claimed to be the first journal to "discover" and "to notice at any length" Christina Rossetti's Goblin Market and Other Poems.

As Basker writes, "beyond literature, the Eclectic covered books in every field imaginable". For example, the January 1845 issue had seven major articles; three were on literary subjects and the rest were on theology, politics, education, and natural history. The Eclectic also reviewed art exhibitions. Furthermore, important contemporary scientific and philosophical subjects were given extensive space. For example, the Oxford Movement was debated and Charles Darwin's On the Origin of Species was reviewed. Basker writes that "in general, over the years the Eclectic showed remarkable tolerance for other religious groups—not only the various denominations of Protestants, but also Roman Catholics and Jews." Moreover, it steadfastly opposed slavery and supported social reform.

== Reception ==
The Eclectic, as its most successful, "enjoyed a wide readership in England, America, and presumably throughout the British Empire", according to Basker. The journal was reprinted in the United States by Foster, Bisbee, and Col. in New York.

== The Eclectic Review online ==
Almost all the issues are available online.

=== First series (1805-1813) ===
- Eclectic Review. Vol. 1, pt 1. January–June 1805. p. 490.
- Eclectic Review. Vol. 1, pt 2. July–December 1805. p. 498.
- Eclectic Review. Vol. 2, pt 1. January–June 1806. p. 484.
- Eclectic Review. Vol. 2, pt 2. July–December 1806. p. 593.
- Eclectic Review. Vol. 3, pt 1. January–June 1807. p. 583.
- Eclectic Review. Vol. 3, pt 2. July–December 1807. p. 579.
- Eclectic Review. Vol. 4, pt 1. July–December 1808. p. 579.
- Eclectic Review. Vol. 4, pt 2. July–December 1808. p. 574.
- Eclectic Review. Vol. 5, pt 1. January–June 1809. p. 586.
- Eclectic Review. Vol. 5, pt 2. July–December 1809. p. 583.
- Eclectic Review. Vol. 6, pt 1. January–June 1810. p. 570.
- Eclectic Review. Vol. 6, pt 2. July–December 1810. p. 592.
- Eclectic Review. Vol. 7, pt 1. January–June 1811.
- Eclectic Review. Vol. 7, pt 2. July–December 1811. p. 571.
- Eclectic Review. Vol. 8, pt 1. January–June 1812. p. 646.
- Eclectic Review. Vol. 8, pt 2. July–December 1812. p. 665.
- Eclectic Review. Vol. 9. January–June 1813. p. 661.
- Eclectic Review. Vol. 10. July–December 1813. p. 653.

=== Second series (1814-1828) ===
- Eclectic Review. Vol. 1. January–June 1814. p. 678.
- Stowell, William Hendry (July–December 1814). Eclectic Review. Vol. 2. p. 664.
- Greatheed, Samuel; Parken, Daniel; Williams, Theophilus; Conder, Josiah; Price, Thomas; Ryland, Jonathan Edwards; Hood, Edwin Paxton (January–June 1815). Eclectic Review. Vol. 3. p. 650.
- Greatheed, Samuel; Parken, Daniel; Williams, Theophilus; Conder, Josiah; Price, Thomas; Ryland, Jonathan Edwards; Hood, Edwin Paxton (July–December 1815). Eclectic Review. Vol. 4. p. 648.
- Stowell, William Hendry (January–June 1816). Eclectic Review. Vol. 5. p. 644.
- Eclectic Review. Vol. 6. July–December 1816. p. 638.
- Greatheed, Samuel; Parken, Daniel; Williams, Theophilus; Conder, Josiah; Price, Thomas; Ryland, Jonathan Edwards; Hood, Edwin Paxton (January–June 1817). Eclectic Review. Vol. 7. p. 630.
- Stowell, William Hendry (July–December 1817). Eclectic Review. Vol. 8. p. 640.
- Greatheed, Samuel; Parken, Daniel; Williams, Theophilus; Conder, Josiah; Price, Thomas; Ryland, Jonathan Edwards; Hood, Edwin Paxton (January–June 1818). Eclectic Review. Vol. 9. p. 644.
- Greatheed, Samuel; Parken, Daniel; Williams, Theophilus; Conder, Josiah; Price, Thomas; Ryland, Jonathan Edwards; Hood, Edwin Paxton (July–December 1818). Eclectic Review. Vol. 10. p. 620.
- Greatheed, Samuel; Parken, Daniel; Williams, Theophilus; Conder, Josiah; Price, Thomas; Ryland, Jonathan Edwards; Hood, Edwin Paxton (January–June 1819). Eclectic Review. Vol. 11. p. 622.
- Stowell, William Hendry (July–December 1819). Eclectic Review. Vol. 12. p. 616.
- Greatheed, Samuel; Parken, Daniel; Williams, Theophilus; Conder, Josiah; Price, Thomas; Ryland, Jonathan Edwards; Hood, Edwin Paxton (January–June 1820). Eclectic Review. Vol. 13. p. 608.
- Greatheed, Samuel; Parken, Daniel; Williams, Theophilus; Conder, Josiah; Price, Thomas; Ryland, Jonathan Edwards; Hood, Edwin Paxton (July–December 1820). Eclectic Review. Vol. 14. p. 606.
- Greatheed, Samuel; Parken, Daniel; Williams, Theophilus; Conder, Josiah; Price, Thomas; Ryland, Jonathan Edwards; Hood, Edwin Paxton (January–June 1821). Eclectic Review. Vol. 15. p. 596.
- Stowell, William Hendry (July–December 1821). Eclectic Review. Vol. 16. p. 587.
- Eclectic Review. Vol. 17. January–June 1822. p. 587.
- Eclectic Review. Vol. 18. July–December 1822. p. 588.
- Eclectic Review. Vol. 19. January–June 1823. p. 587.
- Greatheed, Samuel; Parken, Daniel; Williams, Theophilus; Conder, Josiah; Price, Thomas; Ryland, Jonathan Edwards; Hood, Edwin Paxton (July–December 1823). Eclectic Review. Vol. 20. p. 585.
- Greatheed, Samuel; Parken, Daniel; Williams, Theophilus; Conder, Josiah; Price, Thomas; Ryland, Jonathan Edwards; Hood, Edwin Paxton (January–June 1824). Eclectic Review. Vol. 21. p. 588.
- Eclectic Review. Vol. 22. July–December 1824. p. 585.
- Eclectic Review. Vol. 23. January–June 1825. p. 601.
- Eclectic Review. Vol. 24. July–December 1825. p. 582.
- Greatheed, Samuel; Parken, Daniel; Williams, Theophilus; Price, Thomas; Conder, Josiah; Stowell, William Hendry; Ryland, Jonathan Edwards; Hood, Edwin Paxton (January–June 1826). Eclectic Review. Vol. 25. p. 588.
- Greatheed, Samuel; Parken, Daniel; Williams, Theophilus; Conder, Josiah; Price, Thomas; Ryland, Jonathan Edwards; Hood, Edwin Paxton (July–December 1826). Eclectic Review. Vol. 26. p. 588.
- Eclectic Review. Vol. 27. January–June 1827. p. 588.
- Eclectic Review. Vol. 28. July–December 1827. p. 591.
- Greatheed, Samuel; Parken, Daniel; Williams, Theophilus; Conder, Josiah; Price, Thomas; Ryland, Jonathan Edwards; Hood, Edwin Paxton (January–June 1828). Eclectic Review. Vol. 29. p. 588.
- Eclectic Review. Vol. 30. July–December 1828. p. 588.

=== Third series (1829-1837) ===
- Eclectic Review. Vol. 1. January–June 1829. p. 585.
- Eclectic Review. Vol. 2. July–December 1829. p. 570.
- Eclectic Review. Vol. 3. January–June 1830. p. 580.
- Eclectic Review. Vol. 4. July–December 1830. p. 582.
- Eclectic Review. Vol. 5. January–June 1831. p. 565.
- Eclectic Review. Vol. 6. July–December 1831. p. 569.
- Eclectic Review. Vol. 7. January–June 1832. p. 559.
- Eclectic Review. Vol. 8. July–December 1832. p. 599.
- Eclectic Review. Vol. 9. January–June 1833. p. 524.
- Eclectic Review. Vol. 10. July–December 1833. p. 565.
- Eclectic Review. Vol. 11. January–June 1834. p. 559.
- Eclectic Review. Vol. 12. July–December 1834. p. 561.
- Eclectic Review. Vol. 13. January–June 1835. p. 526.
- Eclectic Review. Vol. 14. July–December 1835. p. 539.
- Eclectic Review. Vol. 15. January–June 1836. p. 530.
- Eclectic Review. Vol. 16. July–December 1836. p. 574.

=== Fourth series (1837-1850) ===
- Eclectic Review. Vol. 1. January–June 1837. p. 626.
- Eclectic Review. Vol. 2. July–December 1837. p. 678.
- Greatheed, Samuel; Parken, Daniel; Williams, Theophilus; Conder, Josiah; Price, Thomas; Ryland, Jonathan Edwards; Hood, Edwin Paxton (January–June 1838). Eclectic Review. Vol. 3. p. 728.
- Greatheed, Samuel; Parken, Daniel; Williams, Theophilus; Conder, Josiah; Price, Thomas; Ryland, Jonathan Edwards; Hood, Edwin Paxton (July–December 1838). Eclectic Review. Vol. 4. p. 736.
- Eclectic Review. Vol. 5. January–June 1839. p. 746.
- Eclectic Review. Vol. 6. July–December 1839. p. 744.
- Greatheed, Samuel; Parken, Daniel; Williams, Theophilus; Conder, Josiah; Price, Thomas; Ryland, Jonathan Edwards; Hood, Edwin Paxton (January–June 1840). Eclectic Review. Vol. 7. p. 734.
- Greatheed, Samuel; Parken, Daniel; Williams, Theophilus; Conder, Josiah; Price, Thomas; Ryland, Jonathan Edwards; Hood, Edwin Paxton (July–December 1840). Eclectic Review. Vol. 8. p. 734.
- Eclectic Review. Vol. 9. January–June 1841. p. 734.
- Eclectic Review. Vol. 10. July–December 1841. p. 614.
- Eclectic Review. Vol. 11. January–June 1842. p. 732.
- Eclectic Review. Vol. 12. July–December 1842. p. 730.
- Eclectic Review. Vol. 13. January–June 1843. p. 730.
- Greatheed, Samuel; Parken, Daniel; Williams, Theophilus; Conder, Josiah; Price, Thomas; Ryland, Jonathan Edwards; Hood, Edwin Paxton (July–December 1843). Eclectic Review. Vol. 14. p. 726.
- Eclectic Review. Vol. 15. January–June 1844. p. 749.
- Greatheed, Samuel; Parken, Daniel; Williams, Theophilus; Conder, Josiah; Price, Thomas; Ryland, Jonathan Edwards; Hood, Edwin Paxton (July–December 1844). Eclectic Review. Vol. 16. p. 754.
- Greatheed, Samuel; Parken, Daniel; Williams, Theophilus; Conder, Josiah; Price, Thomas; Ryland, Jonathan Edwards; Hood, Edwin Paxton (January–June 1845). Eclectic Review. Vol. 17. p. 757.
- Greatheed, Samuel; Parken, Daniel; Williams, Theophilus; Conder, Josiah; Price, Thomas; Ryland, Jonathan Edwards; Hood, Edwin Paxton (July–December 1845). Eclectic Review. Vol. 18. p. 750.
- Greatheed, Samuel; Parken, Daniel; Williams, Theophilus; Price, Thomas; Conder, Josiah; Ryland, Jonathan Edwards; Hood, Edwin Paxton (January–June 1846). Eclectic Review. Vol. 19. p. 774.
- Eclectic Review. Vol. 20. July–December 1846. p. 790.
- Eclectic Review. Vol. 21. January–June 1847. p. 794.
- Greatheed, Samuel; Parken, Daniel; Williams, Theophilus; Conder, Josiah; Price, Thomas; Ryland, Jonathan Edwards; Hood, Edwin Paxton (July–December 1847). Eclectic Review. Vol. 22. p. 782.
- Greatheed, Samuel; Parken, Daniel; Williams, Theophilus; Conder, Josiah; Price, Thomas; Ryland, Jonathan Edwards; Hood, Edwin Paxton (January–June 1848). Eclectic Review. Vol. 23. p. 782.
- Greatheed, Samuel; Parken, Daniel; Williams, Theophilus; Price, Thomas; Conder, Josiah; Hood, Edwin Paxton; Ryland, Jonathan Edwards (July–December 1848). Eclectic Review. Vol. 24. p. 777.
- Greatheed, Samuel; Parken, Daniel; Williams, Theophilus; Price, Thomas; Conder, Josiah; Ryland, Jonathan Edwards; Hood, Edwin Paxton (January–June 1849). Eclectic Review. Vol. 25. p. 797.
- Eclectic Review. Vol. 26. July–December 1849. p. 782.
- Greatheed, Samuel; Parken, Daniel; Williams, Theophilus; Conder, Josiah; Price, Thomas; Ryland, Jonathan Edwards; Hood, Edwin Paxton (January–June 1850). Eclectic Review. Vol. 27. p. 806.
- Greatheed, Samuel; Parken, Daniel; Williams, Theophilus; Conder, Josiah; Price, Thomas; Ryland, Jonathan Edwards; Hood, Edwin Paxton (July–December 1850). Eclectic Review. Vol. 28. p. 777.

=== Fifth series (1851-1856) ===
- Greatheed, Samuel; Parken, Daniel; Williams, Theophilus; Conder, Josiah; Price, Thomas; Ryland, Jonathan Edwards; Hood, Edwin Paxton (January–June 1851). Eclectic Review. Vol. 1. p. 778.
- Eclectic Review. Vol. 2. July–December 1851. p. 792.
- Eclectic Review. Vol. 3. January–June 1852. p. 779.
- Greatheed, Samuel; Parken, Daniel; Williams, Theophilus; Conder, Josiah; Price, Thomas; Ryland, Jonathan Edwards; Hood, Edwin Paxton (July–December 1852). Eclectic Review. Vol. 4. p. 782.
- Greatheed, Samuel; Parken, Daniel; Williams, Theophilus; Conder, Josiah; Price, Thomas; Ryland, Jonathan Edwards; Hood, Edwin Paxton (January–June 1853). Eclectic Review. Vol. 5. p. 774.
- Greatheed, Samuel; Parken, Daniel; Williams, Theophilus; Conder, Josiah; Price, Thomas; Ryland, Jonathan Edwards; Hood, Edwin Paxton (July–December 1853). Eclectic Review. Vol. 6. p. 782.
- Eclectic Review. Vol. 7. January–June 1854. p. 774.
- Eclectic Review. Vol. 8. July–December 1854. p. 773.
- Eclectic Review. Vol. 9. January–June 1855. p. 794.
- Stowell, William Hendry (July–December 1855). Eclectic Review. Vol. 10. p. 774.
- Greatheed, Samuel; Parken, Daniel; Williams, Theophilus; Conder, Josiah; Price, Thomas; Ryland, Jonathan Edwards; Hood, Edwin Paxton (January–June 1856). Eclectic Review. Vol. 11. p. 660.
- Eclectic Review. Vol. 12. July–December 1856. p. 632.

=== Sixth series (1857-1858) ===
- Eclectic Review. Vol. 1. January–June 1857. p. 664.
- Eclectic Review. Vol. 2. July–December 1857. p. 642.
- Greatheed, Samuel; Parken, Daniel; Williams, Theophilus; Conder, Josiah; Price, Thomas; Hood, Edwin Paxton; Ryland, Jonathan Edwards (January–June 1858). Eclectic Review. Vol. 3. p. 590.
- Greatheed, Samuel; Parken, Daniel; Williams, Theophilus; Conder, Josiah; Price, Thomas; Hood, Edwin Paxton; Ryland, Jonathan Edwards (July–December 1858). Eclectic Review. Vol. 4. p. 572.

=== Seventh series (1859-1861) ===
- Greatheed, Samuel; Parken, Daniel; Williams, Theophilus; Conder, Josiah; Price, Thomas; Ryland, Jonathan Edwards; Hood, Edwin Paxton (January–June 1859). Eclectic Review. Vol. 1. p. 672.
- Greatheed, Samuel; Parken, Daniel; Williams, Theophilus; Conder, Josiah; Price, Thomas; Hood, Edwin Paxton; Ryland, Jonathan Edwards (July–December 1859). Eclectic Review. Vol. 2. p. 664.
- Stowell, William Hendry (January–June 1860). Eclectic Review. Vol. 3. p. 664.
- Eclectic Review. Vol. 4. July–December 1860. p. 654.
- Greatheed, Samuel; Parken, Daniel; Williams, Theophilus; Conder, Josiah; Price, Thomas; Hood, Edwin Paxton; Ryland, Jonathan Edwards (January–June 1861). Eclectic Review. Vol. 5. p. 664.

=== Eighth series (1861-1868) ===
- Greatheed, Samuel; Parken, Daniel; Williams, Theophilus; Conder, Josiah; Price, Thomas; Hood, Edwin Paxton; Ryland, Jonathan Edwards (July–December 1861). Eclectic Review. Vol. 1. p. 764.
- Greatheed, Samuel; Parken, Daniel; Williams, Theophilus; Conder, Josiah; Price, Thomas; Ryland, Jonathan Edwards; Hood, Edwin Paxton (January–June 1862). Eclectic Review. Vol. 2. p. 582.
- Greatheed, Samuel; Parken, Daniel; Williams, Theophilus; Conder, Josiah; Price, Thomas; Ryland, Jonathan Edwards; Hood, Edwin Paxton (July–December 1862). Eclectic Review. Vol. 3. p. 558.
- Greatheed, Samuel; Parken, Daniel; Williams, Theophilus; Conder, Josiah; Price, Thomas; Hood, Edwin Paxton; Ryland, Jonathan Edwards (January–June 1863). Eclectic Review. Vol. 4. p. 583.
- Greatheed, Samuel; Parken, Daniel; Williams, Theophilus; Conder, Josiah; Price, Thomas; Ryland, Jonathan Edwards; Hood, Edwin Paxton (July–December 1863). Eclectic Review. Vol. 5. p. 564.
- Greatheed, Samuel; Parken, Daniel; Williams, Theophilus; Conder, Josiah; Price, Thomas; Hood, Edwin Paxton; Ryland, Jonathan Edwards (January–June 1864). Eclectic Review. Vol. 6. p. 768.
- Greatheed, Samuel; Parken, Daniel; Williams, Theophilus; Conder, Josiah; Price, Thomas; Ryland, Jonathan Edwards; Hood, Edwin Paxton (July–December 1864). Eclectic Review. Vol. 7. p. 718.
- Greatheed, Samuel; Parken, Daniel; Williams, Theophilus; Price, Thomas; Conder, Josiah; Ryland, Jonathan Edwards; Hood, Edwin Paxton (January–June 1865). Eclectic Review. Vol. 8. p. 626.
- Eclectic Review. Vol. 9. July–December 1865. p. 584.
- Eclectic Review. Vol. 10. January–June 1866. MISSING
- Price, Thomas; Stowell, William Hendry; Hood, Edwin Paxton; Ryland, Jonathan Edwards (July–December 1866). Eclectic Review. Vol. 11. p. 549.
- Eclectic Review. Vol. 12. January–June 1867. p. 467.
- Eclectic Review. Vol. 13. July–December 1867. p. 508.
- Eclectic Review. Vol. 14. January–June 1868. p. 576.
- Eclectic Review. Vol. 15. July–December 1868. MISSING

== Bibliography ==
- Basker, James E. The Eclectic Review. British Literary Magazines: The Romantic Age, 1789–1836. Ed. Alvin Sullivan. Westport, CT: Greenwood Press, 1983. ISBN 0-313-22872-8.
- Hiller, Mary Ruth (1994). "The Eclectic Review, 1805–1868". Victorian Periodicals Review. 27 (3): 179–283. JSTOR 20082783.
