= British Quarterly Review =

- Language: English

Publication details
- History: 1845–1886
- Frequency: Quarterly

Standard abbreviations
- ISO 4: Br. Q. Rev.

The British Quarterly Review was a periodical published between 1845 and 1886. It was founded by Robert Vaughan, out of dissatisfaction with the editorial line of the Eclectic Review under Edward Miall.

== Editors ==
- Robert Vaughan for its first 20 years.
- 1866–74 Henry Robert Reynolds.
- 1866–86 Henry Allon, initially with Reynolds.
