= Congregational Union of England and Wales =

Union of Congregational churches

The Congregational Union of England and Wales brought together churches in England and Wales in the Congregational tradition between 1831 and 1966.

== Background ==
The Congregational churches emerged from the Puritan movement, each church operating independently and autonomously. The movement grew with the Evangelical revival of the 18th century, and in urban areas following the Industrial Revolution. Despite their independence, many churches built links with each other, and several county unions of churches were formed.

In 1831, the Congregational Union of England and Wales was established. It had no authority over the affiliated churches, but instead aimed to advise and support them. By 1901, it claimed 400,000 members and 2,806 ministers. That year, its chairman, Joseph Parker, proposed that the churches set aside their independence to become the "United Congregational Church", but the idea was rejected.

The Congregational Union was based at the Congregational Memorial Hall in London from 1875 to 1968.

In 1966, the organisation became the Congregational Church in England and Wales, a change which prompted a few churches to leave and form the Evangelical Fellowship of Congregational Churches. In 1972, it merged with the Presbyterian Church of England, to form the United Reformed Church. Many of those churches which did not wish to join the new body instead formed the Congregational Federation. A smaller number of churches chose not to join any of these bodies and chose to be unaffiliated. Provision for them was made through the Unaffiliated Congregational Churches Charities.

== Affiliations ==
The London Missionary Society was the overseas mission arm of the Congregational churches.

Congregational ministers were trained at:

- Yorkshire United College, Bradford
- Western College, Bristol
- Cheshunt College, Cambridge
- New College London
- Lancashire Independent College, Manchester
- Paton Congregational College, Nottingham
- Mansfield College, Oxford

The Congregational Library is administered by the Congregational Memorial Hall Trust. It was originally housed in the Congregational Memorial Hall in Farringdon Street in London and was then moved to Dr Williams's Library, London, when the Hall site was sold. Dr Williams's Library also holds the former library of New College London. As of 2024, the Library is moving to Westminster College, Cambridge.
