= British Muslim Heritage Centre =

Listed building in Manchester, England

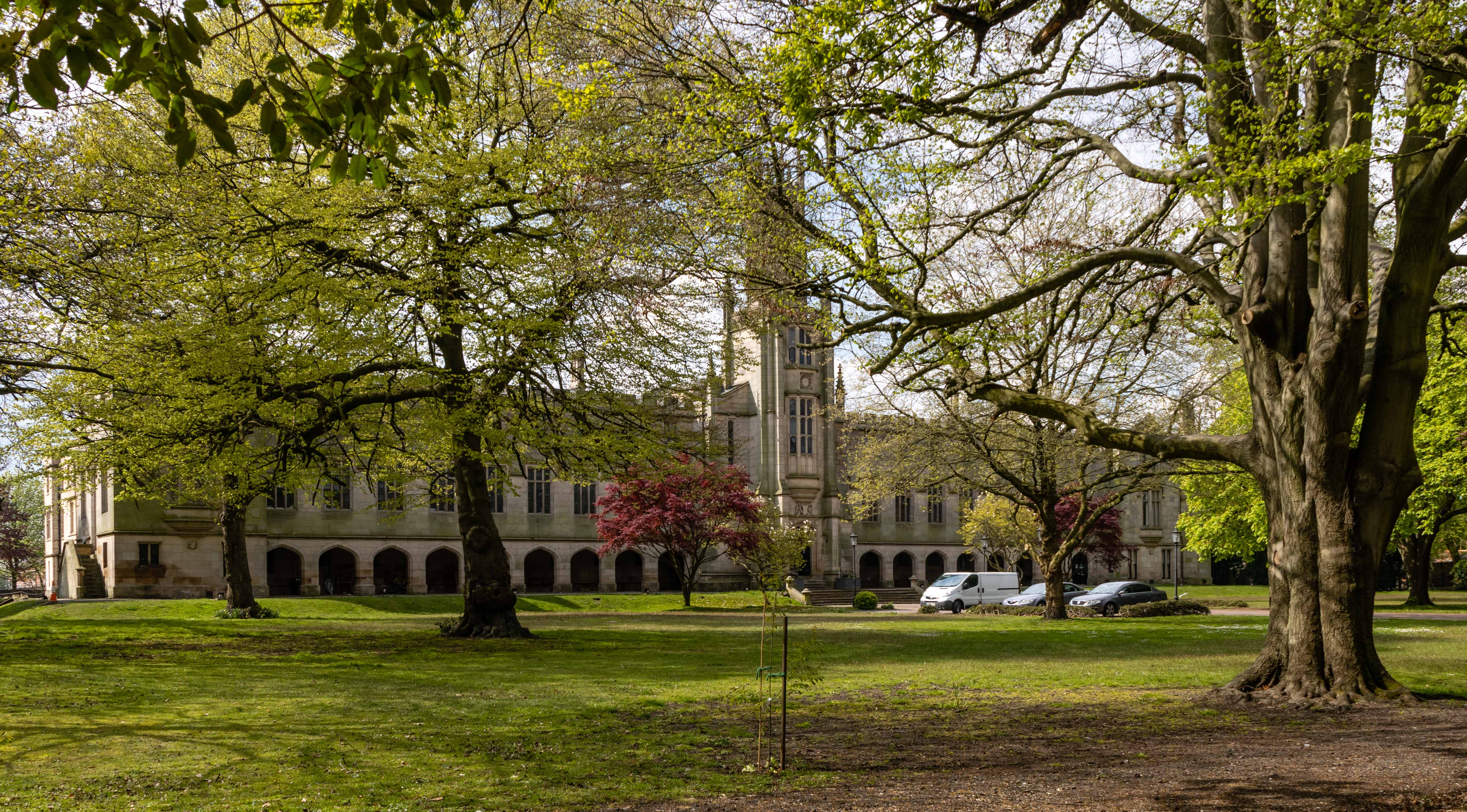
- The British Muslim Heritage Centre in 2021

- Location within Greater Manchester
- Former names: Lancashire Independent College; Northern Congregational College; GMB National College

General information
- Architectural style: Gothic Revival
- Location: College Road, Whalley Range, Manchester, England
- Coordinates: 53.4490°N 2.2644°W
- Year built: 1840–43

Design and construction
- Architects: Irwin and Chester
- Designations

Listed Building – Grade II*
- Official name: GMB National College
- Designated: 3 October 1974
- Reference no.: 1197762

Listed Building – Grade II
- Official name: Entrance gateway and gates to GMB National College
- Designated: 3 October 1974
- Reference no.: 1283094

Website
- bmhc.org.uk

The British Muslim Heritage Centre, formerly the GMB National College, is a Grade II* listed early Gothic Revival building on College Road in Whalley Range, an area of Manchester, England. Built between 1840 and 1843 as the Lancashire Independent College, a Congregational institution designed by Irwin and Chester, it later became known as the Northern Congregational College and housed refugee academics during the Second World War. The college remained in educational use until 1985, after which the building served as the GMB National College until its closure in 2004. It is now home to the British Muslim Heritage Centre, established to promote Muslim heritage and identity in Britain.

== History ==
The college was built as an independent Congregational institution between 1840 and 1843, designed by Irwin and Chester. It stood in a new suburb begun about 10 years earlier by Samuel Brooks, later known as Whalley Range. The Lancashire Independent College was established by the Lancashire Congregational Union to provide higher education for Non-Conformists, who were excluded from the Universities of Oxford and Cambridge until 1871. Its creation involved constructing a new building and transferring staff from Blackburn Academy, which then closed. The founders were George Hadfield, Thomas Raffles and William Roby, minister of the Grosvenor Street Chapel on London Road in Manchester.

Blackburn Academy had developed from courses offered to prospective Congregational ministers by Roby, supported by the Manchester merchant Robert Spear. When its principal, Joseph Fletcher, left for London, the academy became the Lancashire Independent College and moved to Manchester. The institution later became known as the Northern Congregational College.

During the Second World War the building houseed refugee academics, mainly from Czechoslovakia. The Northern Congregational College continued to use the premises until 1985, when it joined the Northern Baptist College at Luther King House on Brighton Grove.

The building became the GMB National College in 1985 and was used to train trade union negotiators. The GMB closed the college in 2004, judging it too expensive to maintain, as it required major structural work estimated at about £5 million. After a period of uncertainty, the building was purchased by the British Muslim Heritage Centre to serve as a focus for Muslim heritage and identity in Britain and to promote a balanced and moderate understanding of Islam.

In January 2013 and 2014 the building was nominated for the Arts and Culture Awareness award at the British Muslim Awards.

Nasar Mahmood currently serves as a trustee of the centre. He was awarded an OBE in the Queen's New Year Honours List in 2019.

== Architecture ==
The building is faced in sandstone, with brick used at the rear and slate roofs. Its plan is an extended E‑shape, with the main front facing north and two wings behind it, the central one containing the former chapel or hall. The design follows a Gothic‑influenced style, and the long front, raised above a full basement and centred on a tower, has a symmetrical layout with the middle and end sections projecting slightly. The entrance block is highly elaborate, with stepped buttresses finished as pinnacles, a flight of steps leading to a Tudor‑style arched doorway beneath a carved shield, and a tall oriel window above. This window has several tiers of glazing, a clock set into the panelling, a pierced parapet and corner pinnacles, and is topped by an octagonal lantern with open arches, gargoyles and further pinnacles. The side ranges include arcaded walkways, large mullioned and transomed windows on the main floor, smaller windows above, and a battlemented parapet. The wings have oriel windows and stepped gables with pinnacles, and all windows contain patterned leaded glass. The rear sections, built of brick, have similar windows, and the hall retains Tudor‑style arched openings with cusped glazing.

The overall appearance has often been compared to an Oxbridge college, a resemblance reinforced by its scale and formal composition. The site, formerly known as Jackson's Moss, required deep peat to be removed before construction could begin. Nikolaus Pevsner praised the "long, very impressive, ashlar-faced, Gothic front.", and commented that the wings culminate in a "tall, fanciful" tower, with a "two-storey Gothic oriel (window)." The entrance and assembly halls were altered by Alfred Waterhouse between 1876 and 1880; Pevsner regarded these changes as "disappointing, but the rooms along the piano nobile are very charming, their Gothic fireplaces, ceilings and doorcases nicely varied."

== Associated gateway and gates ==
The entrance to the former college is a Grade II listed gateway dating from around 1840 and also designed by Irwin and Chester. It is built in sandstone with cast‑iron gates, and features octagonal piers topped with pinnacles and small gabled arches on either side, with decorative ironwork in the centre. The gateway stands on the main axis of the building.

== See also ==
- Grade II* listed buildings in Greater Manchester
- Listed buildings in Manchester-M16
- Yorkshire United Independent College

== Bibliography ==
- Axon, William E. A. (1877). Handbook of the Public Libraries of Manchester and Salford. Manchester: Abel Heywood and Son.
- Hartwell, Clare; Hyde, Matthew; Pevsner, Nikolaus (2004). Lancashire: Manchester and the South East. The Buildings of England. New Haven, Connecticut: Yale University Press. ISBN 978-0-300-10583-4.
