= College =

Educational institution

Assumption College in Thailand

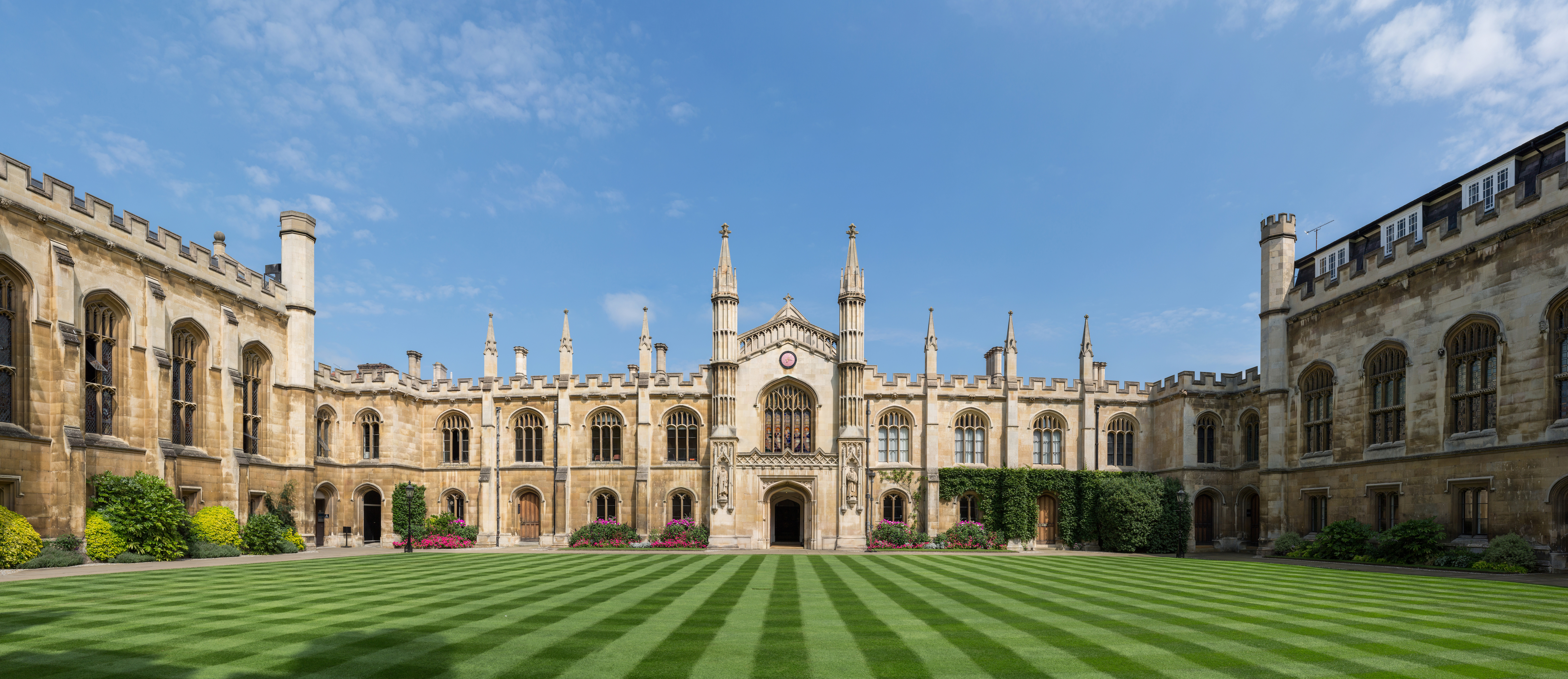
Corpus Christi College, one of the constituent colleges of the University of Cambridge in England

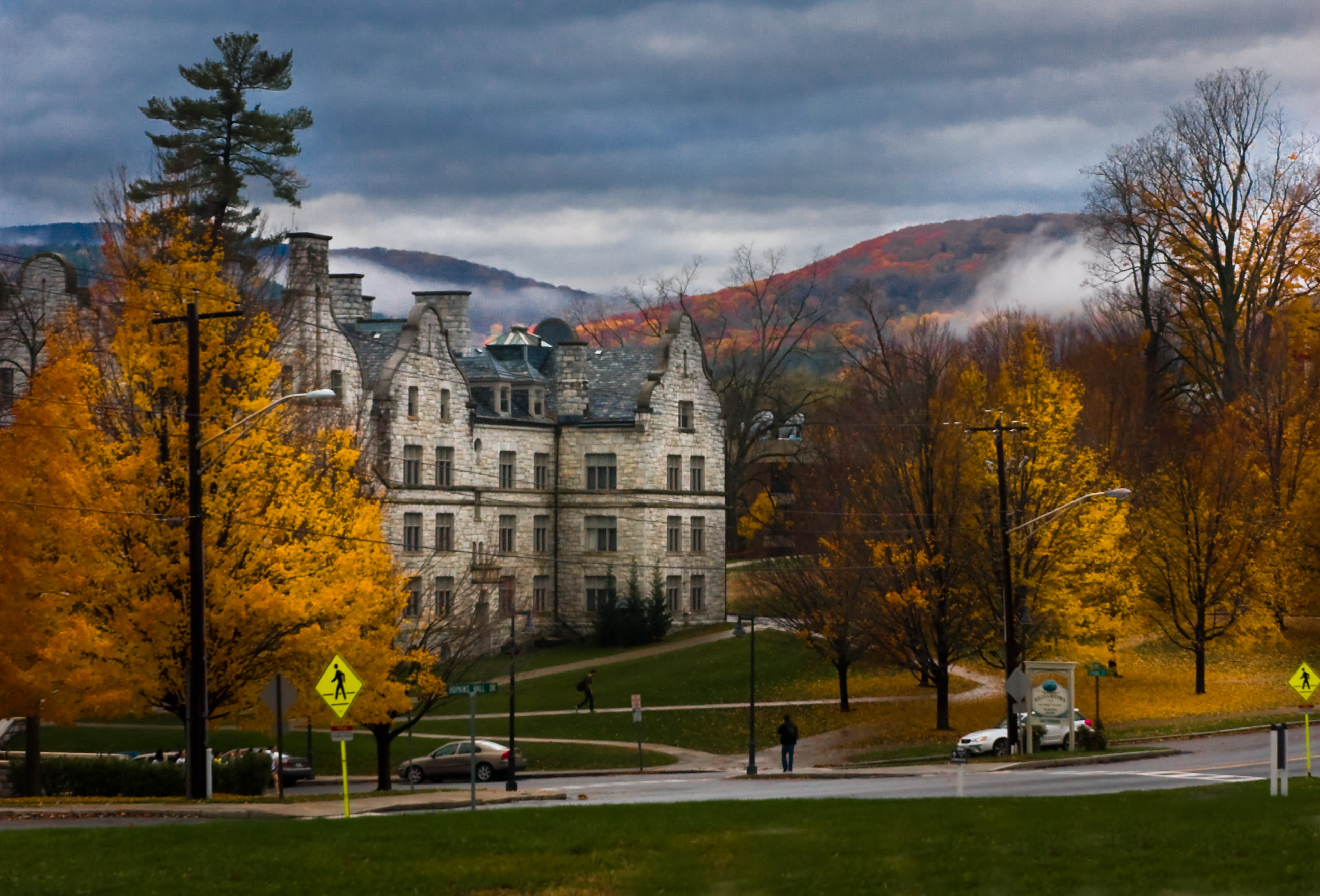
Williams College in Williamstown, Massachusetts, one of the oldest liberal arts colleges in the United States

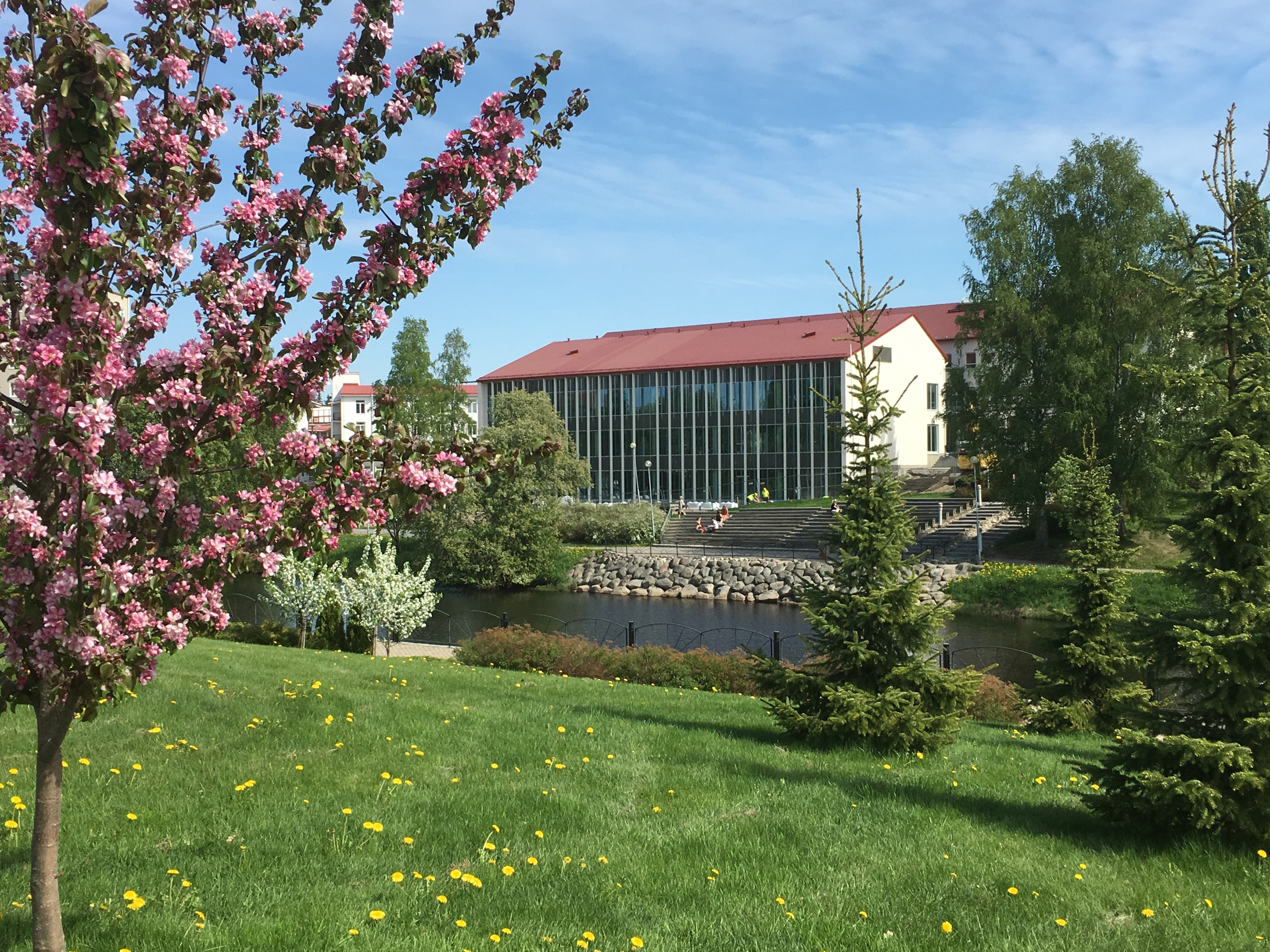
Seinäjoki College in Seinäjoki, South Ostrobothnia, Finland, in May 2018

A college (Latin: collegium) is an educational institution. Within higher education, it may be a part of a collegiate university, an academic division within a university, or a standalone institution providing undergraduate education (and sometimes awarding academic degrees). It may also be an institution providing further education, vocational education, or secondary education.

In most of the world, a college may be a high school or secondary school, a college of further education, a training institution that awards trade qualifications, a higher-education provider that does not have university status (often without its own degree-awarding powers), or a constituent part of a university. In the United States, a college may offer undergraduate programs – either as an independent institution or as the undergraduate program of a university – or it may be a residential college of a university or a community college, referring to (primarily public) higher-education institution that aim to provide affordable and accessible education, usually limited to two-year associate degrees. The word "college" is also commonly used as a synonym for a university in the United States, and in phrases such as "college students" or "going to college" it is understood to mean any degree granting institution, whether denominated a school, an institute, a college, or a university.

Colleges in countries such as France, Belgium, and Switzerland provide secondary education.

== Etymology ==
The "red seminar", a college building pictured in the coat of arms of Nuuk, the capital city of Greenland

The word "college" is from the Latin verb lego, legere, legi, lectum, "to collect, gather together, pick", plus the preposition cum, "with", thus meaning "selected together". Thus, "colleagues" are literally "persons who have been selected to work together". In ancient Rome a collegium was a "body, guild, corporation united in colleagueship; of magistrates, praetors, tribunes, priests, augurs; a political club or trade guild". Thus a college was a form of corporation or corporate body, an artificial legal person (body/corpus) with its own legal personality, with the capacity to enter into legal contracts, to sue and be sued. In mediaeval England there were colleges of priests, for example in chantry chapels; modern survivals include the Royal College of Surgeons in England (originally the Guild of Surgeons Within the City of London), the College of Arms in London (a body of heralds enforcing heraldic law), an electoral college (to elect representatives); all groups of persons "selected in common" to perform a specified function and appointed by a monarch, founder or other person in authority. As for the modern "college of education", it was a body created for that purpose, for example Eton College was founded in 1440 by letters patent of King Henry VI for the constitution of a college of Fellows, priests, clerks, choristers, poor scholars, and old poor men, with one master or governor, whose duty it shall be to instruct these scholars and any others who may resort thither from any part of England in the knowledge of letters, and especially of grammar, without payment".

== Overview ==
=== Higher education ===
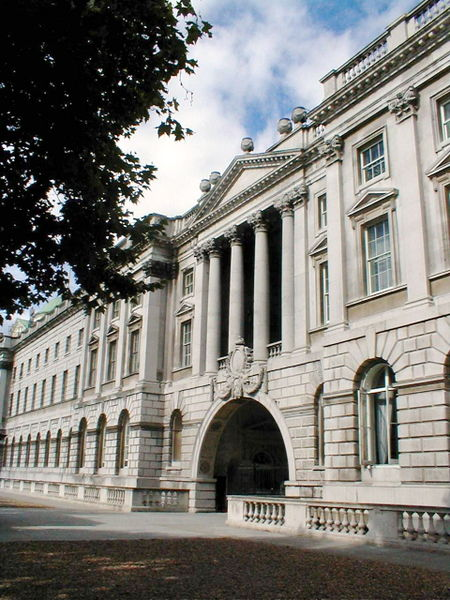
King's College London, established by royal charter in 1829, is one of the founding colleges of the University of London

Within higher education, the term can be used to refer to:

- A constituent part of a collegiate university, for example King's College, Cambridge, or of a federal university, for example King's College London.
- A liberal arts college, an independent institution of higher education focusing on undergraduate education, such as Wellesley College or Amherst College.
- A liberal arts division of a university whose undergraduate program does not otherwise follow a liberal arts model, such as the Yuanpei College at Peking University.
- An institute providing specialised training, such as a college of further education, for example Belfast Metropolitan College, a teacher training college, or an art college.
- A Catholic higher education institute which includes universities, colleges, and other institutions of higher education privately run by the Catholic Church, typically by religious institutes. Those tied to the Holy See are specifically called pontifical universities.
- In the United States, college is sometimes but rarely a synonym for a research university, such as Dartmouth College, one of the eight universities in the Ivy League.
- In the United States, the undergraduate college of a university which also confers graduate degrees, such as Yale College, the undergraduate college within Yale University.

=== Further education ===
A sixth form college or college of further education is an educational institution in England, Wales, Northern Ireland, Belize, the Caribbean, Malta, Norway, Brunei, and Southern Africa, among others, where students aged 16 to 19 typically study for advanced school-level qualifications, such as A-levels, BTEC, HND or its equivalent and the International Baccalaureate Diploma, or school-level qualifications such as GCSEs. In Singapore and India, this is known as a junior college. The municipal government of the city of Paris uses the phrase "sixth form college" as the English name for a lycée.

=== Secondary education ===
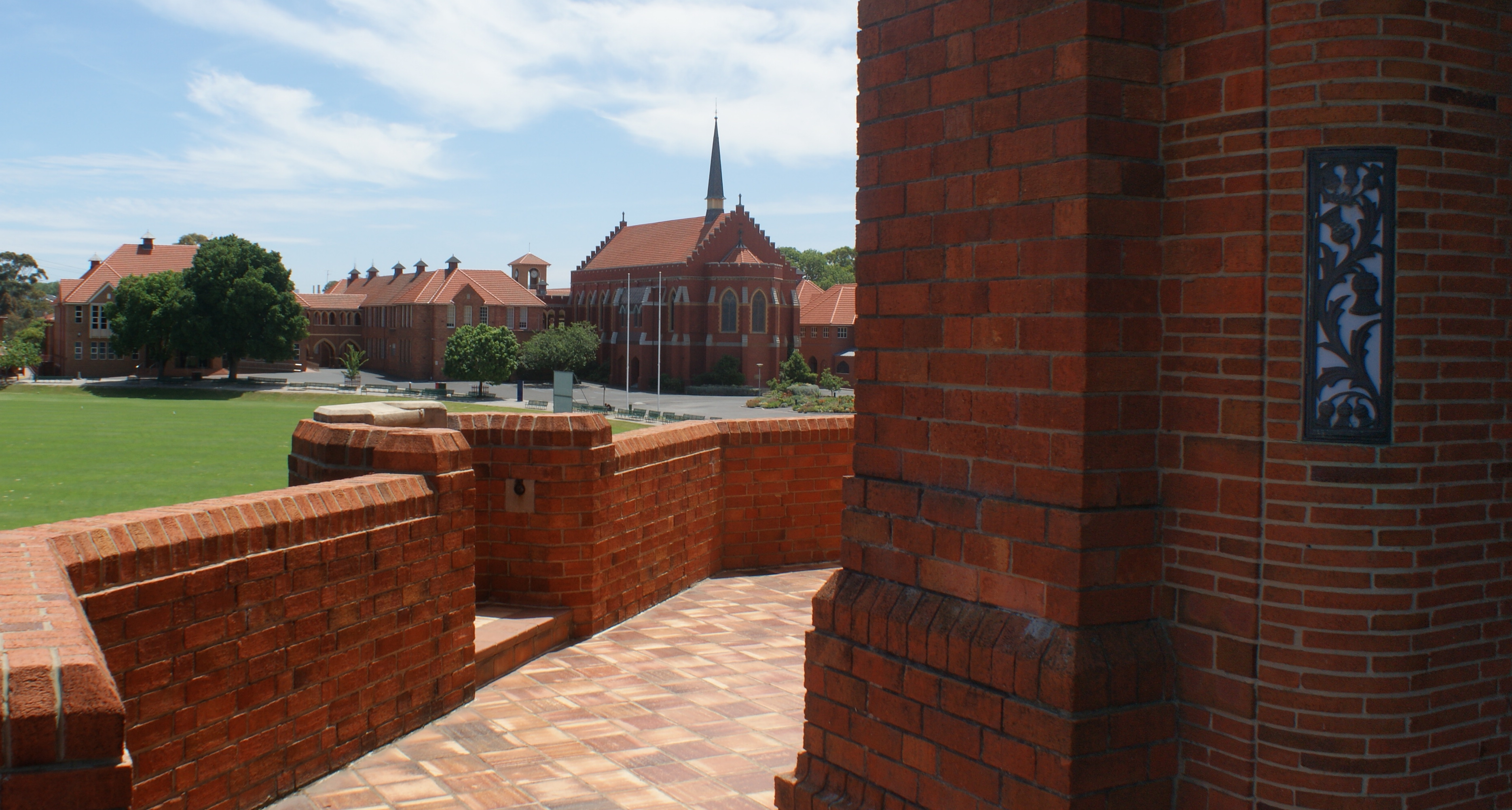
Scotch College, Melbourne, an independent secondary school in Australia

In some national education systems, secondary schools may be called "colleges" or have "college" as part of their title. In countries such as France, Belgium and Switzerland "college" may refer exclusively to secondary schools.

=== Other ===
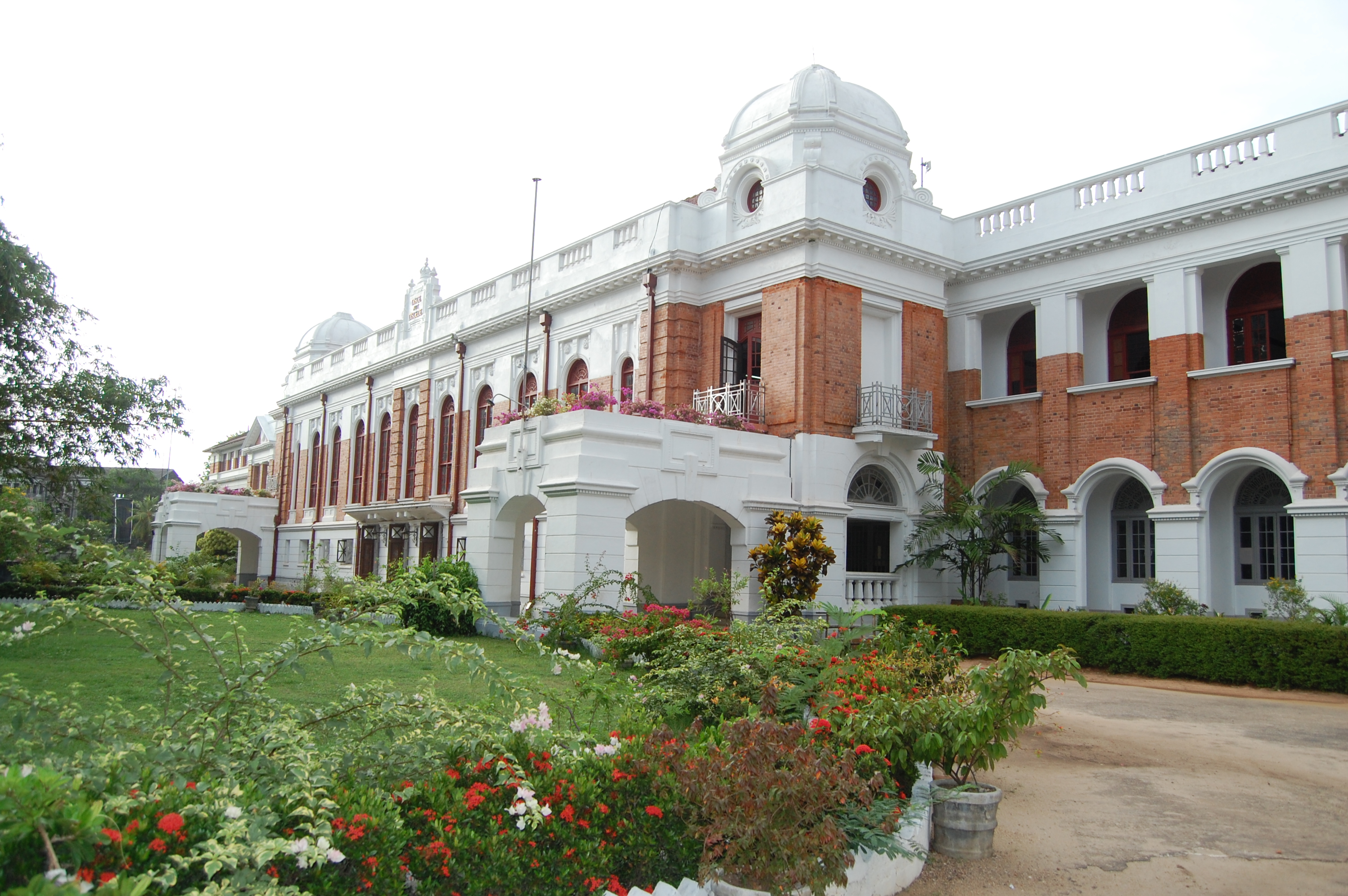
Royal College Colombo, a boys' school located in Colombo, Sri Lanka

As well as an educational institution, the term, in accordance with its etymology, may also refer to any formal group of colleagues set up under statute or regulation; often under a Royal Charter. Examples include an electoral college, the College of Arms, a college of canons, and the College of Cardinals. Other collegiate bodies include professional associations, particularly in medicine and allied professions. In the UK these include the Royal College of Nursing and the Royal College of Physicians. Examples in the United States include the American College of Physicians, the American College of Surgeons, and the American College of Dentists. An example in Australia is the Royal Australian College of General Practitioners.

== By country ==
The different ways in which the term "college" is used to describe educational institutions in various regions of the world is listed below:

=== Americas ===
==== Canada ====
In Canadian English, the term "college" usually refers to a trades school, applied arts/science/technology/business/health school or community college. These are post-secondary institutions granting certificates, diplomas, associate degrees and (in some cases) bachelor's degrees. The French acronym specific to public institutions within Quebec's particular system of pre-university and technical education is CEGEP (Collège d'enseignement général et professionnel, "college of general and professional education"). They are collegiate-level institutions that a student typically enrols in if they wish to continue onto university in the Quebec education system, (Note: Exceptions are made for "mature" student, meaning 21 years of age or over, and out of the educational system for at least 2 years.) or to learn a trade. In Ontario and Alberta, there are also institutions that are designated university colleges, which only grant undergraduate degrees. This is to differentiate between universities, which have both undergraduate and graduate programs and those that do not.

In Canada, there is a strong distinction between "college" and "university". In conversation, one specifically would say either "they are going to university" (i.e., studying for a three- or four-year degree at a university) or "they are going to college" (i.e., studying at a technical/career training).

In a number of Canadian cities, many government-run secondary schools are called "collegiates" or "collegiate institutes" (C.I.), a complicated form of the word "college" which avoids the usual "post-secondary" connotation. This is because these secondary schools have traditionally focused on academic, rather than vocational, subjects and ability levels (for example, collegiates offered Latin while vocational schools offered technical courses). Some private secondary schools (such as Upper Canada College, Vancouver College) choose to use the word "college" in their names nevertheless. Some secondary schools elsewhere in the country, particularly ones within the separate school system, may also use the word "college" or "collegiate" in their names.

===== Usage in a university setting =====
The term college also applies to distinct entities that formally act as an affiliated institution of the university, formally referred to as federated college, or affiliated colleges. A university may also formally include several constituent colleges, forming a collegiate university. Examples of collegiate universities in Canada include Trent University, and the University of Toronto. These types of institutions act independently, maintaining their own endowments, and properties. However, they remain either affiliated, or federated with the overarching university, with the overarching university being the institution that formally grants the degrees. For example, Trinity College was once an independent institution, but later became federated with the University of Toronto. Several centralized universities in Canada have mimicked the collegiate university model; although constituent colleges in a centralized university remains under the authority of the central administration. Centralized universities that have adopted the collegiate model to a degree includes the University of British Columbia, with Green College and St. John's College; and the Memorial University of Newfoundland, with Sir Wilfred Grenfell College.

Occasionally, "college" refers to a subject specific faculty within a university that, while distinct, are neither federated nor affiliated—College of Education, College of Medicine, College of Dentistry, College of Biological Science among others.

The Royal Military College of Canada is a military college which trains officers for the Canadian Armed Forces. The institution is a full-fledged university, with the authority to issue graduate degrees, although it continues to word the term college in its name. The institution's sister schools, Royal Military College Saint-Jean also uses the term college in its name, although it academic offering is akin to a CEGEP institution in Quebec. A number of post-secondary art schools in Canada formerly used the word college in their names, despite formally being universities. However, most of these institutions were renamed, or re-branded in the early 21st century, omitting the word college from its name.

===== Usage in secondary education =====
The word college continues to be used in the names public separate secondary schools in Ontario. A number of independent schools across Canada also use the word college in its name.

Public secular school boards in Ontario also refer to their secondary schools as collegiate institutes. However, usage of the word collegiate institute varies between school boards. Collegiate institute is the predominant name for secondary schools in Lakehead District School Board, and Toronto District School Board, although most school boards in Ontario use collegiate institute alongside high school, and secondary school in the names of their institutions. Similarly, secondary schools in Regina, and Saskatoon are referred to as Collegiate.

==== Chile ====
Officially, since 2009, the Pontifical Catholic University of Chile incorporated the term "college" as the name of a tertiary education program as a bachelor's degree. The program features a Bachelor of Natural Sciences and Mathematics, a Bachelor of Social Science and a Bachelor of Arts and Humanities. It has the same system as the American universities, it combines majors and minors and finally, it let the students continue a higher degree in the same university once the program it is completed.

But in Chile, the term "college" is not usually used for tertiary education, but is used mainly in the name of some private bilingual schools, corresponding to levels 0, 1 and 2 of the ISCED 2011. Some examples are they Santiago College, Saint George's College, among others.

==== United States ====
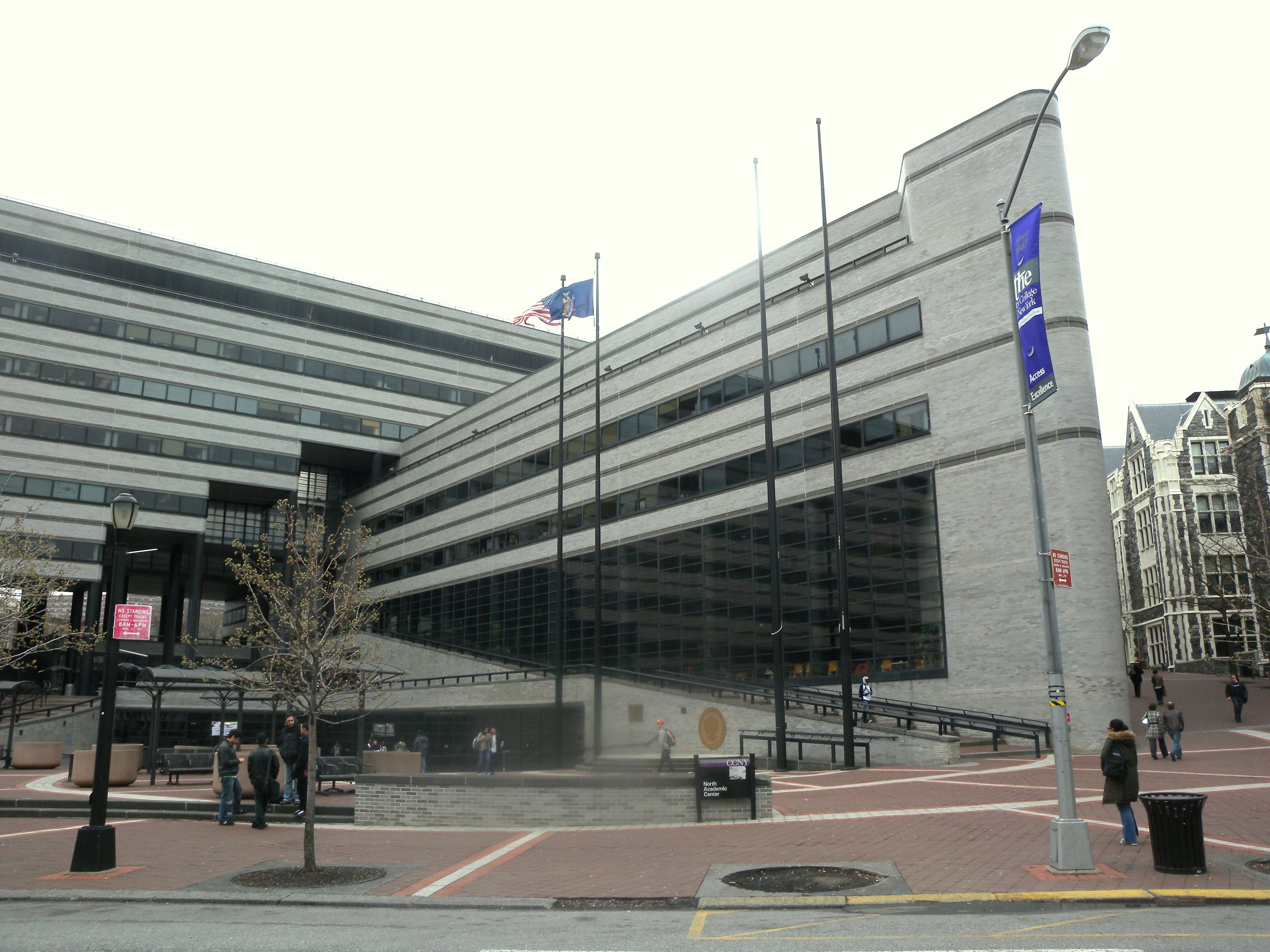
City College of New York

In the United States, there were 5,916 post-secondary institutions (universities and colleges) as of 2020–21, having peaked at 7,253 in 2012–13 and fallen every year since. A "college" In the United States can refer to a constituent part of a university (which can be a residential college, the sub-division of the university offering undergraduate courses, or a school of the university offering particular specialized courses), an independent institution offering bachelor's-level courses, or an institution offering instruction in a particular professional, technical or vocational field. In popular usage, the word "college" is the generic term for any post-secondary undergraduate education. Americans "go to college" after high school, regardless of whether the specific institution is formally a college or a university. Some students choose to dual-enroll, by taking college classes while still in high school. The word and its derivatives are the standard terms used to describe the institutions and experiences associated with American post-secondary undergraduate education.

Students typically pay tuition before enrolling in classes. Some borrow the money via loans, and some students fund their educations with cash, scholarships, grants, or some combination of these payment methods. In 2011, the state or federal government subsidized $8,000 to $100,000 for each undergraduate degree. For state-owned schools (called "public" universities), the subsidy was given to the college, with the student benefiting from lower tuition. The state subsidized on average 50% of public university tuition.

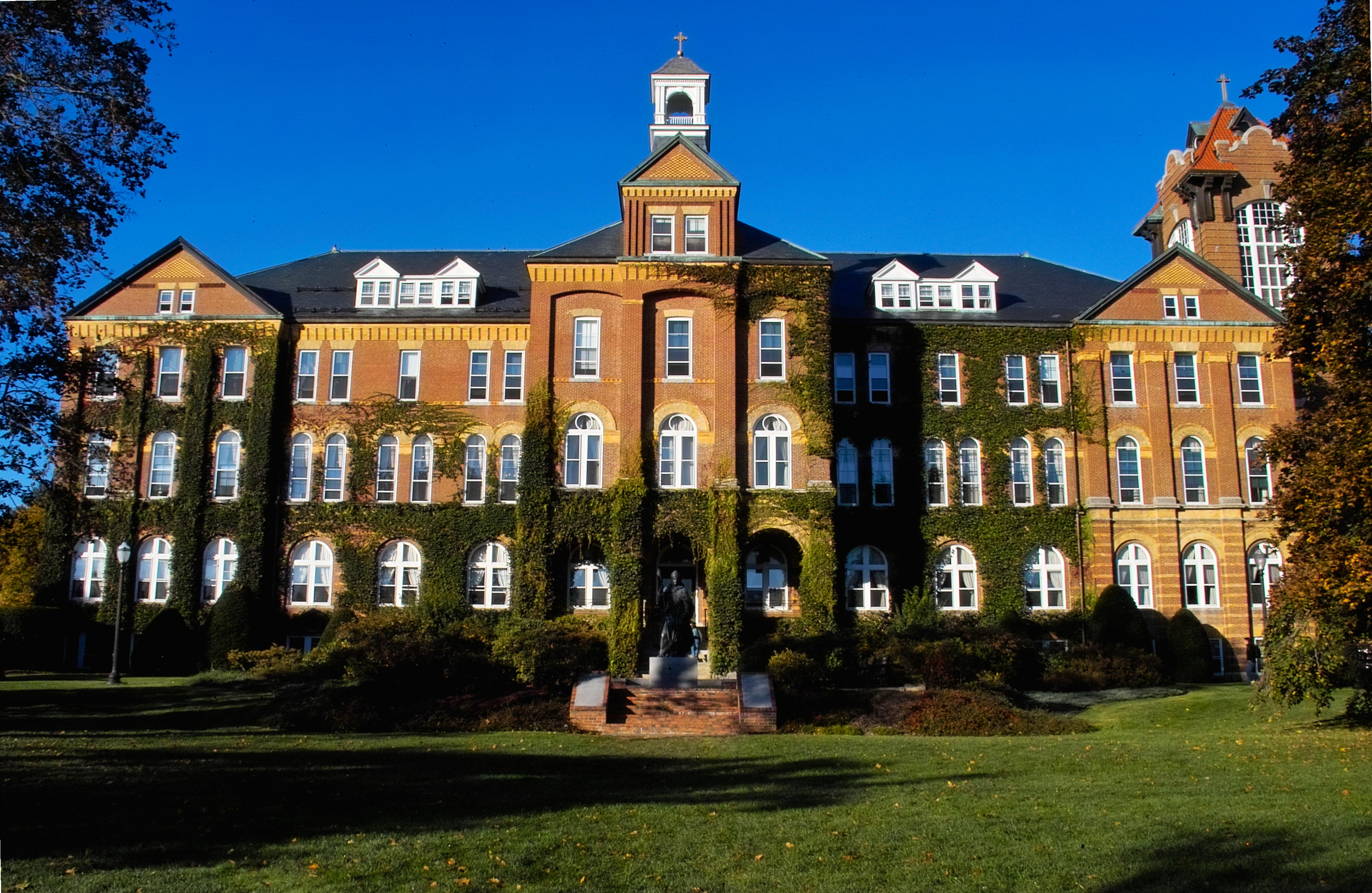
Saint Anselm College

Colleges vary in terms of size, degree offerings, and length of study. Two-year colleges, also known as junior or community colleges, usually offer an associate degree, and four-year colleges usually offer a bachelor's degree. Often, these are entirely undergraduate institutions, although some have graduate school programs.

Four-year institutions in the U.S. that emphasize a liberal arts curriculum are known as liberal arts colleges. Until the 20th century, liberal arts, law, medicine, theology, and divinity were about the only form of higher education available in the United States. These schools have traditionally emphasized instruction at the undergraduate level, although advanced research may still occur at these institutions.

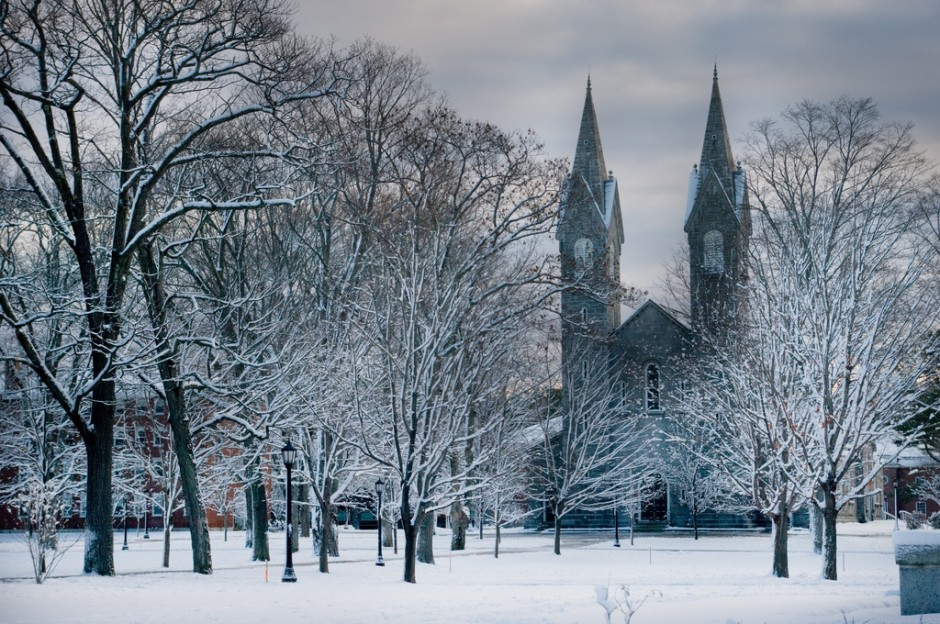
Bowdoin College

While there is no national standard in the United States, the term "university" primarily designates institutions that provide undergraduate and graduate education. A university typically has as its core and its largest internal division an undergraduate college teaching a liberal arts curriculum, also culminating in a bachelor's degree. What often distinguishes a university is having, in addition, one or more graduate schools engaged in both teaching graduate classes and in research. Often these would be called a School of Law or School of Medicine, (but may also be called a college of law, or a faculty of law). An exception is Vincennes University, Indiana, which is styled and chartered as a "university" even though almost all of its academic programs lead only to two-year associate degrees. Some institutions, such as Dartmouth College and The College of William & Mary, have retained the term "college" in their names for historical reasons. In one unique case, Boston College and Boston University, the former located in Chestnut Hill, Massachusetts and the latter located in Boston, Massachusetts, are completely separate institutions.

Usage of the terms varies among the states. In 1996, for example, Georgia changed all of its four-year institutions previously designated as colleges to universities, and all of its vocational technology schools to technical colleges.

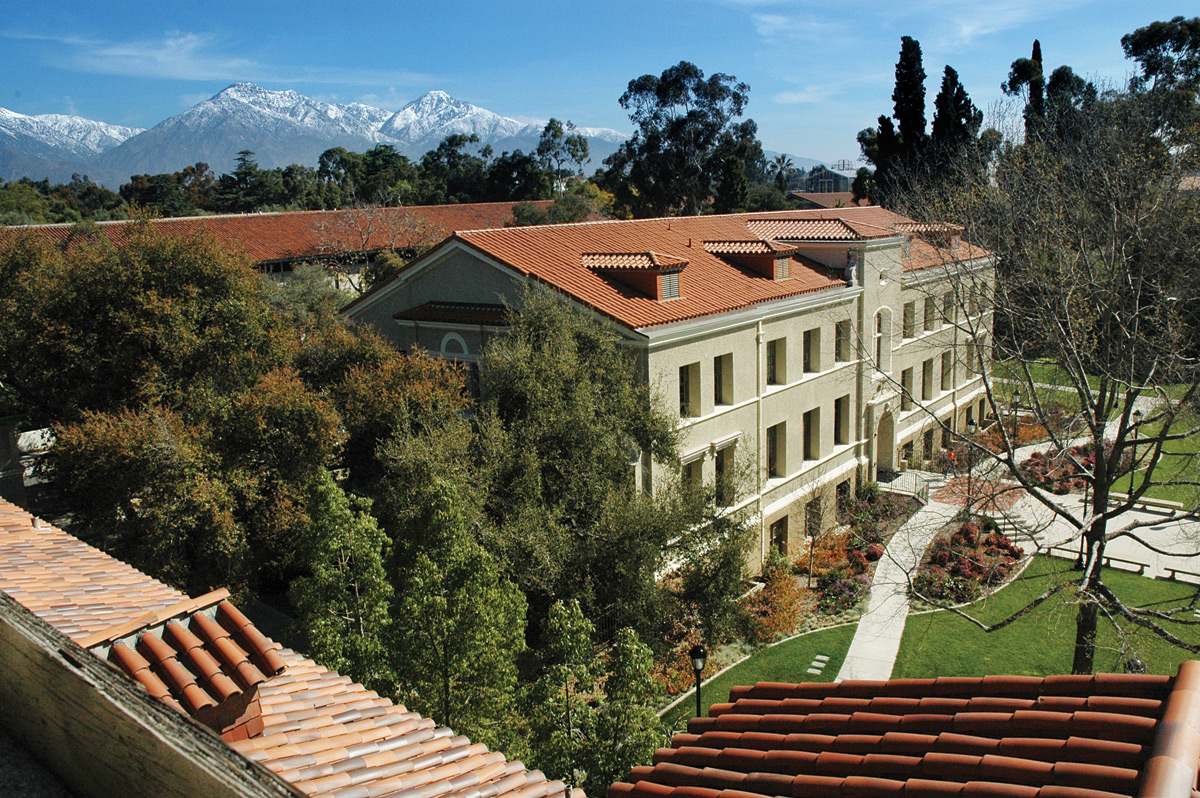
Pomona College

The terms "university" and "college" do not exhaust all possible titles for an American institution of higher education. Other options include "institute" (Worcester Polytechnic Institute and Massachusetts Institute of Technology), "academy" (United States Military Academy), "union" (Cooper Union), "conservatory" (New England Conservatory), and "school" (Juilliard School). In colloquial use, the institutions are still referred to as "college" when referring to undergraduate studies.

The term college is also, as in the United Kingdom, used for a constituent semi-autonomous part of a larger university but generally organized on academic rather than residential lines. For example, at many institutions, the undergraduate portion of the university can be briefly referred to as the college (such as the College of the University of Chicago, Harvard College at Harvard, or Columbia College of Columbia University) while at others, such as the University of California, Berkeley, "colleges" are collections of academic programs and other units that share some common characteristics, mission, or disciplinary focus (the "college of engineering", the "college of nursing", and so forth). There exist other variants for historical reasons, including some uses that exist because of mergers and acquisitions; for example, Duke University, which was called Trinity College until the 1920s, still calls its main undergraduate subdivision Trinity College of Arts and Sciences.

===== Residential colleges =====
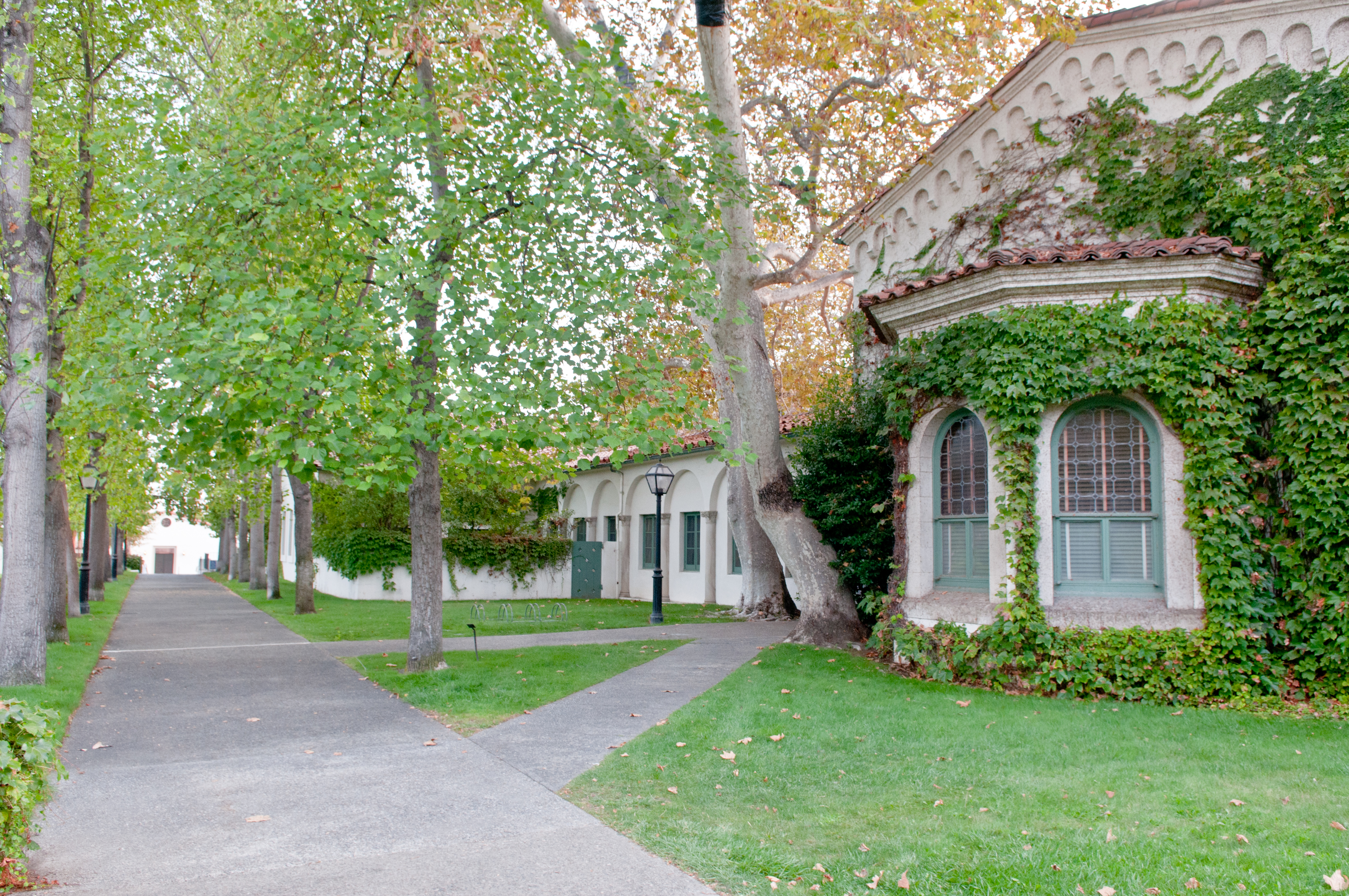
Scripps College

Some American universities, such as Princeton, Rice, and Yale have established residential colleges (sometimes, as at Harvard, the first to establish such a system in the 1930s, known as houses) along the lines of Oxford or Cambridge. Unlike the Oxbridge colleges, but similarly to Durham, these residential colleges are not autonomous legal entities nor are they typically much involved in education itself, being primarily concerned with room, board, and social life. At the University of Michigan, University of California, San Diego and the University of California, Santa Cruz, each residential college teaches its own core writing courses and has its own distinctive set of graduation requirements.

Many American universities have placed increased emphasis on their residential colleges in recent years. This is exemplified by the creation of new colleges at Ivy League schools such as Yale University and Princeton University, and efforts to strengthen the contribution of the residential colleges to student education, including through a 2016 taskforce at Princeton on residential colleges.

===== Origin of the American usage =====
The founders of the first institutions of higher education in the United States were graduates of the University of Oxford and the University of Cambridge. The small institutions they founded would not have seemed to them like universities – they were tiny and did not offer the higher degrees in medicine and theology. Furthermore, they were not composed of several small colleges. Instead, the new institutions felt like the Oxford and Cambridge colleges they were used to – small communities, housing and feeding their students, with instruction from residential tutors (as in the United Kingdom, described above). When the first students graduated, these "colleges" assumed the right to confer degrees upon them, usually with authority—for example, The College of William & Mary has a royal charter from the British monarchy allowing it to confer degrees while Dartmouth College has a charter permitting it to award degrees "as are usually granted in either of the universities, or any other college in our realm of Great Britain."

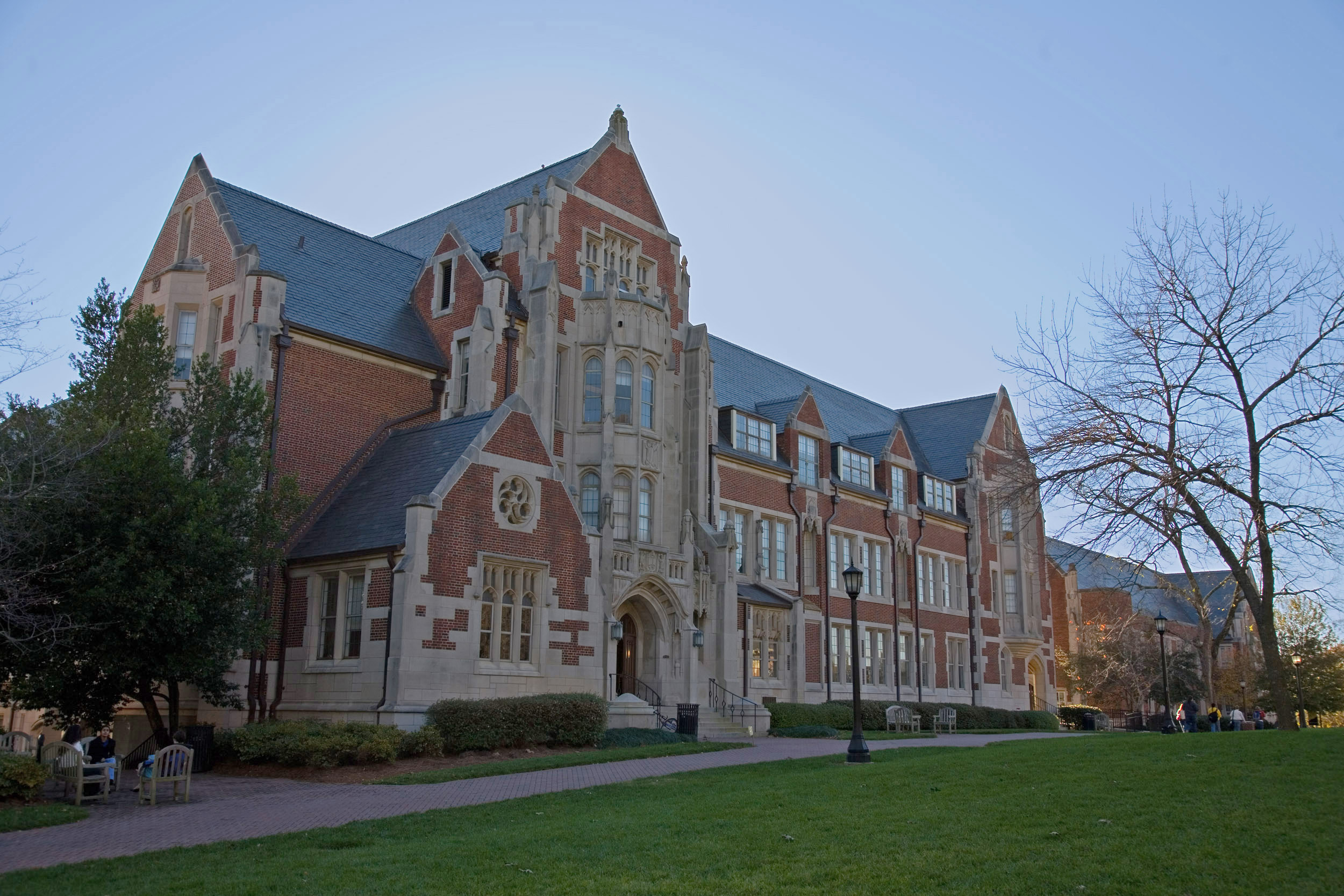
Agnes Scott College

The leaders of Harvard College (which granted America's first degrees in 1642) might have thought of their college as the first of many residential colleges that would grow up into a New Cambridge university. However, over time, few new colleges were founded there, and Harvard grew and added higher faculties. Eventually, it changed its title to university, but the term "college" had stuck and "colleges" have arisen across the United States.

In American English, the word "college" not only embodies a particular type of school, but has historically been used to refer to the general concept of undergraduate education when it is not necessary to specify a school, as in "going to college" or "college savings accounts" offered by banks.

===== Morrill Land-Grant Act =====
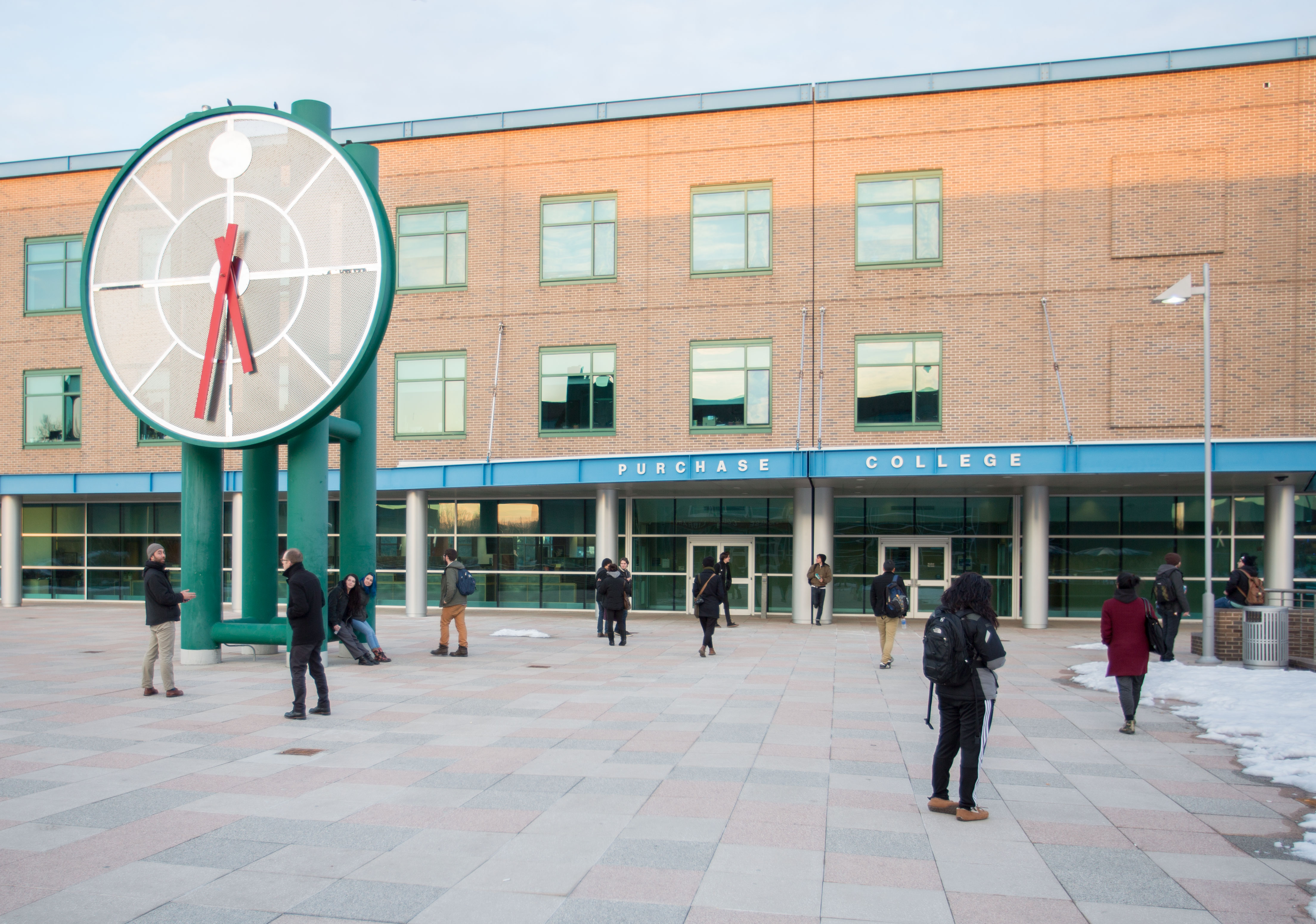
SUNY Purchase College

In addition to private colleges and universities, the U.S. also has a system of government funded, public universities. Many were founded under the Morrill Land-Grant Colleges Act of 1862. A movement had arisen to bring a form of more practical higher education to the masses, as "...many politicians and educators wanted to make it possible for all young Americans to receive some sort of advanced education." The Morrill Act "...made it possible for the new western states to establish colleges for the citizens." Its goal was to make higher education more easily accessible to the citizenry of the country, specifically to improve agricultural systems by providing training and scholarship in the production and sales of agricultural products, and to provide formal education in "...agriculture, home economics, mechanical arts, and other professions that seemed practical at the time."

The act was eventually extended to allow all states that had remained with the Union during the American Civil War, and eventually all states, to establish such institutions. Most of the colleges established under the Morrill Act have since become full universities, and some are among the elite of the world.

=== Asia ===
==== Bangladesh ====
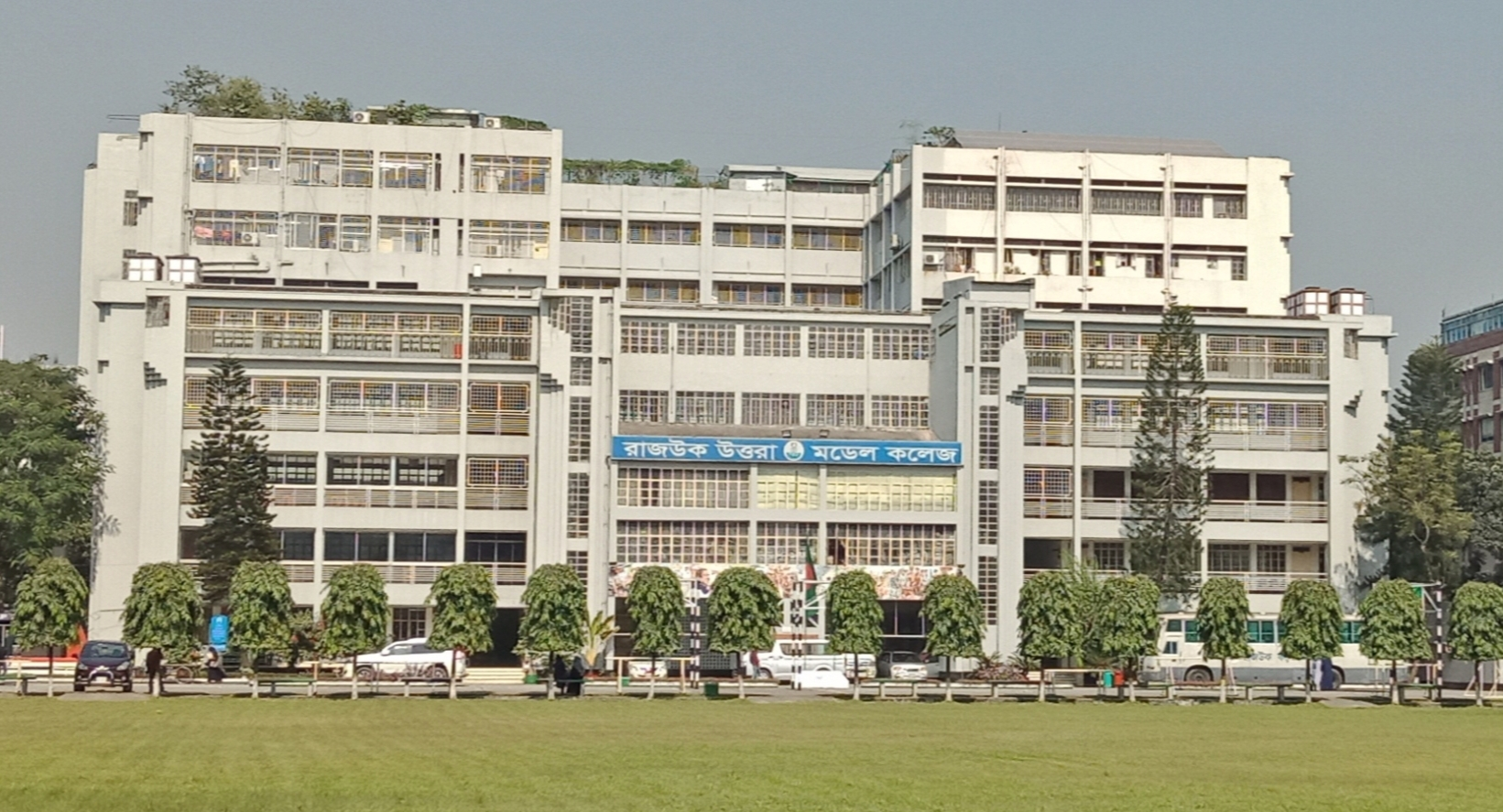
RAJUK Uttara Model College, located in the northern suburb of Uttara in the capital Dhaka

In Bangladesh, educational institutions offering higher secondary (11th–12th grade) education are known as colleges.

==== Hong Kong ====
In Hong Kong, the term 'college' is used by tertiary institutions as either part of their names or to refer to a constituent part of the university, such as the colleges in the collegiate The Chinese University of Hong Kong; or to a residence hall of a university, such as St. John's College, University of Hong Kong. Many older secondary schools have the term 'college' as part of their names.

==== India ====
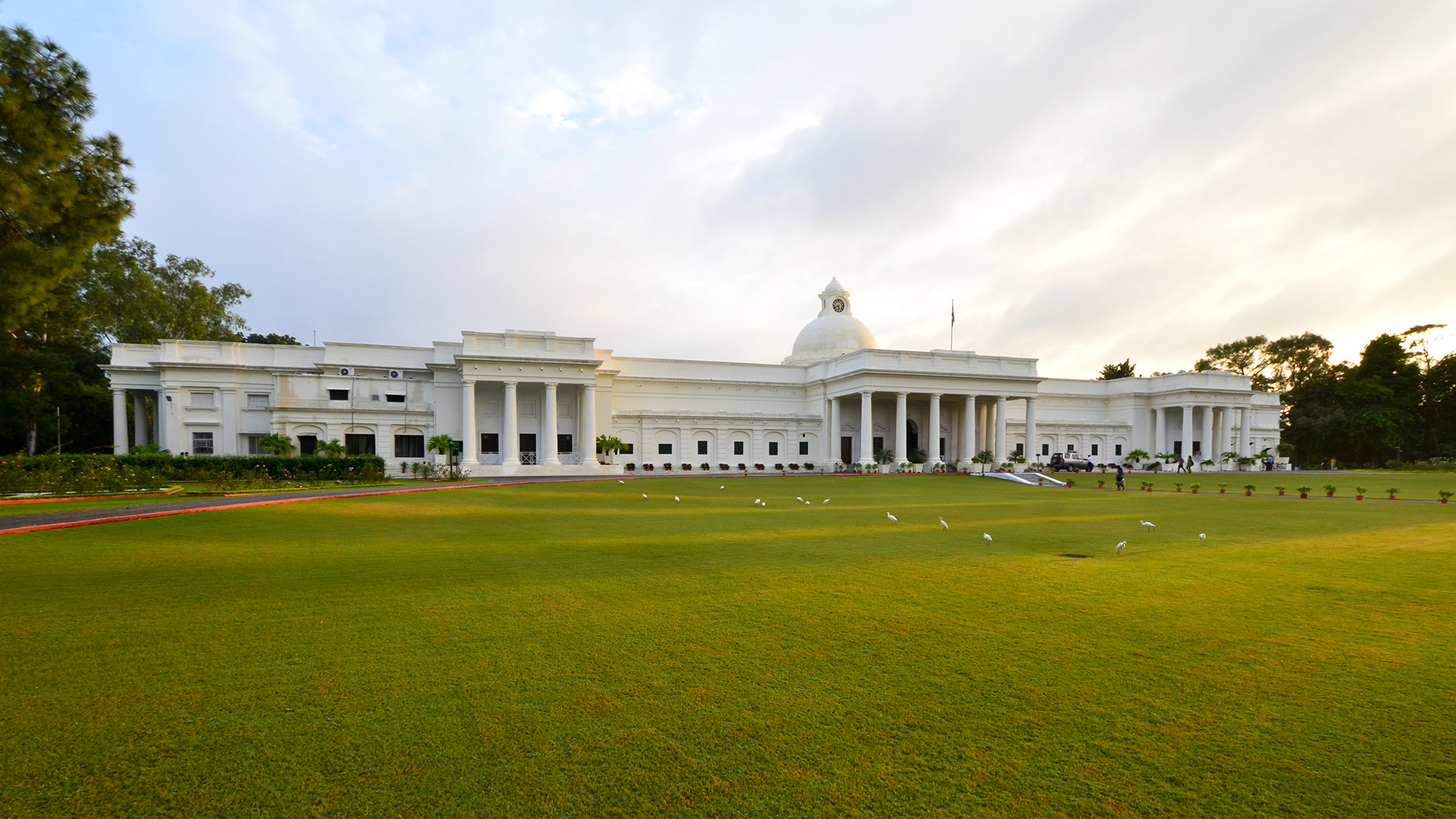
The Indian Institute of Technology, Roorkee is the oldest technical institution in Asia.

The modern system of education was heavily influenced by the British starting in 1835.

In India, the term "college" is commonly reserved for institutions that offer high school diplomas at year 12 ("Junior College", similar to American high schools), and those that offer the bachelor's degree; some colleges, however, offer programmes up to PhD level. Generally, colleges are located in different parts of a state and all of them are affiliated to a regional university. The colleges offer programmes leading to degrees of that university. Colleges may be either Autonomous or non-autonomous. Autonomous Colleges are empowered to establish their own syllabus, and conduct and assess their own examinations; in non-autonomous colleges, examinations are conducted by the university, at the same time for all colleges under its affiliation. There are several hundred universities and each university has affiliated colleges, often a large number.

The first liberal arts and sciences college in India was "Cottayam College" or the "Syrian College", Kerala in 1815. The First inter linguistic residential education institution in Asia was started at this college. At present it is a Theological seminary which is popularly known as Orthodox Theological Seminary or Old Seminary. After that, CMS College, Kottayam, established in 1817, and the Presidency College, Kolkata, also 1817, initially known as Hindu College. The first college for the study of Christian theology and ecumenical enquiry was Serampore College (1818). The first Missionary institution to impart Western style education in India was the Scottish Church College, Calcutta (1830). The first commerce and economics college in India was Sydenham College, Mumbai (1913).

In India, a new term has been introduced: Autonomous Institutes & Colleges. Autonomous colleges are colleges that need to be affiliated with a certain university. These colleges can conduct their own admission procedures, examinations, syllabus design, fee structure, etc. However, at the end of the course, they cannot issue their own degree or diploma. The final degree or diploma is issued by the affiliated university. Also, some significant changes can pave way under the NEP (New Education Policy 2020) which may affect the present guidelines for universities and colleges. Implemented in the 2023–2024 academic year, the new education policy is said to fill the gaps and cover the drawbacks of the Indian education system.

==== Israel ====
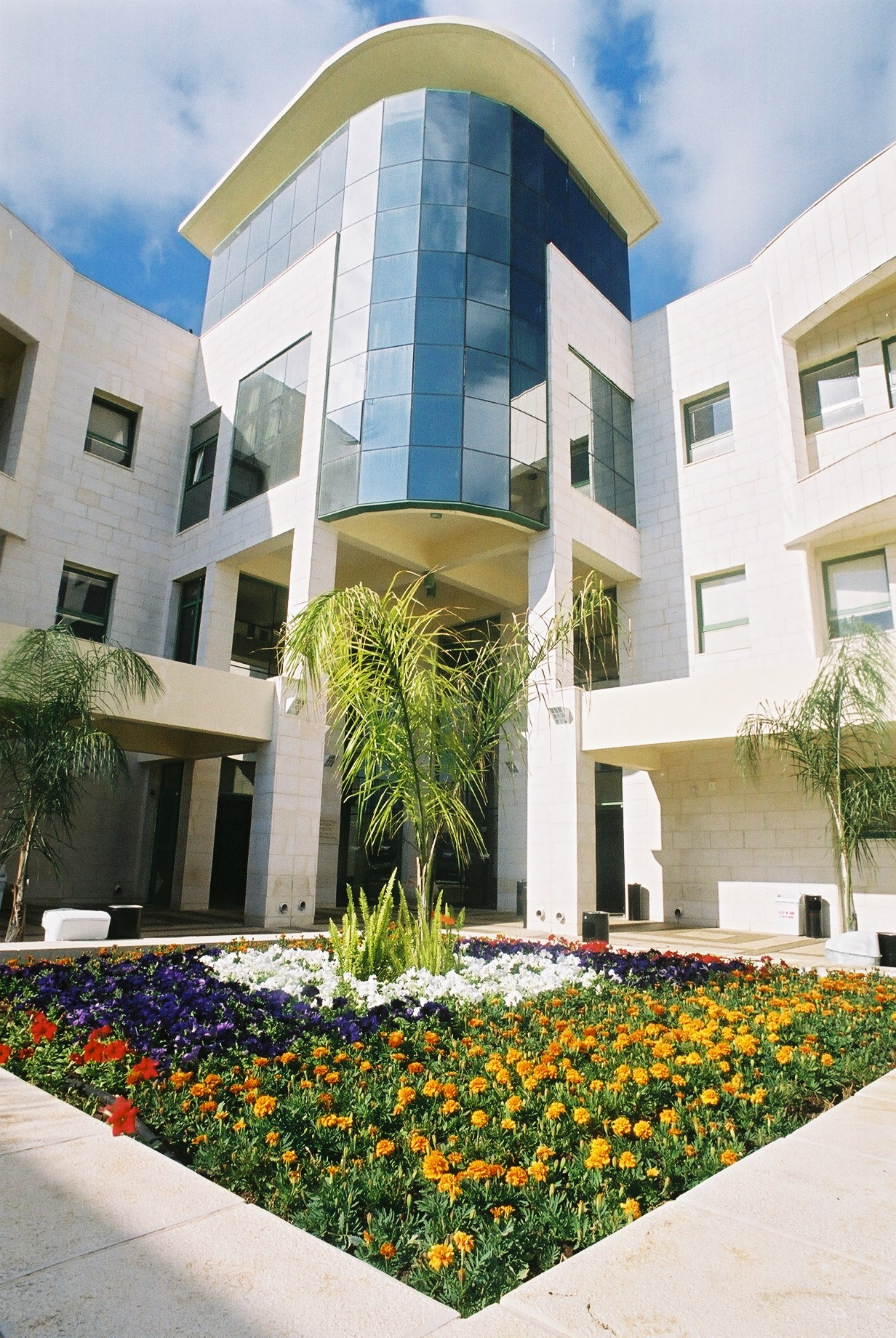
Braude College of Engineering

In Israel, any non-university higher-learning facility is called a college. Institutions accredited by the Council for Higher Education in Israel (CHE) to confer a bachelor's degree are called "academic colleges" (Hebrew: מִכְלָלָה, romanized: Mikhlala; plural Hebrew: מכללות, romanized: Mikhlalot). These colleges (at least 4 for 2012) may also offer master's degrees and act as research facilities. There are also over twenty teacher training colleges or seminaries, most of which may award only a Bachelor of Education (BEd) degree.

- Academic colleges: Any educational facility that had been approved to offer at least bachelor's degree is entitled by CHE to use the term "academic college" in its name.
- Engineering academic college: Any academic facility that offers at least a bachelor's degree and most of it faculties are providing an engineering degree and engineering license.
- Educational academic college: After an educational facility that had been approved for "teachers seminar" status is then approved to provide a Bachelor of Education, its name is changed to include "educational academic college."
- Technical college: A "technical college" (מכללה טכנולוגית) is an educational facility that is approved to allow to provide P.E. degree (הנדסאי; 14'th class) or technician (טכנאי; 13'th class) diploma and licenses.
- Training College: A "training college" (מכללה להכשרה or מכללה מקצועית) is an educational facility that provides basic training allowing a person to receive a working permit in a field such as alternative medicine, cooking, art, mechanic, electrician and other professions. A trainee could receive the right to work in certain professions as apprentice (j. mechanic, j. electrician etc.). After working in the training field for enough time, an apprentice can receive a license to operate as mechanic or electrician) This educational facility is mostly used to provide basic training for low tech jobs and for job seekers without any training that are provided by the nation's Employment Service (שירות התעסוקה).

==== Macau ====
Following the Portuguese usage, the term "college" (colégio) in Macau has traditionally been used in the names for private (and non-governmental) pre-university educational institutions, which correspond to form one to form six level tiers. Such schools are usually run by the Roman Catholic church or missionaries in Macau. Examples include Chan Sui Ki Perpetual Help College, Yuet Wah College, and Sacred Heart Canossian College.

==== Philippines ====
In the Philippines, colleges usually refer to institutions of learning that grant degrees but whose scholastic fields are not as diverse as that of a university (University of Santo Tomas, University of the Philippines, Ateneo de Manila University, De La Salle University, Far Eastern University, and AMA University), such as the San Beda College which specializes in law, AMA Computer College whose campuses are spread all over the Philippines which specializes in information and computing technologies, and the Mapúa Institute of Technology which specializes in engineering, or to component units within universities that do not grant degrees but rather facilitate the instruction of a particular field, such as a College of Science and College of Engineering, among many other colleges of the University of the Philippines.

A state college may not have the word "college" in its name but may have several component colleges or departments. Thus, the Eulogio Amang Rodriguez Institute of Science and Technology is classified as a state college.

Usually, the term "college" is also thought of as a hierarchical demarcation between the term "university", and quite a number of colleges seek to be recognized as universities as a sign of improvement in academic standards (Colegio de San Juan de Letran, San Beda College), and increase in the diversity of the offered degree programs (called "courses"). For private colleges, this may be done through a survey and evaluation by the Commission on Higher Education and accrediting organizations, as was the case of Urios College which is now the Fr. Saturnino Urios University. For state colleges, it is usually done by a legislation by the Congress or Senate. In common usage, "going to college" simply means attending school for an undergraduate degree, whether it's from an institution recognized as a college or a university.

When it comes to referring to the level of education, college is the term more used to be synonymous to tertiary or higher education. A student who is or has studied his/her undergraduate degree at either an institution with college or university in its name is considered to be going to or have gone to college.

==== Singapore ====
The term "college" in Singapore is generally only used for pre-university educational institutions called "Junior Colleges", which provide the final two years of secondary education (equivalent to sixth form in British terms or grades 11–12 in the American system). Since 1 January 2005, the term also refers to the three campuses of the Institute of Technical Education with the introduction of the "collegiate system", in which the three institutions are called ITE College East, ITE College Central, and ITE College West respectively.

The term "university" is used to describe higher-education institutions offering locally conferred degrees. Institutions offering diplomas are called "polytechnics", while other institutions are often referred to as "institutes" and so forth.

==== Sri Lanka ====
There are several professional and vocational institutions that offer post-secondary education without granting degrees that are referred to as "colleges". This includes the Sri Lanka Law College, the many Technical Colleges and Teaching Colleges.

In Sri Lanka the word "college" (known as Vidyalaya in Sinhala) normally refers to a secondary school, which usually signifies above the 5th standard. During the British colonial period a limited number of exclusive secondary schools were established based on English public school model (Royal College Colombo, S. Thomas' College, Mount Lavinia, Trinity College, Kandy) these along with several Catholic schools (St. Joseph's College, Colombo, St Anthony's College) traditionally carry their name as colleges. Following the start of free education in 1931 large group of central colleges were established to educate the rural masses. Since Sri Lanka gained Independence in 1948, many schools that have been established have been named as "college".

==== Turkey ====
In Turkey, the term "kolej" (college) refers to a private high school, typically preceded by one year of preparatory language education. Notable Turkish colleges include Robert College, Uskudar American Academy, American Collegiate Institute and Tarsus American College.

=== Africa ===
==== South Africa ====
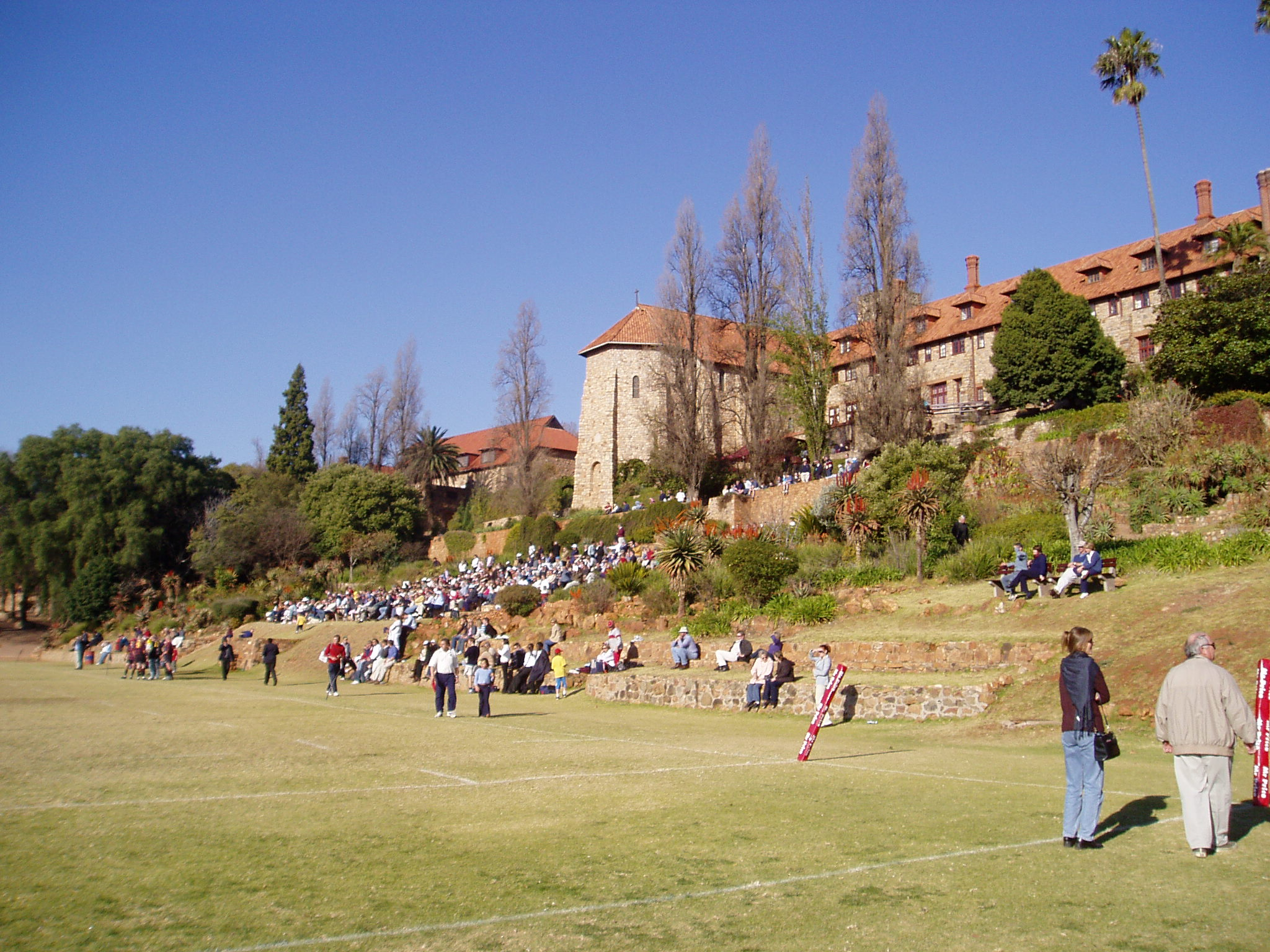
St John's College, Johannesburg, a boys' school in South Africa

Although the term "college" is hardly used in any context at any university in South Africa, some non-university tertiary institutions call themselves colleges. These include teacher training colleges, business colleges and wildlife management colleges. See: List of universities in South Africa#Private colleges and universities; List of post secondary institutions in South Africa.

Some secondary schools, especially private schools on the English public school model, have "college" in their title, including six of South Africa's Elite Seven high schools. A typical example of this category would be St John's College. Private schools that specialize in improving children's marks through intensive focus on examination needs are informally called "cram-colleges".

==== Zimbabwe ====
The term college is mainly used by private or independent secondary schools with Advanced Level (Upper 6th formers) and also Polytechnic Colleges which confer diplomas only. A student can complete secondary education (International General Certificate of Secondary Education, IGCSE) at 16 years and proceed straight to a poly-technical college or they can proceed to Advanced level (16 to 19 years) and obtain a General Certificate of Education (GCE) certificate which enables them to enroll at a university, provided they have good grades. Alternatively, with lower grades, the GCE certificate holders will have an added advantage over their GCSE counterparts if they choose to enroll at a polytechnical college. Some schools in Zimbabwe choose to offer the International Baccalaureate studies as an alternative to the IGCSE and GCE.

=== Europe ===
==== Greece ====
Kollegio (in Greek Κολλέγιο) refers to the Centers of Post-Lyceum Education (in Greek Κέντρο Μεταλυκειακής Εκπαίδευσης, abbreviated as KEME), which are principally private and belong to the Greek post-secondary education system. Some of them have links to EU or US higher education institutions or accreditation organizations, such as the NEASC. Kollegio (or Kollegia in plural) may also refer to private non-tertiary schools, such as the Athens College.

==== Ireland ====
Parliament Square, Trinity College Dublin in Ireland

In Ireland the term "college" is normally used to describe an institution of tertiary education. University students often say they attend "college" rather than "university". Until 1989, no university provided teaching or research directly; they were formally offered by a constituent college of the university.

There are number of secondary education institutions that traditionally used the word "college" in their names: these are either older, private schools (such as Belvedere College, Gonzaga College, Castleknock College, and St. Michael's College) or what were formerly a particular kind of secondary school. These secondary schools, formerly known as "technical colleges," were renamed "community colleges," but remain secondary schools.

The country's only ancient university is the University of Dublin. Created during the reign of Elizabeth I, it is modelled on the collegiate universities of Cambridge and Oxford. However, only one constituent college was ever founded, hence the curious position of Trinity College Dublin today; although both are usually considered one and the same, the university and college are completely distinct corporate entities with separate and parallel governing structures.

Among more modern foundations, the National University of Ireland, founded in 1908, consisted of constituent colleges and recognised colleges until 1997. The former are now referred to as constituent universities – institutions that are essentially universities in their own right. The National University can trace its existence back to 1850 and the creation of the Queen's University of Ireland and the creation of the Catholic University of Ireland in 1854. From 1880, the degree awarding roles of these two universities was taken over by the Royal University of Ireland, which remained until the creation of the National University in 1908 and Queen's University Belfast.

The state's two new universities, Dublin City University and University of Limerick, were initially National Institute for Higher Education institutions. These institutions offered university level academic degrees and research from the start of their existence and were awarded university status in 1989 in recognition of this.

Third level technical education in the state has been carried out in the Institutes of Technology, which were established from the 1970s as Regional Technical Colleges. These institutions have delegated authority which entitles them to give degrees and diplomas from Quality and Qualifications Ireland (QQI) in their own names.

A number of private colleges exist such as Dublin Business School, providing undergraduate and postgraduate courses validated by QQI and in some cases by other universities.

Other types of college include colleges of education, such as the Church of Ireland College of Education. These are specialist institutions, often linked to a university, which provide both undergraduate and postgraduate academic degrees for people who want to train as teachers.

A number of state-funded further education colleges exist – which offer vocational education and training in a range of areas from business studies and information and communications technology to sports injury therapy. These courses are usually one, two or less often three years in duration and are validated by QQI at Levels 5 or 6, or for the BTEC Higher National Diploma award, which is a Level 6/7 qualification, validated by Edexcel. There are numerous private colleges (particularly in Dublin and Limerick) which offer both further and higher education qualifications. These degrees and diplomas are often certified by foreign universities/international awarding bodies and are aligned to the National Framework of Qualifications at Levels 6, 7 and 8.

==== Netherlands ====
In the Netherlands there are 3 main educational routes after high school.

- MBO (middle-level applied education), which is the equivalent of junior college. Designed to prepare students for either skilled trades and technical occupations and workers in support roles in professions such as engineering, accountancy, business administration, nursing, medicine, architecture, and criminology or for additional education at another college with more advanced academic material.
- HBO (higher professional education), which is the equivalent of college and has a professional orientation. After HBO (typically 4–6 years), pupils can enroll in a (professional) master's program (1–2 years) or enter the job market. The HBO is taught in vocational universities (hogescholen), of which there are over 40 in the Netherlands, each of which offers a broad variety of programs, with the exception of some that specialize in arts or agriculture. Note that the hogescholen are not allowed to name themselves university in Dutch. This also stretches to English and therefore HBO institutions are known as universities of applied sciences.
- WO (Scientific education), which is the equivalent to university level education and has an academic orientation.

HBO graduates can be awarded two titles, which are Baccalaureus (bc.) and Ingenieur (ing.). At a WO institution, many more bachelor's and master's titles can be awarded. Bachelor's degrees: Bachelor of Arts (BA), Bachelor of Science (BSc) and Bachelor of Laws (LLB). Master's degrees: Master of Arts (MA), Master of Laws (LLM) and Master of Science (MSc). The PhD title is a research degree awarded upon completion and defense of a doctoral thesis.

==== Portugal ====
Presently in Portugal, the term colégio (college) is normally used as a generic reference to a private (non-government) school that provides from basic to secondary education. Many of the private schools include the term colégio in their name. Some special public schools – usually of the boarding school type – also include the term in their name, with a notable example being the Colégio Militar (Military College). The term colégio interno (literally "internal college") is used specifically as a generic reference to a boarding school.

Until the 19th century, a colégio was usually a secondary or pre-university school, of public or religious nature, where the students usually lived together. A model for these colleges was the Royal College of Arts and Humanities, founded in Coimbra by King John III of Portugal in 1542.

==== United Kingdom ====
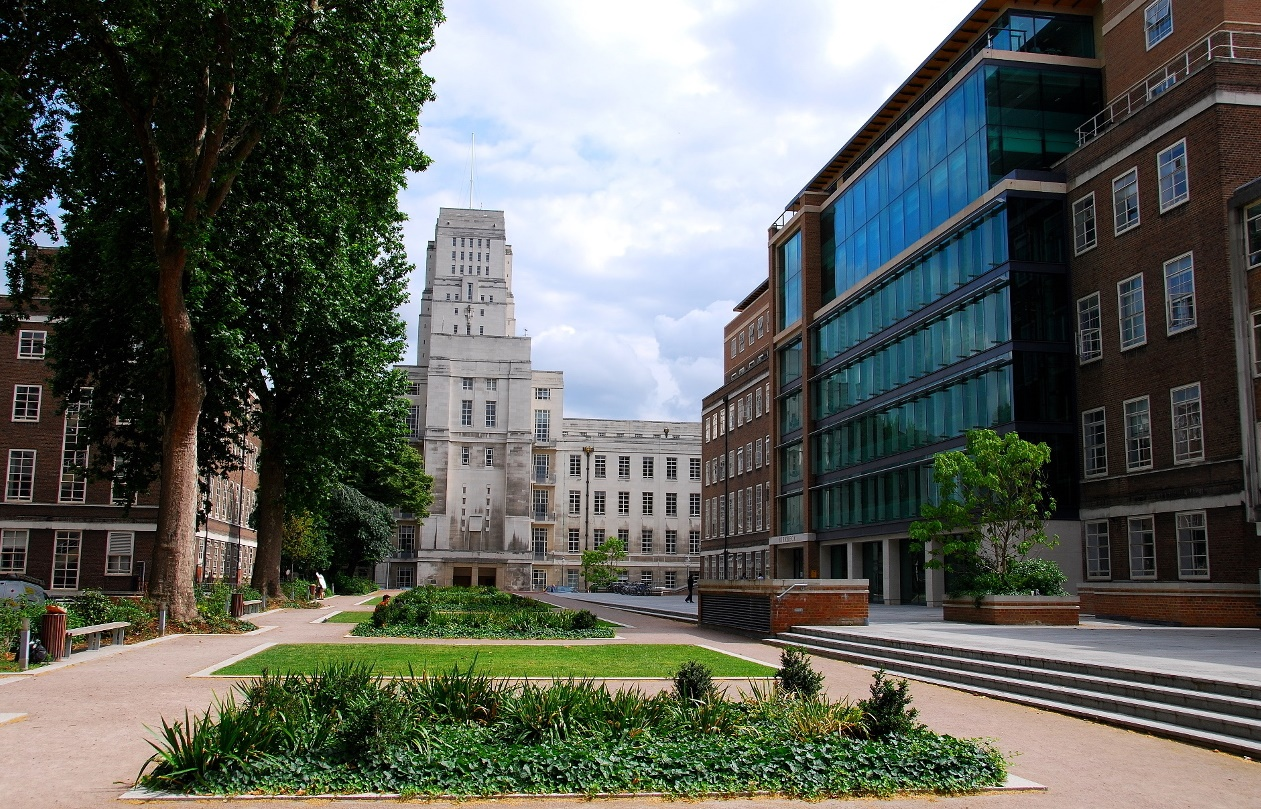
Birkbeck, University of London

===== Secondary education and further education =====
Further education (FE) colleges and sixth form colleges are institutions providing further education to students over 16. Some of these also provide higher education courses (see below). In the context of secondary education, 'college' is used in the names of some private schools, e.g. Eton College and Winchester College.

===== Higher education =====
In higher education, a college is normally a provider that does not hold university status, although it can also refer to a constituent part of a collegiate or federal university or a grouping of academic faculties or departments within a university. Traditionally the distinction between colleges and universities was that colleges did not award degrees while universities did, but this is no longer the case with NCG having gained taught degree awarding powers (the same as some universities) on behalf of its colleges, and many of the colleges of the University of London holding full degree awarding powers and being effectively universities. Most colleges, however, do not hold their own degree awarding powers and continue to offer higher education courses that are validated by universities or other institutions that can award degrees.

In England, as of August 2016, over 60% of the higher education providers directly funded by HEFCE (208/340) are sixth-form or further education colleges, often termed colleges of further and higher education, along with 17 colleges of the University of London, one university college, 100 universities, and 14 other providers (six of which use 'college' in their name). Overall, this means over two-thirds of state-supported higher education providers in England are colleges of one form or another. Many private providers are also called colleges, e.g. the New College of the Humanities and St Patrick's College, London.

Colleges within universities vary immensely in their responsibilities. The large constituent colleges of the University of London are effectively universities in their own right; colleges in some universities, including those of the University of the Arts London and smaller colleges of the University of London, run their own degree courses but do not award degrees; those at the University of Roehampton provide accommodation and pastoral care as well as delivering the teaching on university courses; those at Oxford and Cambridge deliver some teaching on university courses as well as providing accommodation and pastoral care; and those in Durham, Kent, Lancaster and York provide accommodation and pastoral care but do not normally participate in formal teaching. The legal status of these colleges also varies widely, with University of London colleges being independent corporations and recognised bodies, Oxbridge colleges, colleges of the University of the Highlands and Islands (UHI) and some Durham colleges being independent corporations and listed bodies, most Durham colleges being owned by the university but still listed bodies, and those of other collegiate universities not having formal recognition. When applying for undergraduate courses through UCAS, University of London colleges are treated as independent providers, colleges of Oxford, Cambridge, Durham and UHI are treated as locations within the universities that can be selected by specifying a 'campus code' in addition to selecting the university, and colleges of other universities are not recognised.

The UHI and the University of Wales Trinity Saint David (UWTSD) both include further education colleges. However, while the UHI colleges integrate FE and HE provision, UWTSD maintains a separation between the university campuses (Lampeter, Carmarthen and Swansea) and the two colleges (Coleg Sir Gâr and Coleg Ceredigion; n.b. coleg is Welsh for college), which although part of the same group are treated as separate institutions rather than colleges within the university.

A university college is an independent institution with the power to award taught degrees, but which has not been granted university status. University College is a protected title that can only be used with permission, although note that University College London, University College, Oxford and University College, Durham are colleges within their respective universities and not university colleges (in the case of UCL holding full degree awarding powers that set it above a university college), while University College Birmingham is a university in its own right and also not a university college.

=== Oceania ===
==== Australia ====
In Australia a college may be an institution of tertiary education that is smaller than a university, run independently or as part of a university. Following a reform in the 1980s many of the formerly independent colleges now belong to a larger universities.

Referring to parts of a university, there are residential colleges which provide residence for students, both undergraduate and postgraduate, called university colleges. These colleges often provide additional tutorial assistance, and some host theological study. Many colleges have strong traditions and rituals, so are a combination of dormitory style accommodation and fraternity or sorority culture.

Most technical and further education institutions (TAFEs), which offer certificate and diploma vocational courses, are styled "TAFE colleges" or "Colleges of TAFE". In some places, such as Tasmania, college refers to a type of school for Year 10, 11 and 12 students, e.g. Don College.

The term "college" is also applied to any private or independent (non-government) primary and, especially, secondary school as distinct from a state school. Melbourne Grammar School, Cranbrook School, Sydney and The King's School, Parramatta are considered colleges.

There has also been a recent trend to rename or create government secondary schools as "colleges". In the state of Victoria, some state high schools are referred to as secondary colleges, although the pre-eminent government secondary school for boys in Melbourne is still named Melbourne High School. In Western Australia, South Australia and the Northern Territory, "college" is used in the name of all state high schools built since the late 1990s, and also some older ones. In New South Wales, some high schools, especially multi-campus schools resulting from mergers, are known as "secondary colleges". In Queensland some newer schools which accept primary and high school students are styled state college, but state schools offering only secondary education are called "State High School". In Tasmania and the Australian Capital Territory, "college" refers to the final two years of high school (years 11 and 12), and the institutions which provide this. In this context, "college" is a system independent of the other years of high school. Here, the expression is a shorter version of matriculation college.

==== New Zealand ====
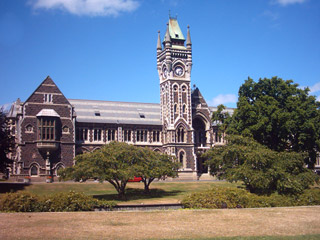
The University of Otago in New Zealand

The constituent colleges of the former University of New Zealand (such as Canterbury University College) have become independent universities. Some halls of residence associated with New Zealand universities retain the name of "college", particularly at the University of Otago (which although brought under the umbrella of the University of New Zealand, already possessed university status and degree awarding powers). The institutions formerly known as "Teacher-training colleges" now style themselves "College of education".

Some universities, such as the University of Canterbury, have divided their university into constituent administrative "Colleges" – the College of Arts containing departments that teach Arts, Humanities and Social Sciences, College of Science containing Science departments, and so on. This is largely modelled on the Cambridge model, discussed above.

Like the United Kingdom some professional bodies in New Zealand style themselves as "colleges", for example, the Royal Australasian College of Surgeons, the Royal Australasian College of Physicians.

The word "college" can also refer to a secondary school for ages 13 to 17 and "college" appears as part of the name especially of private or integrated schools. "Colleges" most frequently appear in the North Island, whereas "high schools" are more common in the South Island. But in all parts of the country many secondary schools have "College" in their name, such as Rangitoto College, New Zealand's largest secondary school.

== See also ==
- Community college
- Residential college
- University college
- Vocational university
- Madrasa
- Ashrama (stage)
