= Green College =

Green College may refer to:

- Green College, Oxford
- Green College, University of British Columbia
