= Residential college =

Student residence and academic community

A residential college is a division of a university that places academic activity in a community setting of students and faculty, usually at a residence and with shared meals, the college having a degree of autonomy and a federated relationship with the overall university. The term residential college is also used to describe a variety of other patterns, ranging from a hall of residence with some academic programming, to continuing education programs for adults lasting a few days. In some parts of the world it simply refers to any organized on-campus housing, an example being University of Malaya.

== Various models ==
A prominent model for residential colleges is the Oxbridge model at the University of Oxford and University of Cambridge, where the colleges are legally independent constituents of the universities that are both residential and teaching institutions. This model was modified at Durham University, also in the UK, in the 19th century to create non-teaching colleges that were, in general, legally part of the university, but with a few independent colleges added in the 20th century. With the arrival of residential colleges in the United States the model diversified further. The Durham adaptation of colleges being owned by the university rather than being independent corporations is generally followed and many universities, including Yale and Harvard, also follow Durham in keeping teaching centralised.

There is also a split between fully collegiate universities (e.g., Oxford and other British universities, where all students, undergraduate and postgraduate, are members of a college), universities that are fully collegiate at the undergraduate level (e.g., Yale and Princeton where all undergraduates are members of a college throughout their time at university, even if they don't remain in residence) and those (e.g., Northwestern, Sydney or Waterloo) where residential colleges are one of a mix of residential options. Another variant at some US universities is residential colleges that do not cover all years at the institute, e.g., Cornell University's West Campus House System, which only takes sophomores and above, with most upperclass students either living off campus or in halls unaffiliated with the residential colleges. Another point of variance is whether colleges are multi-disciplinary (as at Oxford and Cambridge) or focused on certain subject areas such as at Fordham University, which has dedicated residential colleges (Integrated Learning Communities) for upperclass students for various themes including global business and science, as well as separate first year residential colleges, including one for students considering pre-med or science majors.

The primary difference between a residential college and a hall of residence is often considered to be that while a student lives in a hall for a year, they are a member of a college for their entire student life, even when not living in the accommodation associated with that college: "Residential colleges are collegia in the original sense: societies, not buildings, and their members may reside anywhere". However, as can be seen above, this is not common to all variants of the residential college system. In addition, the members of a residential college are usually expected to eat their meals together, as a unified body. Standard halls of residence tend to have residents who move between halls every year, and who eat in dining halls largely mixed with residents of other halls. However, residential colleges can be self-catering (e.g. Josephine Butler College, Durham), yet still clearly identified as colleges.

== Australia ==
In Australia, colleges perform different functions at different universities. Colleges at the University of Melbourne, University of Sydney, University of Queensland, University of Adelaide, University of Tasmania and the University of Western Australia provide academic, sporting and cultural programs in addition to those offered by their parent institution and each individual college has its own personality, history and traditions. However, they only serve a small fraction of the university population. By point of comparison, the colleges at the Australian National University provide a mix of the above and a singular focus on the provision of accommodation and Monash University provides a college experience, but mostly without any academic support, the exception is the affiliated Mannix College.

St Catherine's College in Western Australia is the first residential college in Australia to have a campus at two universities - the University of Western Australia and Curtin University.

== Canada ==
Many universities in Canada have collegiate systems similar to those in British collegiate universities. For instance, the University of Toronto has a well-established collegiate system including a number of "federated colleges" and "constituent colleges". Initially, the University of Victoria maintained a system of residential colleges (including Craigdarroch College and Lansdowne College) built around central courtyards, before adopting a more centralized residential system which is now made up of Permanent Halls (e.g., Ring Road Hall) and Common Rooms. Other Canadian universities with residential colleges include the University of Waterloo, the University of Western Ontario, the University of Manitoba, the University of British Columbia, Trent University and its colleges, Paton College at Memorial University of Newfoundland, and York University. Three Canadian residential colleges are distinguished by being for graduate students rather than undergraduates — Green College, Vancouver and St. John's College, Vancouver colleges at UBC, and Massey College, Toronto at the University of Toronto.

== New Zealand ==
The University of Otago in Dunedin has a particular strong set of colleges modelled on the Oxbridge system. Each of Otago's 15 colleges has its own distinctive 'personality', history, and traditions.

== United Kingdom and Ireland ==
Collegiate structures in the United Kingdom and Ireland follow a variety of models. In Oxford and Cambridge, a residential college combines both the residential and part of the academic aspects of the university in one location. "Tutorials" (Oxford) or "supervisions" (Cambridge) are generally given within the college, but lectures are organised by the wider university. In most universities in the UK with residential colleges – Durham (from the 19th century) along with Kent, Lancaster and York (from the 1960s) – formal teaching is carried out only in academic departments. Their colleges are primarily residential and the focus for social and sporting activities, as well as for student welfare. In these universities, the colleges are (with the exception of two early 20th century colleges at Durham) owned by their parent university; this is also the case for three of the newer colleges at Oxford, which are formally "societies" of the university. The University of Roehampton has four colleges (all founded in the 19th century) that joined to form the university. The teaching of the university takes place within the colleges, with academic departments being associated with a particular college. Roehampton colleges are, therefore, both residential and academic, but with the academic organisation on very different lines from Oxford and Cambridge. The University of London and the University of the Highlands and Islands are federal universities whose colleges are independent teaching institutes (some, in the case of London, being universities in their own right) rather than residential colleges. The University of the Arts London is similarly organised, with six constituent teaching colleges, except that these are all owned by the central university rather than being joined in a federal structure.

The University of Dublin (founded 1592) in Ireland has only one constituent college, Trinity College Dublin, which is thus effectively the whole university rather than a residential college. Occasionally, unsuccessful proposals have been made for the university to expand by incorporating the existing University College Dublin as a second college.

The University of St Andrews in Scotland contains three colleges, but these have neither a teaching nor residential role. However, the university announced plans to create a fourth college in 2022.

== United States ==
In the United States, as in many collegiate universities in the UK, the academic and residential functions of the residential college system are normally separated, with the colleges primarily as residential and social units. Although residential colleges in some universities offer some classes, these offerings supplement the offerings of the major academic which have separate facilities. Other US institutions not mentioned above that have residential colleges include Binghamton University,Furman University, Murray State University, Rice University, Washington University in St. Louis, University of Miami, Central Michigan University, Southern Methodist University, the University of Oklahoma, the University of California, San Diego, and the University of California, Santa Cruz. Many other institutions use the system as well. At the University of Virginia, students may apply to live in one of three residential colleges; acceptance rates vary widely. In 2001 Vanderbilt University decided to convert to a residential college system. Since that time, Vanderbilt has built and renovated residential facilities to suit this program, including The Commons for first-year students and several colleges for upper class students. At UC Santa Cruz and San Diego, all majors are available to students of any college, but each college has its own curricular requirements, especially with regard to general education.

== See also ==
- List of residential colleges
- University college
- Collegiate university
- House system
- Colleges within universities in the United Kingdom
