= Alison Wearing =

Canadian writer and performer (born 1967)

Alison Wearing (born 1967) is a Canadian writer and performer most noted for her memoir and solo play, Confessions of a Fairy's Daughter.

Wearing, born in Peterborough, Ontario, studied French, music, and political science across various universities in Canada and Germany. She began her writing career in Prague, publishing articles, stories, and winning awards for her travel writing. Her first book, Honeymoon in Purdah, a travel memoir about her trip to Iran, received international acclaim. After relocating to Mexico in 2002, she ventured into performing arts, winning awards for her solo play Giving Into Light. Confessions of a Fairy's Daughter, a memoir and solo play, shares her experience growing up with a gay father in the 1980s. Her 2020 book, Moments of Glad Grace, explores the relationship between a daughter and her aging father. Wearing has held various literary positions, including writer-in-residence and distinguished visiting fellow, and facilitates Memoir Writing Ink, an online writing program.

== Early years and education ==
Wearing was born in Peterborough, Ontario, in 1967. Her mother and father were both pianists and Wearing speaks of music as her "mother tongue". Wearing's father, Joseph Wearing, was also a professor of political studies at Trent University. Alison Wearing left high school in Canada to study French at the University of Nantes. She returned to Canada to study music at the University of Western Ontario, then political science at Wilfrid Laurier University and the University of Marburg, Germany.

== Career ==
Wearing's writing career began with articles and stories written while living in Prague, where she taught English to members of Václav Havel's first post-revolutionary government of Czechoslovakia. Her first short story, "Notes From Under Water", was published first in the Queen's Quarterly and then selected for the Journey Prize Anthology (McClelland and Stewart, 1994). "Staring Down the Beast", a longform essay about travels in Serbia during the Balkan War, won the 1994 Canadian National Magazine Award Gold Medal for Travel Writing. "Solitary Motion", an essay about travels in northwestern China, won the 1995 Western Canada Magazine Award 1st Prize, also for Travel Writing.

Wearing's first book was the internationally acclaimed travel memoir, Honeymoon in Purdah (Alfred A. Knopf Canada, 2000), her account of a trip to Iran. The Calgary Sun called it "the perfect travel memoir" and the Ottawa Citizen hailed it as "one of the best pieces of travel writing it has been my privilege to read in this, or any, millennium". The book was published in seven countries.

After moving to central Mexico in 2002, Wearing turned her attention to the performing arts, singing, recording and touring with world/folk musician Jarmo Jalava, and studying dance and choreography. Her first solo play, Giving Into Light, combines literary chronicles with music and dance. It toured Canadian fringe festivals, where it won two Best of Fest awards, Best Drama, and was a finalist for Best Fringe Production of 2012 (CBC/CTV/CVV).

Confessions of a Fairy's Daughter, is both a memoir (Alfred A. Knopf Canada, 2013) and a solo play. Autobiographical in nature, Confessions of a Fairy's Daughter tells the story of growing up with a gay father in Peterborough, Canada, in the 1980s. The memoir was nominated for the RBC/Taylor Prize for Non-Fiction, shortlisted for the Edna Staebler Award for Creative Nonfiction, and named one of the top 50 Books of 2013 by Indigo Books.

Moments of Glad Grace (ECW Press) was published in 2020. "This is a wise, funny, and tender book, beautifully written and perfectly executed from first to last sentence. It's about a daughter and her ageing father, it's about genealogy and identity, it's about Ireland, but actually it's about how we love the ones we love. Moments of Glad Grace is a travelogue of the heart. It's a road you'll want to travel." – Yann Martel, author of Life of Pi.

Wearing has served as a juror for the Governor General's Award for English-language non-fiction, a reader for the CBC Literary Prize, a mentor for the University of Guelph MFA Creative Writing program, a faculty member of the Under The Volcano masterclass program, and writer-in-residence at Trent University, the University of Guelph, and Green College, University of British Columbia, where she has since been appointed a distinguished visiting fellow.

Wearing facilitates Memoir Writing Ink, an online writing program, and administers the International Amy MacRae Award for Memoir.

== Awards ==
Literature:

- 2014: Shortlisted for the Edna Staebler Award for Creative Non-Fiction
- 2014: Nominated for the RBC/Taylor Prize for Non-Fiction
- 2013: Top 50 Books of 2013, Indigo Books
- 1998: Western Canada Magazine Award 1st Prize
- 1995: National Magazine Award Gold Medal
- 1994: Finalist, Journey Prize

Theatre:

- 2013: Best Dramatic Script, United Solo Festival, New York City
- 2013: Critics' Choice Finalist, Vancouver Fringe Festival
- 2013: Best Drama, Victoria Fringe Festival
- 2013: Pick of the Fringe, Winnipeg Fringe Festival
- 2013: Outstanding Solo Show, CBC Manitoba
- 2012: Best of Fest, Stratford Springworks Festival
- 2012: Critics' Choice Finalist: Best Fringe Production of 2012
- 2012: Best of Fest, Fringetastic Festival
- 2011: Best of Fest, Wakefield Fringe Festival
- 2011: Best Drama, Victoria Fringe Festival
- 2010: Best of Fest, Wakefield Fringe Festival

== Bibliography ==
- "Notes From Under Water" Journey Prize Anthology 6, 1994, ISBN 978-0771044298
- Honeymoon in Purdah: an Iranian journey, 2001, ISBN 0-676-97362-0
- "My Life as a Shadow" Dropped Threads 2, edited by Carol Shields and Marjorie Anderson, 2003, ISBN 978-067-931206-2
- "The Motherhood Roadshow" AWOL: Tales for Travel-Inspired Minds, edited by Jennifer Barclay and Amy Logan, 2003, ISBN 978-067-931215-4
- Confessions of a Fairy's Daughter, 2013, ISBN 978-0-345-80757-1
- Moments of Glad Grace, 2020, ISBN 978-1770415133

== Plays ==
- Giving Into Light, directed by Stuart Cox, 2009
- Confessions of a Fairy's Daughter, directed by Stuart Cox, 2011
