= St. John's College, University of British Columbia =

Graduate residential college of the University of British Columbia

Coordinates: 49.26266°N 123.256833°W

St. John's College
- University of British Columbia
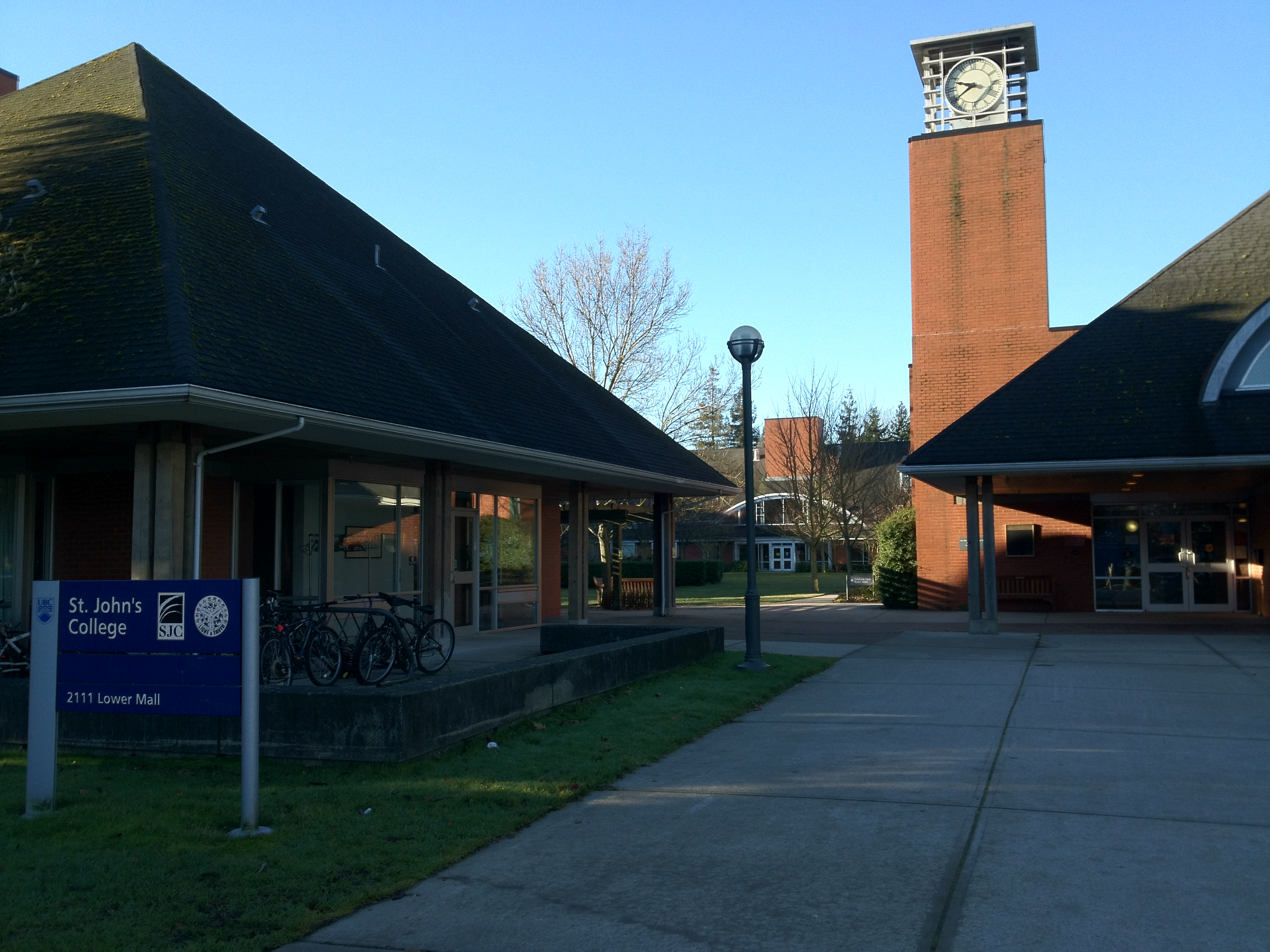
- Location: Vancouver, British Columbia, Canada
- Motto: "Light and Truth"
- Established: 1997; 29 years ago
- Principal: Henry Yu 余全毅
- Postgraduates: 165 graduate students
- Website: stjohns.ubc.ca

St. John's College, University of British Columbia
- Traditional Chinese: 聖約翰學院
- Simplified Chinese: 圣约翰学院
Transcriptions
Standard Mandarin
- Hanyu Pinyin: Shèng Yuēhàn Xuéyuàn

St. John's College is one of two graduate student residential colleges at the University of British Columbia which are modeled on the Oxbridge collegiate system, the other being Green College. It is a community for graduate students and postdoctoral researchers, with an international focus. St. John's College maintains close ties with Green College.

Currently the college consists of a residential community of 165 graduate students, postdoctoral researchers, and visiting scholars. The college is located at the West end of the UBC campus, near Wreck Beach. Aside from taking up residence at St. John's College, residential membership entails active involvement in the social and academic aspects of college life. Involvement takes the form of participation on various social and academic committees, and attendance at functions and lectures sponsored by or otherwise linked with the college. Dining together is an integral part of the St. John's College experience and the college motto is "The World Around Our Table."

On August 20, 2024, the Premier David Eby and Minister of Housing Ravi Kahlon of BC, along with UBC President Benoit-Antoine Bacon announced the joint funding partnership between the province of British Columbia and the University of British Columbia of a $560 million project—the single largest expansion of affordable student housing in the history of both UBC and in the province of British Columbia. To make way for this new development, the original structure was demolished from May to June 2026.

== History ==
St. John's College - UBC was founded by alumni of St. John's University, Shanghai, which was shut down by China in 1952. To keep the school's traditions alive, SJU alumni (called Johanneans) funded three academic institutions around the world bearing the name of St. John's. They established St. John's University in Taiwan in 1967 and St. John's College UBC in 1997.

== Activities ==
=== Academic Lectures and Interdisciplinary Groups ===
Residents regularly organize talks and forums on current events around the globe, building upon the college's international diversity as well as UBC's global scholarly expertise. These facilitate discussions surrounding difficult issues with an emphasis on maintaining a respectful tone for residents and guests.

=== Social and Community Activities ===
A diverse array of resident groups and committees are active at the college, such as: Academic Committee, Arts Committee, Environment Committee, Pride Collective, Sports Committee, Wellness Committee, Flag Committee and Language Tables.

=== UBC Community Hub ===
The college partners with other departments at UBC for initiatives like UBC Hot Lunch.

== Notable alumni ==
Dr. Mathabo Tsepa—High Commissioner of Lesotho to Canada
