= Green College, University of British Columbia =

Graduate residential college of the University of British Columbia

Green College
- University of British Columbia
- Location: Vancouver, British Columbia, Canada
- Coordinates: 49°16′15.53″N 123°15′21.77″W
- Motto: "Ideas and Friendship"
- Established: 1993; 33 years ago
- Colours: Gold and Green
- Principal: Emma Cunliffe
- Postgraduates: 84 graduate students, 16 postdoctoral scholars
- Affiliations: Green College at the Radcliffe Observatory of Oxford University, Cambridge University, AUCC; IAU, CIS, CWUAA
- Website: greencollege.ubc.ca

Green College is a graduate residential college and centre for interdisciplinary scholarship at the University of British Columbia founded by Cecil Howard Green and Ida Green.

The college consists of a residential community of nearly 100 graduate students, postdoctoral researchers, visiting scholars and professors, and non-resident affiliated faculty and academic programming. Green College is one of only three graduate residential colleges in Canada which are modelled on the Oxbridge system, the other two being St. John's College, University of British Columbia and Massey College, University of Toronto. Green College has formal ties with both institutions as well as with the University of Cambridge and Green Templeton College, Oxford, which similarly owes its inception to the generosity of Cecil H. Green.

The college is located at the North end of the UBC campus, near the Faculty of Law, Museum of Anthropology, Chan Centre for the Performing Arts, and the Buchanan complex. Cecil Green Park House is an oceanfront mansion adjoining the college property. Dining together is an integral part of the Green College experience. The college is home to the Green College Dining Society which provides ten meals a week to residents and guests in Graham House's Great Hall.

In 1997, Green College was evaluated as "[surpassing] goals" by an independent review committee. The college's "stimulating program" earned a Peter Larkin Graduate Program Award from UBC in 1998.

== History ==
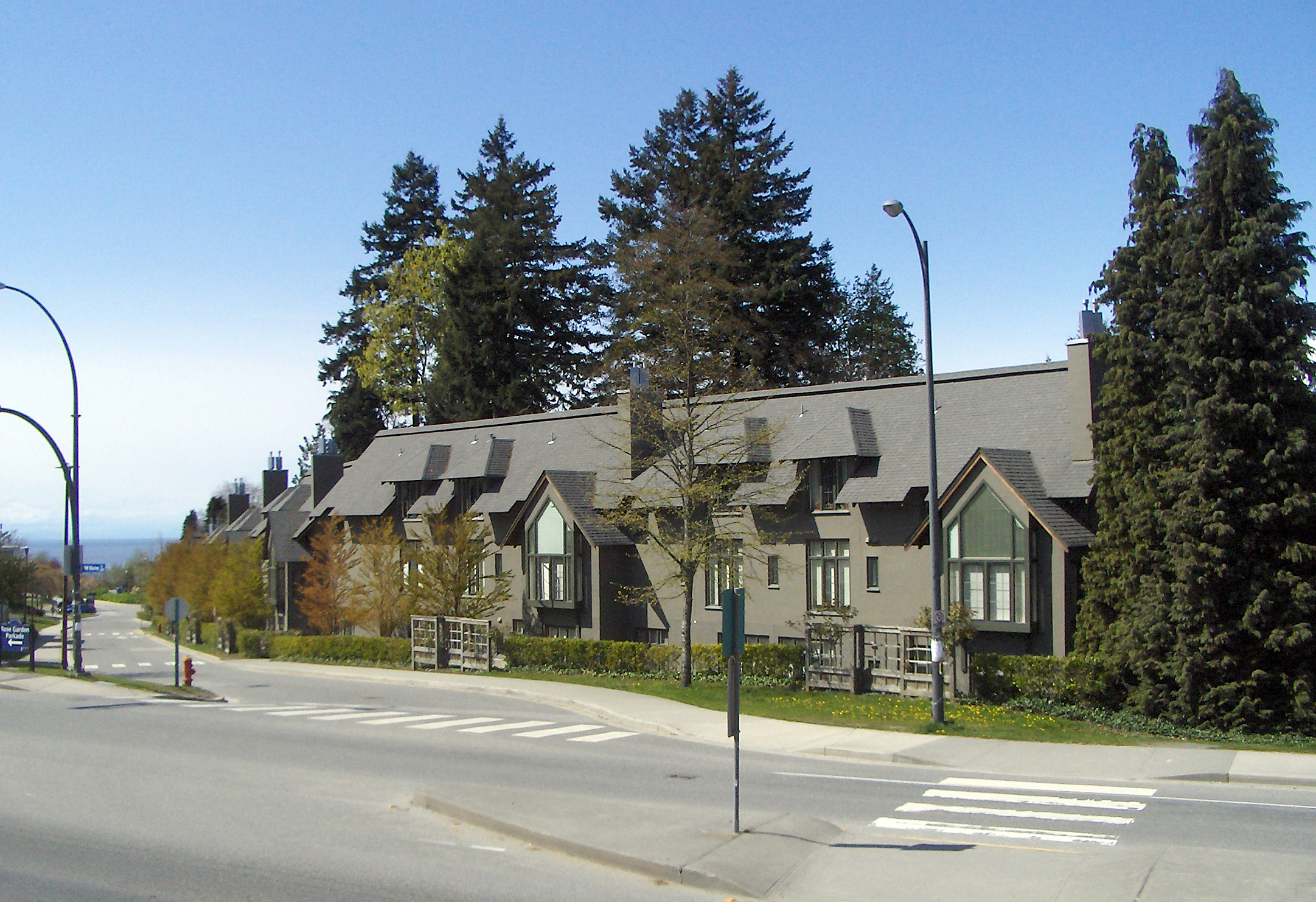
Green College residential buildings seen from the south. APEC protest banners were hung here in November, 1997.

Green College was established in 1993 thanks to a $7 million gift by Cecil H. Green and Ida Green, which was matched by the Province of British Columbia. This gift provided a home to the Cecil and Ida Green Visiting Professorship program, launched by the Greens in 1972.

=== History Prior to 1993 ===
The facilities of the college campus existed prior to the founding of the college.

In 1935, the Grand Campus Washout eroded a deep ravine across the east end of the grounds. After several days of erosion, the Gardener's shed collapsed into the ravine. Afterwards, the gully was filled with debris from a nearby landslide. The shed was not rebuilt. The landslide area can be identified today by the younger trees on the fill area and a sudden decrease in elevation where the fill has compacted.

The following year the campus drainage system was constructed, terminating in a spiral drain at the southwest end of the Cecil Green Park Road parking lot associated with the college. Two more minor erosion events occurred in the summer of 1995 and 1997 when the drainage system overloaded and flooded the parking lot. A berm was constructed to prevent a recurrence of these events. Slope stability and controlling further erosion continues to be a significant issue for all of the north end of campus including the college grounds.

=== Green College role in APEC meeting, 1997 ===
In November, 1997, the Asia-Pacific Economic Cooperation (APEC) meeting was held in Vancouver, with the final gathering at the Museum of Anthropology at UBC. Great controversy arose when politicians instructed RCMP officers to use force and pepper spray against non-violent protesters. Green College was located near the Museum of Anthropology, directly adjacent to the official motorcade route to the APEC venue there. Green College resident and Law student Craig Jones was arrested and held for 14 hours when he displayed signs reading simply "Free Speech", "Democracy", and "Human Rights" on College property. Green College residents displayed protest banners from the windows and walls of the college. Green College residents were among those doused by pepper spray by the RCMP. Also, starting six months before the APEC summit, Green College provided event space and logistical support for an "APEC-University Forum", to discuss both sides of issues raised.

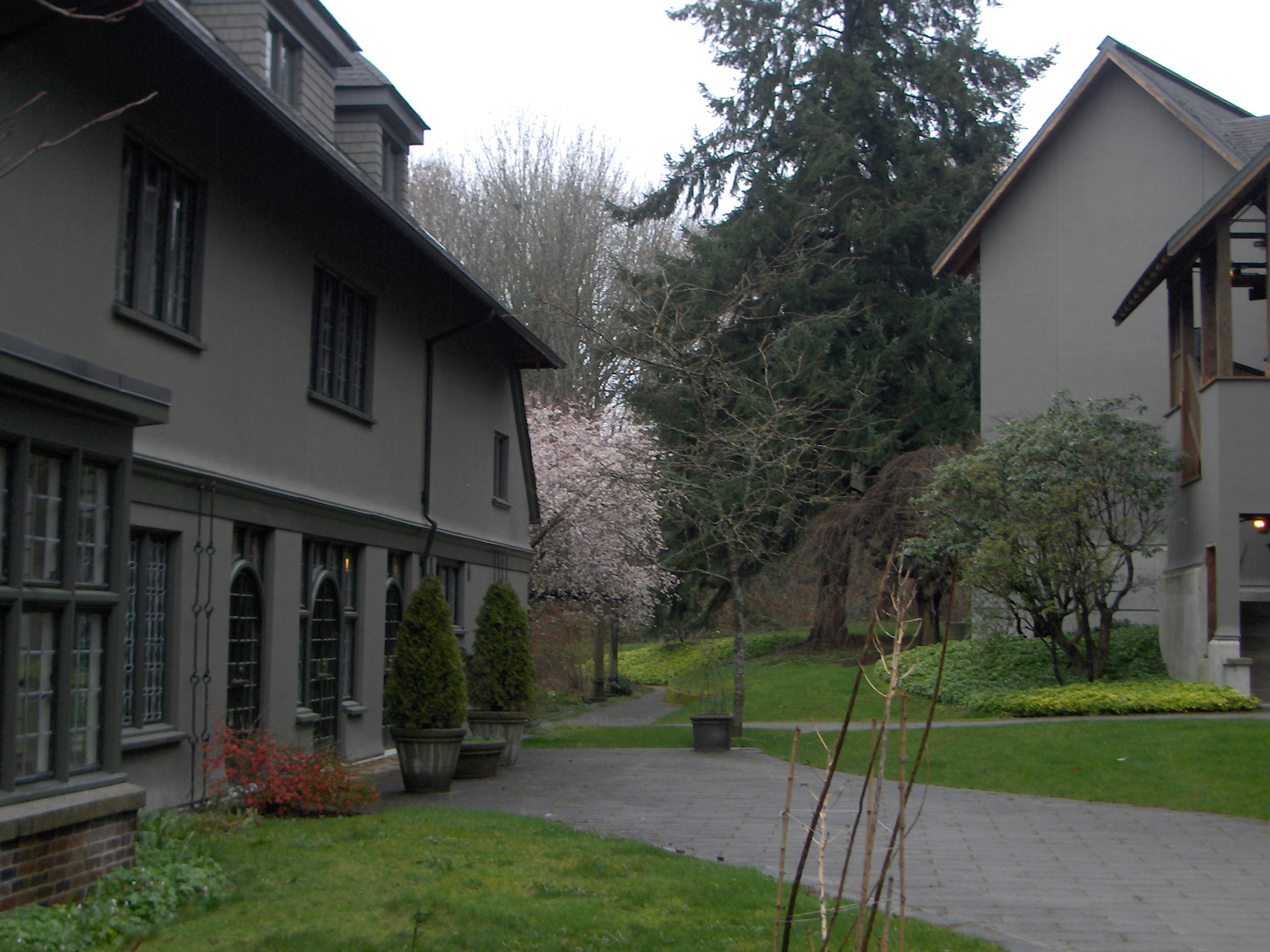
Graham House (left) and the A-North residential building (right).

=== Housing Contract controversy, 2006 ===
In order to pay for mounting maintenance costs, the college entered into an agreement with UBC Housing and Conferences during the 2005–2006 term for Housing to take over some of the administration of Green College. On 28 July 2006, residents received a new contract with terms that many residents found objectionable, with the order to sign the contract by 1 August 2006. Many residents did not sign the new contract. The deadline was pushed back several times, but eviction notices were given on 28 August to at least twenty-three of the residents.

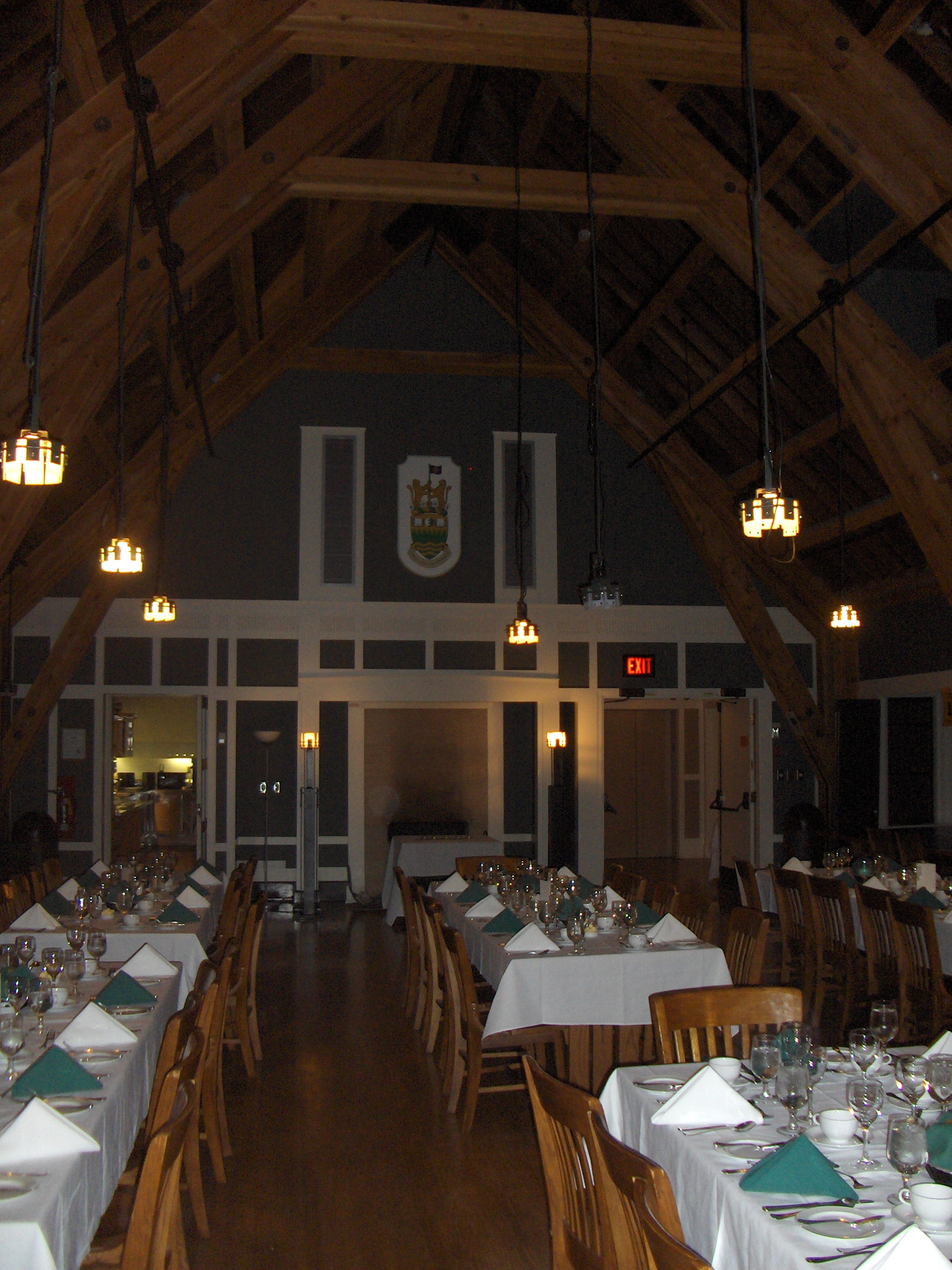
Great Hall, upstairs in Graham House.

== Mandate and Motto ==
The college's coat of arms features two cougars grasping a flagpole above a shield, and includes the college's motto "Ideas and Friendship". It was registered with the Canadian Heraldic Authority on January 15, 1996.

== Residency and Membership ==
Members of the college are selected through a membership committee.

Resident membership of Green College is open to UBC students who have been accepted into or are currently enrolled in a master's or doctoral degree program, UBC-appointed Postdoctoral Fellows and Visiting graduate students. A limited number of places are available each year to graduate students enrolled in degrees at other universities who have the status of Visiting Students or Visiting Scholars at UBC. Resident membership is not open to UBC faculty members.

== Activities ==
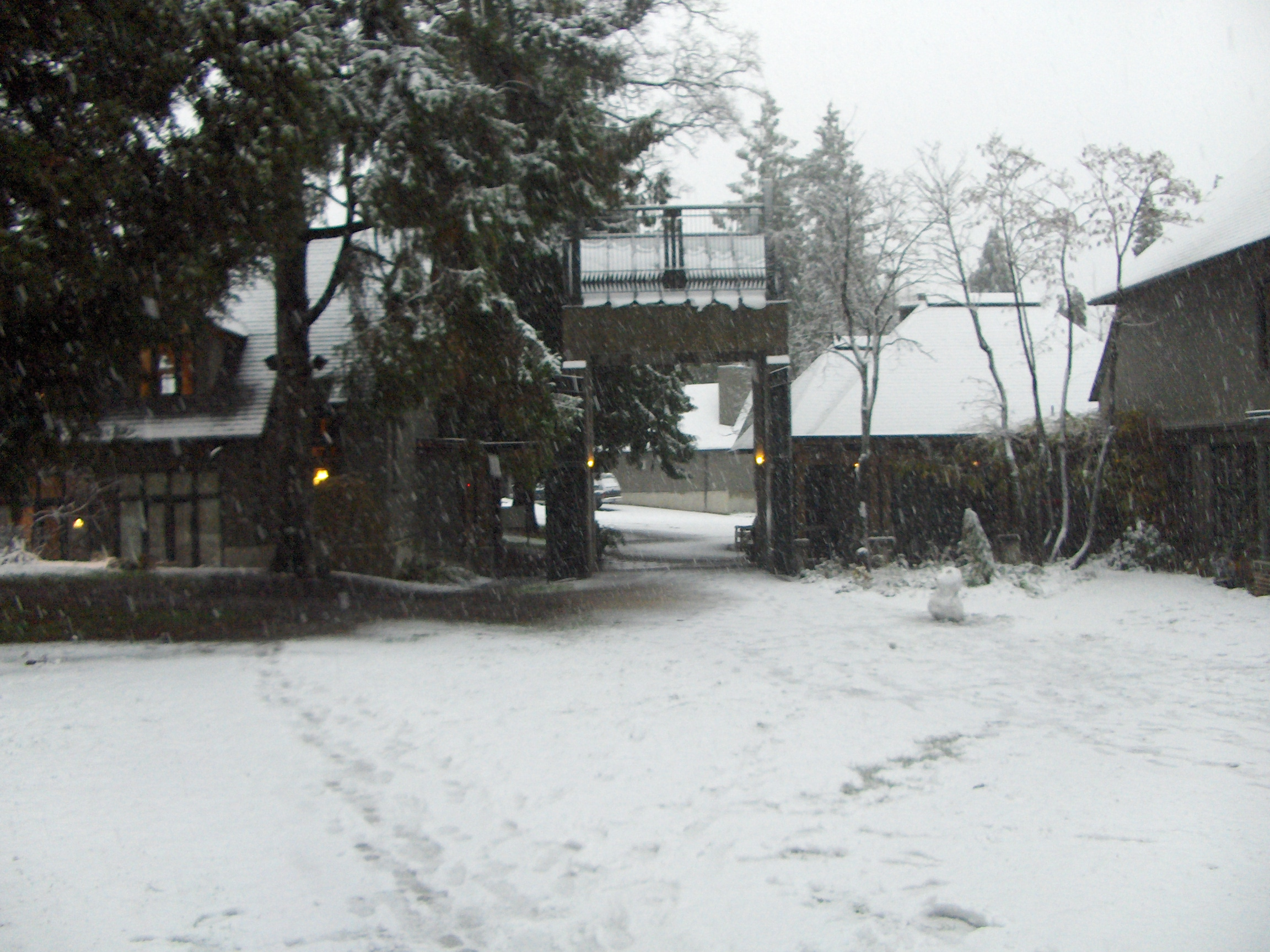
Main gate of Green College, University of British Columbia after a snowstorm

=== Endowed Professorships and Lectureships ===
Green College has a number of endowed lectures and visiting professors every year. A major goal of the Visiting Professorship program is to enhance the intellectual environment of Green College and to provide opportunities for graduate students and faculty at UBC to interact with outstanding scholars from other institutions.

==== Cecil H. and Ida Green Visiting Professor ====
Since the first Cecil H. and Ida Green Visiting professor, Nobel Laureate Gerhard Herzberg, arrived in 1972, more than 180 distinguished scholars have participated in the CIGVP program. Visiting professors, mainly nominated by a UBC faculty member and recently recommended by a resident member, are selected by the college's Academic Committee on the basis of academic excellence and appeal to a broad audience.

==== Richard V. Ericson Lecture ====
Richard V. Ericson (1948–2007), was Professor of Criminology and Sociology and Director of the Centre of Criminology at the University of Toronto. He was founding Principal of Green College (1993–2003). His many acclaimed publications spanned police work, crime reporting, risk and regulation, insurance and governance, and the sociology of knowledge. He was especially proud of his role in the creation of Green College at UBC as a unique combination of residential academic community and public venue for non-curricular, interdisciplinary inquiry. The Richard V. Ericson lecture series is held annually and invites lecturers of national or international reputation to speak on topics of broad interdisciplinary interest. It was inaugurated in 2011 by Andrew Coyne, National Editor of Maclean's Magazine. The lectures are partly funded from the Richard V. Ericson Lecture Endowment.

==== John V. Clyne Lecture ====
The John Clyne Lecture Program, now administered by Green College on behalf UBC, is made possible by an endowment created to honour John Valentine Clyne at the conclusion of his service as Chancellor of UBC in 1984. The purpose of the endowment is to provide public lectures by individuals with outstanding expertise in one or more of the fields, namely Government, Business, Law and the Arts.

=== Academic Lectures and Interdisciplinary Groups ===
Academic programming highlighting interdisciplinary research and topics is determined each academic year by the college's Academic Committee. Regular programming includes the Green College Special Series, organized by the Principal, each Tuesday, the Green College Members' Series each Monday featuring presentations from resident members of the college, and sometimes the Writer-in-Residence and Justice-in-Residence series. Every academic year, other interdisciplinary series at the college are offered, including Cosmology, Genomics and Society; Law and Society; Modernism and Its Discontents; Nature, History, and Society; Policy Issues in Postsecondary Education; Post-Colonial Research Cluster; Religion in the 21st Century; and Science and Society.

==== Writers-in-Residence ====
Since 2000 this programme has welcomed Canadian writers of all genres. The Writer-in-Residence works with the Green College community through consultations and workshops, and coordinates a reading series through the college's academic programming for the UBC community and beyond. Writer Gary Geddes reflected on his time at Green College as a "highlight of [his] literary career". Past writers in residence have included: Merilyn Simonds, Lynn Coady, Roo Borson, Wayde Compton, Karen Connelly, Nalo Hopkinson, Kevin Kerr, Andrea Spalding, Patricia Robertson, Anne Simpson and Alison Wearing.

==== Justices-in-Residence ====
Initiated in 2001, the Justice-in-Residence program brings Justices to the college, where they participate in college life and make formal and informal presentations. Some of the past Justices-in-Residence: The Honourable Mr. Justice Charles Gonthier (2001), The Right Honourable Beverley McLachlin (Chief Justice of Canada) (2002), The Honourable Mr. Justice Frank Iacobucci (2003), The Honourable Mr. Justice W. Ian Binnie (2004), The Honourable Madam Justice Rosalie Silberman Abella (2006), The Honourable Mr. Justice Marshall Rothstein (2007), The Honourable Mr. Justice Robert Singley (2009).

=== Social and Community Activities ===
In addition to formal academic programming, a diverse array of resident committees are active at the college. Associations include: Wellness Committee, Sustainability Committee, Arts Committee, Garden Committee, Outreach Committee, Social Committee, Sports Committee, and French, Spanish and German conversation groups. The Residents' Council is a coordinating committee consisting of the committee chairs, the President of the Green College Dining Society, and one Resident Member from each of the College Standing Committees (Academic, Membership, Media and Communications) chosen by the resident caucuses of those committees.

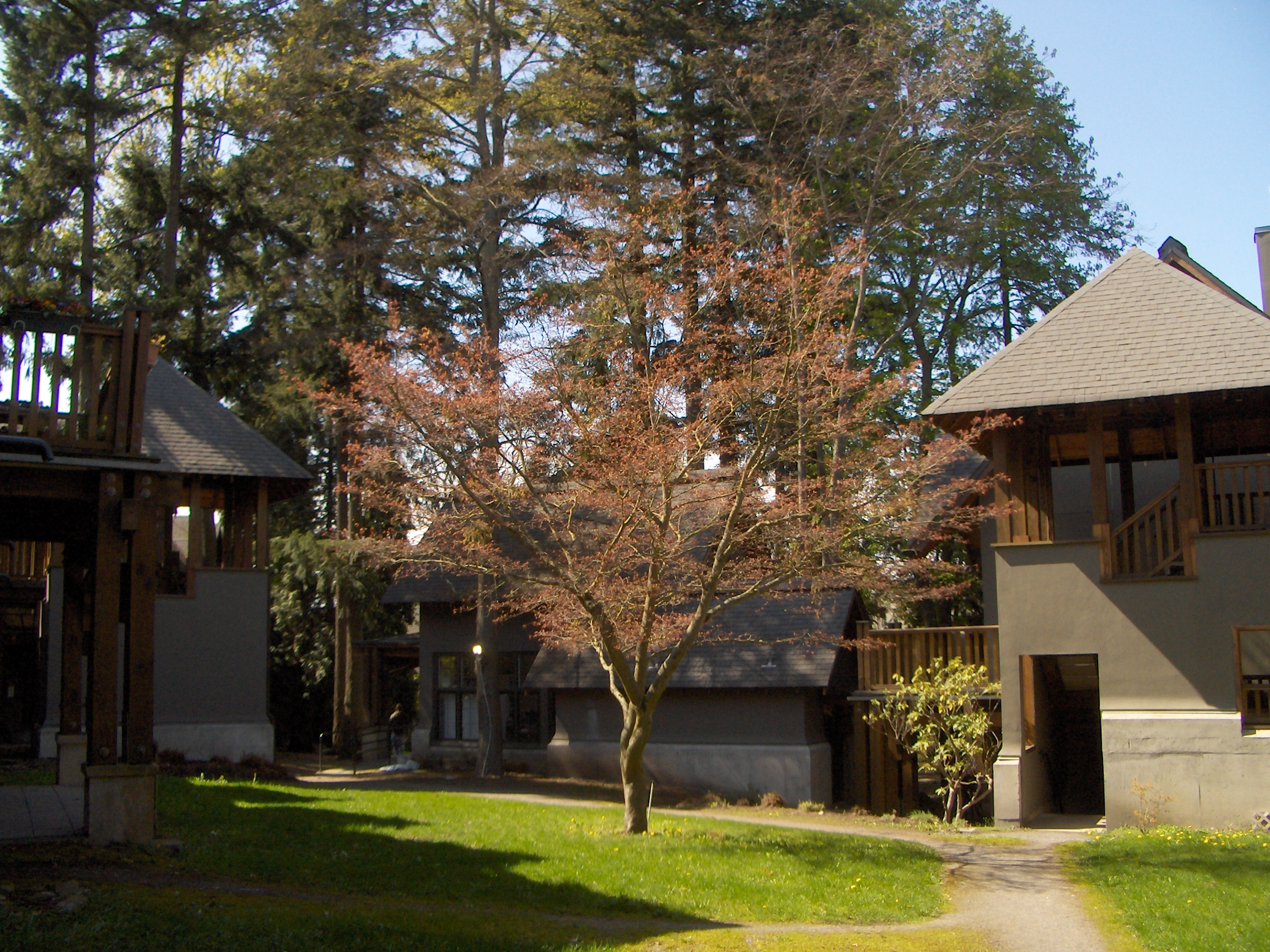
Residence courtyard, showing Common Kitchen building.

== Location and Facilities ==
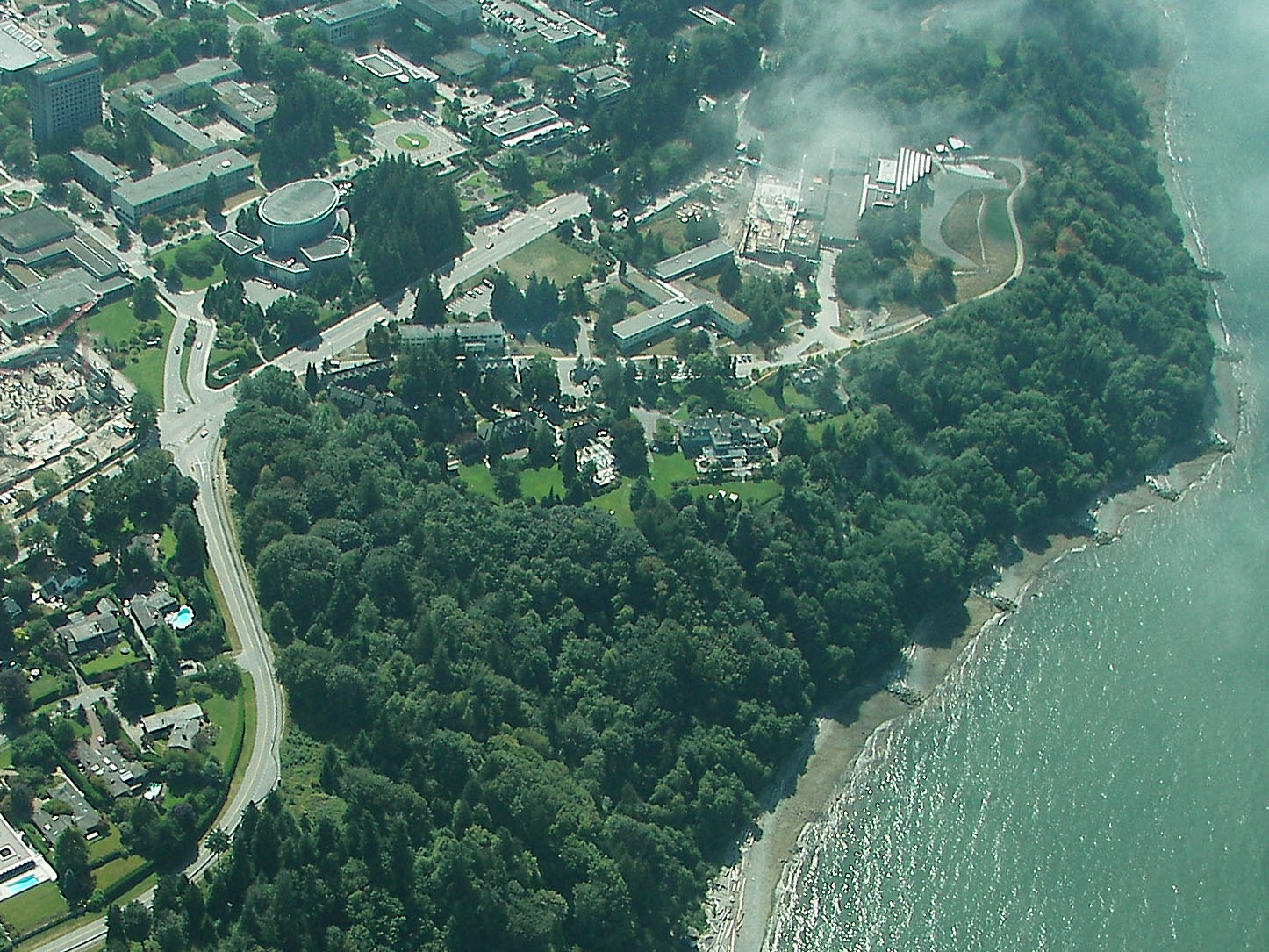
Green College and its surroundings on UBC campus

Green College is located on the University of British Columbia's main campus on the northern side of the peninsula, dangling precariously above Tower Beach and Wreck Beach. Located on Cecil Green Park Road, just off of North West Marine Drive, the college is adjacent to Cecil Green Park House, the Departments of Anthropology and Sociology, the Chan Shun Concert Hall and the Museum of Anthropology at UBC. Green College is situated on the UBC Vancouver campus, slightly west of the city of Vancouver.

Green College consists of two heritage buildings: the Coach House and Graham House, the latter designed by Maclure and Fox in 1915, a series of residential blocks, guest house accommodations, Green Commons, a shared kitchen complex, gardens and a patio. The original garden design was by Thomas h. Mawson. The architectural style reflects the college's west coast location and is integrated with the forested oceanside landscape.

The Coach House is home to a number of lecture series and conferences, while Graham House is the site of resident meals, galas and special events. Both buildings are also available for rental with catering providing by the Green College Dining Society. As of August 2007, Green Commons is home to the university's Interdisciplinary Graduate Programme.

== Organization ==
The college is a unit of the Faculty of Graduate + Post-doctoral Studies (G+PS) of UBC. The head of the college is the College Principal who reports to the Dean of G+PS. Management of the college is guided through an advisory board consisting of faculty, community leaders, college residents and representatives from parallel institutions. Academic components of the college are managed through a variety of joint faculty – resident committees.

The Green College Dining Society is an independent entity that oversees the provision of meals to members of Green College and guests, serving daily meals to residents as well as providing catering services for events held at the college. The GCDS is governed by a board of directors with Executive Officers elected annually by members of the Society.
