= List of universities in Saint Pierre and Miquelon =

This is a list of universities in Saint Pierre and Miquelon.

== Universities ==
=== Former ===
- The Institut Frecker was affiliated with the Memorial University of Newfoundland and was located at the FrancoForum but ended in 2026 due to an insufficient number of host families in Saint Pierre and Miquelon.

== See also ==
- List of universities by country
