= Gushue =

Gushue is a surname. Notable people with the surname include:

- Brad Gushue (born 1980), Canadian curler
- George W. Gushue (1854–1941), Newfoundland politician
- Joe Gushue (1915–1996), American referee
- Raymond Gushue (1900–1980), Canadian lawyer and academic administrator from Newfoundland
- Taylor Gushue (born 1993), American baseball player
