= John Lewis Paton =

British academic

- Born: 1863
- Died: 1946 (aged 82–83)
- Education: St. John's College, Cambridge
- Occupation: academic
- Scientific career
- Workplaces: Manchester Grammar School

John Lewis Paton (1863 - 1946) was a British missionary and academic who served as an educationist and high school headmaster.

== Biography ==
He was born on 13 August 1863 in Sheffield, England. He was the son of John Brown Paton, a Scottish missionary.

He died in 1946.

== Education ==
He was educated in Halle, Germany, at Nottingham High School and at Shrewsbury School where he became head boy.

He entered St John's College, Cambridge, in 1886 where he placed first in Classical Tripos, part two, with special distinction in Language and History. He also received the Junior Chancellor's Medal for Classics.

== Career ==
He was the High Master of Manchester Grammar School from 1902 to 1924.

He was President of Memorial University College from 1925 to 1933.

== Legacy ==
Today he is honoured in a number of ways. For example, the Paton College is named after him. Additionally, The John Lewis Paton Distinguished University Professorship is named after him.

== See also ==
- The Dictionary of Modern American Philosophers
