= Paton College =

- College of Memorial University of Newfoundland
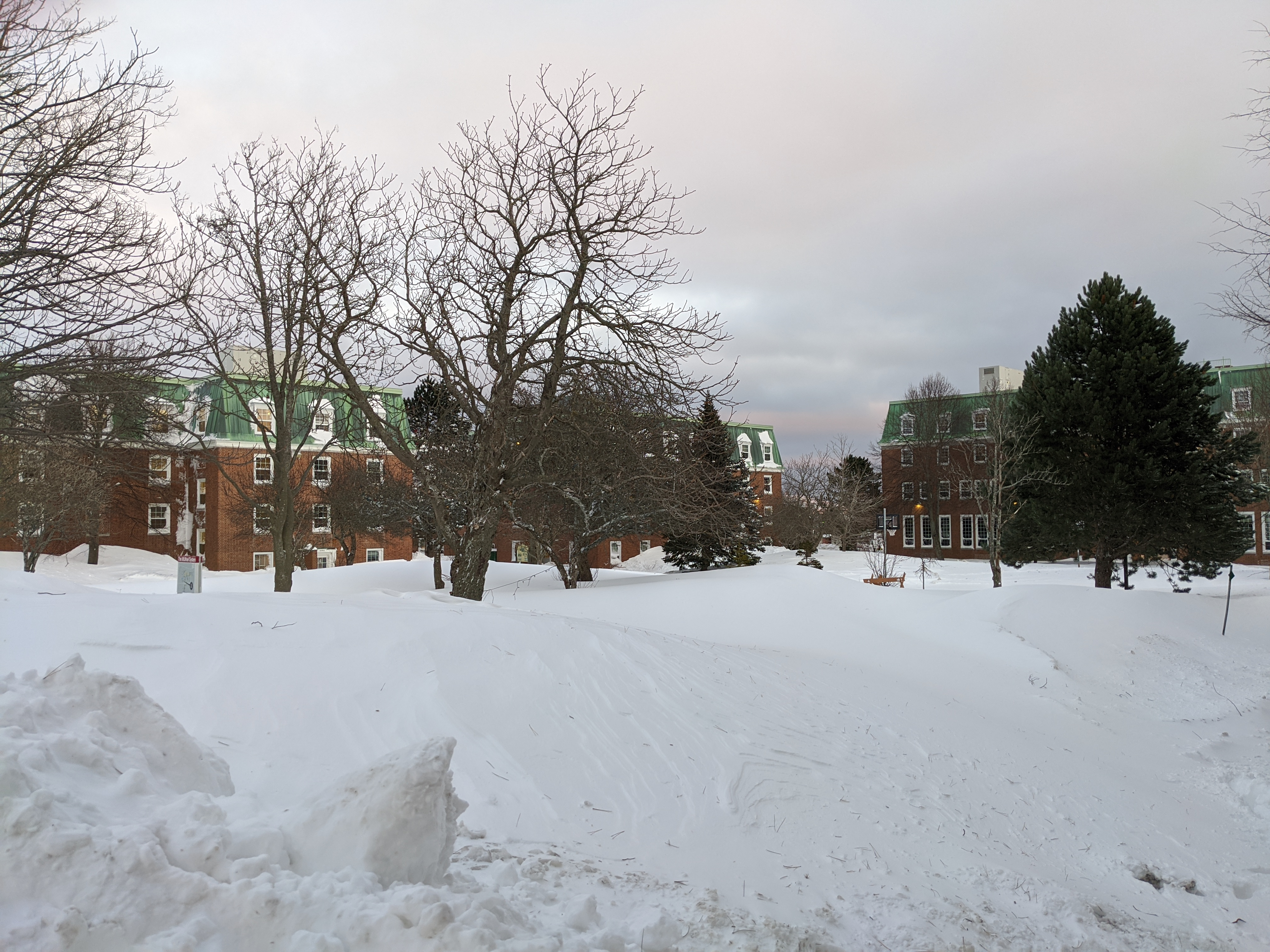
- Paton College, January 2020
- Established: 1960
- Named after: John Lewis Paton
- Architectural style: Collegiate Georgian
- Website: www.mun.ca/residences/

Paton College are residences operated by Memorial University of Newfoundland located on the eastern end of the St. John's campus. Paton College offers traditional dormitory style housing while Burton's Pond is apartment style housing. Paton College provides accommodations for students who are attending either Memorial University, the Marine Institute, or the College of the North Atlantic (Prince Philip Drive Campus).

== History ==
Construction of Paton College began in 1962, with most of the nine residences being completed by 1968. The college is named after John Lewis Paton, who was the first President of Memorial University College from 1926 to 1933. The nine original Houses of Paton College were named in honour of various benefactors of Memorial University College and Memorial University, including Lord Rothermere and Sir Eric Bowater. Coughlan College, a single dormitory building originally operated as one of four denominational residences, became a part of Paton College in the mid-1990s. A modified Paton family coat of arms was bestowed upon the college and serves as its official heraldic achievement to this day.

== Paton College residences ==
The ten Paton College residence halls are referred to as the "Houses". They include:

- Barnes House
- Blackall House
- Bowater House
- Burke House
- Coughlan House
- Curtis House
- Doyle House
- Hatcher House
- Rothermere House
- Squires House

Each residence accommodates approximately 100 students. Prior to 1992, all the Paton College residences were single sex. In 2005, the sole remaining male house (Doyle) was turned co-ed. In 2008, Squires House converted from an all-female house to co-ed. This left Blackall House the only remaining all-female house until January 2010, when it finished its renovations and was converted into a co-ed house.

Each residence hall consists of both double and single occupancy bedrooms, and shared bathroom facilities on each floor, which are gender-neutral on the second floor only at present. First years must share a double room (unless handicapped, in which case they can request a single room from the Glenn Roy Blundon Centre), single rooms are available to seniors depending on credits and GPA. Each residence has a TV room, laundry room, study room, computer room, lobby, and a trunk room for storage. Meals are provided at the main dining hall; the Raymond Gushue Hall.

All residents of Paton College must purchase a meal plan. Students can choose from a 100 meal per semester plan, 14-per week, 19-per week or unlimited meal plan.

== Residence Life ==
The Residence Life Office at Memorial University is a unit within the department of Student Residences. As part of the university's division of Student Affairs and Services, the Residence Life Office provides guidance, support, and programming to assist students in their transition from life at home to life at school and their personal and social development. The Residence Life Office at Memorial is staffed by a number of full-time professionals, including the Residence Life Manager, the Residence Life Supervisor, and three Residence Life Advisors, who live on campus.

Residence Life professionals supervise a large team of part-time and student residence life staff. Each residence has one Residence Coordinator, who is the university's part-time, live-in supervisor for their residence. The RC is responsible for identifying and addressing resident needs and issues, and for supervising the student staff (RAs), as well as performing various administrative duties such as room assignments and discipline. Resident concerns or issues that cannot be addressed by the student staff are referred to the Residence Coordinator.

Each of the Paton College dormitories also has four RAs, or Resident Assistants, who live on each floor of the House. The RAs are responsible for addressing the needs and concerns of the residents and for ensuring that the residents abide by the rules and regulations.

== Residence Society Executive ==
Each residence at Memorial University of Newfoundland is recognized as a student society by the university administration and undergraduate students' union (MUNSU). At the end of each winter semester, the residents elected a residence society executive for the following academic year (September - April). The residence society executive consists of a president, vice-president, treasurer, and social chair. The executive promote residence spirit by organizing various residence events and leading their residence in campus competitions, including the Fall Orientation, Intramural sports, and Winter Carnival. The residence society executive are also the representatives of their society when meeting with the university administration and the students' union.
