= Bonne Bay Marine Station =

Research facility in Newfoundland, Canada

Coordinates: 49.517501°N 57.876536°W

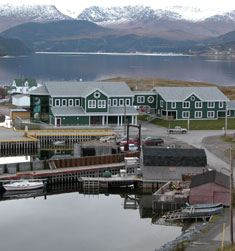
Bonne Bay Marine Station

Bonne Bay Marine Station is a marine ecology research and teaching facility on Bonne Bay along Newfoundland's west coast. It offers services to students, researchers, educators and the general public. The station is within Gros Morne National Park, a recognized UNESCO World Heritage Site. The aquarium portion of the facility is open to visitors. Interactive aquariums tours are provided to walk-ins, as well as school and community groups. The tour offers exhibits the latest research while showcasing marine flora and fauna in the station's aquaria and touch tank. Officially opened on 6 September, 2002, the Bonne Bay Marine Station is operated by Memorial University of Newfoundland and the Gros Morne Co-operating Association. Funding was provided by Atlantic Canada Opportunities Agency (ACOA) and the Newfoundland and Labrador Provincial Government.

== Mandate ==
- To provide an infrastructure and environment that is supportive of first-class teaching and research in marine science.
- To support significant activities in public education and regional economic development via its interpretive components, gift area and other programs operated in its facilities.

== Facility ==
- Modern teaching and research laboratories
- Library and computer resource center
- Accommodations wing (up to 31 people)
- Kitchen/Dining Area
- Fully equipped 60 seat theatre
- Full range of physical and biological oceanographic equipment, including:
  - Several small boats
  - Scuba Equipment
  - Plankton nets
  - Niskin bottles
  - Bottom grabs
  - Beach seine
  - CTD
  - Submarine digital Amphibico/Sony video system
  - Assorted collecting pots and nets
  - Salinity/Temperature meters
- Flow through seawater aquaria for public displays
- Flow through seawater aquaria for research
- Public aquarium displays
- Marine touch tank
- Gift area

== Research ==
The Bonne Bay Marine Station provides oceanographers, biologists and other scientists with a facility for marine ecosystem research. The Bonne Bay area accesses biodiversity in icy fjords basins, salmon estuaries, Arctic kelp beds, salt marshes and the open Gulf of St. Lawrence. Resident populations of offshore animals and Arctic species are easily accessible.

=== Current projects ===
The Bonne Bay Marine Station promotes multi-disciplinary research collaboration between scientists, industry, government agencies and community organizations. Areas of interest include oceanography, marine ecology/biology and aquaculture. Ongoing research includes:

- Kelp and Sea Urchin aquaculture
  - Native species are cultured and evaluated for aquaculture potential; techniques are devised and tested
- Ecology of snow crab and lobster
- Fisheries & Coastal Community
- Benthic and planktonic sampling
- Habitat sensitivity; environmental assessment
- Species at risk research (Wolffish species, Acadian Redfish etc.)
- Atlantic Cod Research
- Biodiversity of seaweeds and invertebrates

The Station's facilities and support services are available to researchers who wish to undertake research.

== Education ==
=== Semester by the Sea ===
Five undergraduate field courses in Marine Biology are offered at the Bonne Bay Marine Station during the spring/summer semester, with additional courses available in the fall/winter semesters. Additionally, two graduate field courses are offered, and arrangements are often made for other graduate courses at Bonne Bay.

=== Undergraduate ===
General courses include: Biology 3709 - Marine Principles and Techniques, Biology 3714 - Estuarine Fish Ecology, Biology 4014 - Biology of Boreal and Arctic Seaweeds, Biology 4710 - Experimental Marine Ecology of Newfoundland Waters, Biology 4912 - Marine Mammals.

Fall/Winter Courses include: Biology 3709 - Marine Principles and Techniques, Biology 4810 - Marine Research Field Course.

=== Graduate ===
Biology 7535 - Research Methods in Marine Science Techniques

Biology 6110 - Advanced Phycology

== Public programing ==
Through a public education program, visitors, school groups, and community groups may observe marine flora and fauna in the stations aquaria, and learn about the latest research. Guided tours are provided by Marine Education Interpreters, Discovery Tours of Bonne Bay are offered in partnership with the local boat tour operators, and Sea Kayaking for Nature Lovers tour with Marine Education Interpreters are available throughout the summer season.

== History ==
30 years ago the Bonne Bay Marine Station was a small field station of Memorial University. The original station was a 2-storey house. The top floor had a small kitchen, a living room and three small bedrooms. The main floor had two larger rooms that were converted into labs and a small bathroom that was converted into a chemical lab where radioactive work and the chemical work was performed. It had a full basement, and there was an old fish store as a second building.

Dr. Bob Hooper first visited the Bonne Bay area then and was taken with its breathtaking beauty, amazing marine biodiversity, and potential as a prime location for teaching and research. He helped convert this outport house with a fishing store into a marine teaching and research facility.

Summer teaching activities began in 1979 with a single two week program. By 2001 seven, two week academic programs were running from mid April to September. The student demand for courses, and high level of research interest, often exceeded the available space. In addition, local visitors and summer tourists were frequently "dropping in" to view the aquarium, and learn about the latest research ventures. The existing station could no longer accommodate the needs for the facility. A new teaching and research facility plan was developed.

The official opening of the new Bonne Bay Marine Station occurred September 6, 2002. Built on the site of the old station this $3.2 million facility was funded by the Atlantic Canada Opportunities Agency; the Gros Morne Co-operating Association; the Department of Industry, Trade and Rural Development, Government of Newfoundland and Labrador; and Memorial University.

== CURRA ==
The Community-University Research for Recovery Alliance (CURRA) is a 5-year research program centered at Bonne Bay Marine Station. This program of innovative, interdisciplinary research projects is helping communities and organizations along Newfoundland's west coast develop strategies for the recovery of fish stocks and fishery communities.

The CURRA brings together researchers from the social and natural sciences and fine arts at Memorial University in St. John's and Sir Wilfred Grenfell College in Corner Brook in working partnerships with numerous stakeholders and community organizations.

The long-term objectives of the CURRA include promoting community engagement with the Station, promoting and diversifying the research community affiliated with the Station and training researchers in collaborative, community-based research approaches.
