= Moses Morgan =

Canadian academic

Moses Osbourne Morgan

President of Memorial University of Newfoundland
- In office 1973–1981
- Preceded by: The Lord Taylor of Harlow
- Succeeded by: Leslie Harris

Personal details
- Born: August 28, 1917 Blaketown, Newfoundland
- Died: April 24, 1995 (aged 77) St. John's, Newfoundland, Canada

Moses Osbourne Morgan, CC (August 28, 1917 – April 24, 1995) was a Canadian academic and president of Memorial University of Newfoundland from 1973 to 1981.

Born in Blaketown, Trinity Bay, Newfoundland, Morgan was educated at Bishop Feild College and Memorial University College. Then he received a bachelor's degree from Dalhousie University and was elected a Rhodes Scholar for 1938. He did not attend the University of Oxford until after the Second World War. From 1940 to 1942, he taught at King's College School in Windsor, Nova Scotia. In 1942, he enlisted in the Canadian Army and saw service in Europe as a platoon commander. He completed a master's degree in Classics at Dalhousie before taking up his Rhodes Scholarship. Returning from his studies at Oxford, he taught at Dalhousie from 1948 until 1950 when he joined Memorial University of Newfoundland, initially as a professor of Political science. He was president, pro tem from 1966 until 1967 and was appointed president in 1973.

In 1973, he was made a Companion of the Order of Canada. He was awarded honorary doctoral degrees by Mount Allison University, Dalhousie University, University of King's College, St. Francis Xavier University, University of New Brunswick, Queen's University, the University of Toronto and Memorial University of Newfoundland.

Academic offices
| Preceded by Raymond Gushue | President of Memorial University of Newfoundland; 1966–1967 pro tempore | Succeeded by The Lord Taylor of Harlow |
| Preceded by The Lord Taylor of Harlow | President of Memorial University of Newfoundland; 1973–1981 | Succeeded by Leslie Harris |
