= Tierney Hall, Fordham University =

Coordinates: 40°51′33″N 73°53′0″W

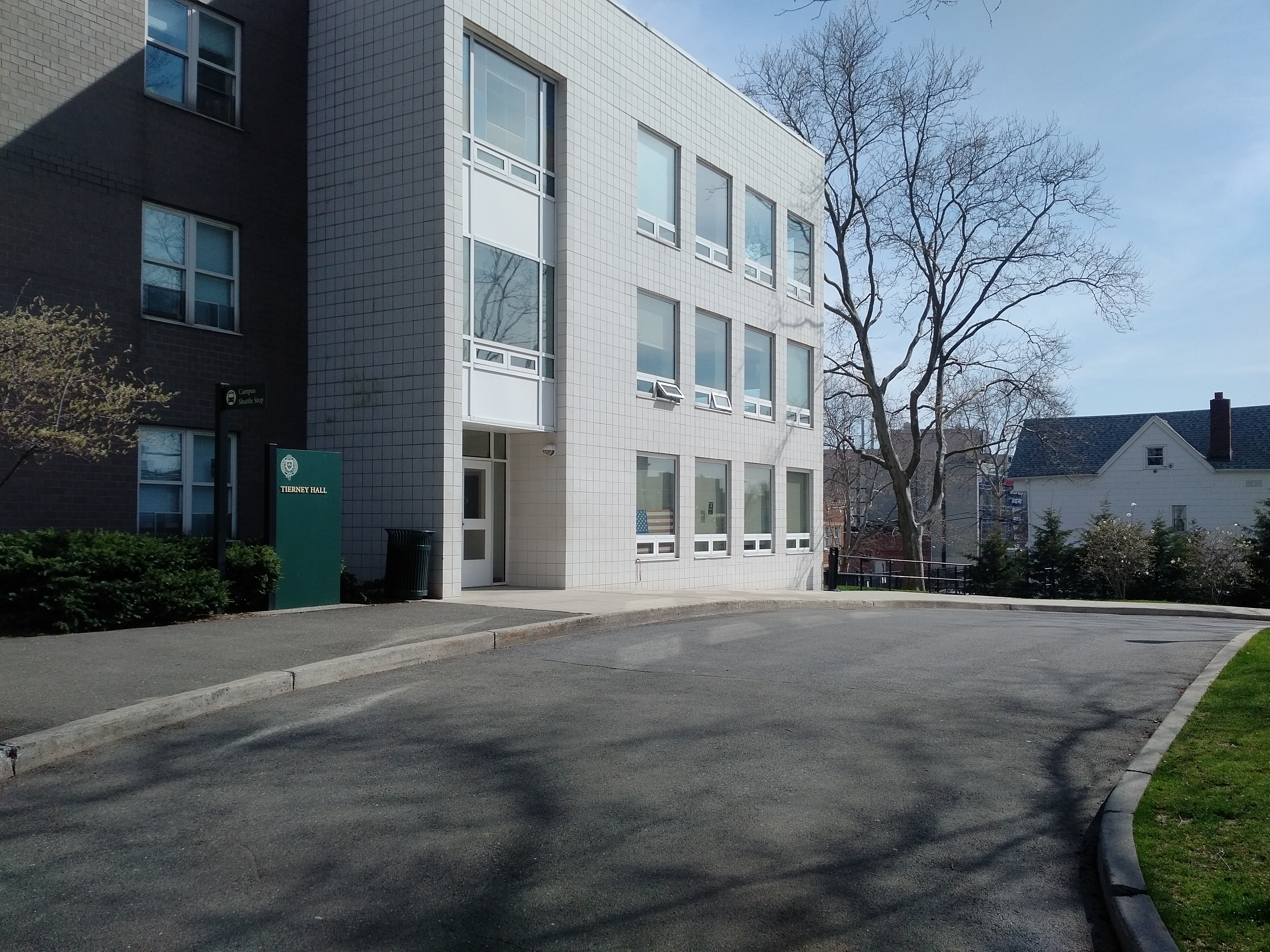
Tierney Hall

Tierney Hall is one of the three residential colleges on the Rose Hill campus of Fordham University, in the Bronx, NY. It is home to about 150 students each semester. Tierney is described by the school as a "warm environment of a close-knit community." Tierney Hall was renovated in the summer of 2007.
