= Marine Institute of Memorial University of Newfoundland =

Coordinates: 47°35′11.19″N 52°44′10.04″W

The Fisheries and Marine Institute of Memorial University of Newfoundland
- University logo
- Motto: Ad Excellentiam Nitere (Latin)
- Motto in English: "Strive for Excellence"
- Type: Public
- Established: 1964
- Affiliations: CICan
- Director: Paul Brett
- Location: St. John's, Newfoundland and Labrador, Canada
- Campus: Urban 220 acres (89 ha)
- Colours: blue & teal
- Website: www.mi.mun.ca

The Fisheries and Marine Institute of Memorial University of Newfoundland, popularly referred to as the Marine Institute (MI) or simply Marine, is a post-secondary ocean and marine polytechnic located in St. John's, Newfoundland and Labrador, Canada. It is affiliated with Memorial University of Newfoundland.

The Marine Institute contains unique facilities such as two full ships bridge simulators and the world's largest flume tank. It offers degrees, diplomas, certifications and industry training for the maritime sector.

== History ==
In 1964, Newfoundland Premier Joey Smallwood opened the College of Fisheries, Navigation, Marine Engineering and Electronics, at the former Parade St. campus of Memorial University College (now Memorial University of Newfoundland). The Fisheries College, as it was then known colloquially, was moved in 1985 to its current Ridge Road building and renamed to the Institute of Fisheries and Marine Technology.

1992 saw the name change again, as the institution became affiliated with Memorial University as The Fisheries and Marine Institute of Memorial University of Newfoundland.

== Campus ==
Marine's main campus is located on Ridge Road, overlooking the city of St. John's. Satellite facilities include the Offshore Safety and Survival Centre (OSSC) training centre in Foxtrap, the Safety and Emergency Response Training Centre (SERT) in Stephenville, harbour-side facilities at pier 25 in St. John's and Holyrood, and ships of up to 130 feet (40 m) in length.

== Academia ==
Marine is academically organized into three primary structures: the School of Fisheries, the School of Maritime Studies, and the School of Ocean Technology

=== School of Fisheries ===
The School of Fisheries focuses on the use, sustainability and management of aquatic resources and the marine environment; primarily, aquaculture, harvesting, food processing and safety. It encompasses the Centre for Sustainable Aquatic Resources (CSAR) and the Centre for Aquaculture and Seafood Development (CASD).

=== School of Maritime Studies ===
The School of Maritime Studies focuses on the marine transport industry and its related fields; primarily, ship operations and vessel design. It encompasses the Offshore Safety and Survival Centre (OSSC) and the Centre for Marine Simulation (CMS).

=== School of Ocean Technology ===
The School of Ocean Technology was established in May 2007 with a $1 million investment from the government of Newfoundland and Labrador. The school focuses on technologies that enable safe, efficient, and effective activity in ocean industries. This includes ocean instrumentation and equipment, marine information and communication technologies, ocean mapping and underwater technology. The school will also provide education and training as well as industrial outreach for the Ocean Technology sector.

== See also ==
- Memorial University of Newfoundland
- Webb Institute
- Higher education in Newfoundland and Labrador
- Canadian university scientific research organizations
