= John Brown Paton =

Scottish Congregationalist minister, college head and author (1830–1911)

John Brown Paton (1830–1911) was a Scottish Congregationalist minister, college head and author.

== Early life ==
Born 17 December 1830 at Galston, East Ayrshire, Paton was the son of Alexander Paton by his wife Mary, daughter of Andrew Brown of Newmilns, both of the United Secession Church; he claimed descent from Covenanters, on his father's side from John Paton (d. 1684), on his mother's from John Brown (1627?–1685). His father ultimately joined the Congregationalists.

From Loudoun parish school, Paton went on in 1838 to the tuition of his maternal uncle Andrew Morton Brown, D.D., Congregational minister, then at Poole, Dorset. In 1844 Paton was at Kilmarnock, where he met Alexander Russel, and came into the orbit of James Morison. Returning in 1844 to his uncle, now at Cheltenham, Paton encountered a decisive influence in Henry Rogers.

Deciding to become a congregational minister, Paton entered in January 1847 Spring Hill College, Birmingham, in which Rogers held the chair of literature and philosophy. With his fellow-student, Robert William Dale, he formed a lifelong friendship. He heard Ralph Waldo Emerson lecture on the Conduct of Life in the Birmingham town hall, and attended (from 1850) the ministry of Robert Alfred Vaughan, another important influence. During his college course he graduated B.A. at London University in 1849; gained the Hebrew and New Testament prize there (1850), and a divinity scholarship (1852) on the foundation of Dr Williams, and proceeded M.A. London in 1854, both in classics and in philosophy (with gold medal).

== Principal ==
Leaving college in June 1854, Paton took charge of a mission in Wicker, a parish in the northern part of Sheffield, where the Wicker congregational church was built in 1855. In addition, the congregation in Garden Street chapel, Sheffield, was revived.

In 1861 Cavendish College, Manchester was started for the training of candidates for the congregational ministry; Paton went weekly from Sheffield to take part in its teaching. In 1863 the institution was transferred to Nottingham as the Congregational Institute, with Paton as its first principal. Temporary premises were exchanged for a permanent building (1868), and the institute grew in reputation during the 35 years of Paton's headship. In 1882 he was made D.D. of Glasgow University.

In 1898 Paton was succeeded by James Alexander Mitchell (1849–1905), who from 1903 until his death was general secretary of the Congregational Union.

== Interests ==
In line with the ideas of the Inner Mission, founded in 1848 by Johann Hinrich Wichern of Hamburg, Paton took part in plans for the improvement of social conditions, e.g. home colonisation with small land-holders, the co-operative banks movement, the social purity crusade. With Canon Morse, vicar of St. Mary's, Nottingham, he promoted a series of university lectures which led the way to the establishment of Nottingham University College in 1880. It was at Paton's suggestion that Christopher Wordsworth, the bishop of Lincoln, sent a letter of sympathy in 1872 to the Old Catholics.

Among societies of which Paton was a founder were:

- The National Home Reading Union (1889), suggested by the account given by Joshua Girling Fitch of "The Chautauqua Reading Circle" in the Nineteenth Century, October 1888.
- The Bible Reading and Prayer Union (1892).
- The English Land Colonisation Society, 1892 (later the Co-operative Small Holders Association).
- The Boys' (1900) and Girls' (1903) Life Brigades.
- The Young Men's and Young Women's Brigade of Service (1905). The British Institute of Social Service was set up the same year by Paton with Shaftesbury Lectures, and ran the Shaftesbury Lectures.
- The Boys' and Girls' League of Honour (1906).

Paton was president of the Licensing Laws Information Bureau (1898–1902), and vice-president of the British Institute for Social Service (1904), and of the British and Foreign Bible Society (1907).

Paton with Robert William Dale edited (1858–61) The Eclectic Review. With Frederick Smeeton Williams, his colleague, he edited the "Home Mission Tract Series" (1865). He was a consulting editor (1882–8) of the Contemporary Review, to which, at his request, Lightfoot contributed (1874–7) his articles on Supernatural Religion. With Percy William Bunting, and Alfred Ernest Garvie, he edited a series of papers Christ and Civilisation (1910), his last work.

== Works ==
Paton's publications include The Two-fold Alternative (3rd edition, 1900), The Inner Mission of the Church (new ed., 1900), and two volumes of collected essays. He was a constant contributor to literary reviews.

== Family ==
His son, John Lewis Paton (1863–1946), who headed the Cambridge classical tripos in 1886, became High Master of Manchester Grammar School in 1903.
