= Higher education in Newfoundland and Labrador =

Memorial University of Newfoundland
- Motto: Provehito In Altum
- Type: Public university
- Established: 1925
- Endowment: $103 million
- President: Dr. Vianne Timmons
- Academic staff: 1,074
- Administrative staff: 1,532
- Undergraduates: 14,208
- Postgraduates: 3,565
- Doctoral students: 234
- Location: St. John's, Corner Brook, NL, Canada
- Campus: 4 urban/suburban
- Website: https://www.mun.ca
- University Coat of Arms

Province of Newfoundland and Labrador

College of the North Atlantic
- Motto: We're so much more.
- Type: Public college
- Established: 1997
- President: Elizabeth (Liz) Kidd
- Academic staff: 675
- Administrative staff: 576
- Students: 7,881 full-time, 1,726 part-time, 14,158 continuing education
- Location: Stephenville, Newfoundland, Newfoundland and Labrador, Canada
- Campus: 17 urban/suburban
- Website: www.cna.nl.ca

Newfoundland and Labrador has had the same growing pains as other provinces in developing its own form of education and now boasts a very strong, although relatively small, system. The direction of Newfoundland and Labrador's policy has evolved rapidly since the late 1990s, with increased funding, participation rates, accessibility and transferability. Many of the directives the government has been acting upon in the past 10 years have been a result of recommendations that stemmed from a 2005 white paper: Foundation for Success: White Paper on Public Post-Secondary Education. It set the course for furthering the strategic directives of the provincial post-secondary education sector. Some of its recommendations aimed to:

- strengthen the base of the post-secondary education system
- improve the capacity of the university and college
- provide greater support services to students
- maintain adequate and stable funding for the students and the institutions
- improve accountability and collaboration within and between the post-secondary institutions

== Timeline of higher education in the province ==
- 1823: Newfoundland School Society is founded to train teachers for the out-port communities
- 1893: Council of Higher Education (CHE) is formed to help grade 11 students matriculate to universities in Canada, the United States and the United Kingdom
- 1911: Rhodes Scholarship Committee informs CHE of dissatisfaction with the performance of Newfoundlanders at Oxford
- 1925: Memorial University College is founded as a living memorial to those who died in active service during World War I
- 1933: Memorial University College and the Normal School are merged
- 1949: Memorial University College becomes Memorial University, a full degree granting institution, with the passing of the University Act of 1949
- 1963: District Vocational Schools open around the province
- 1967: Adult Upgrading Centre opens in Stephenville
- 1977: Bay St. George Community college is established from existing vocational school, Adult Upgrading Centre and Heavy Equipment School
- 1987: Two institutes and five community colleges are formed
- 1992: Five Colleges of Arts and Technology and Continuing Education are formed from the two institutes and five community colleges
- 1997: College of the North Atlantic is created from five colleges; it becomes the single community college in the province
- 2005: "Foundation for Success: White Paper on Public Post-Secondary Education" is published

== History ==
=== Early policy ===
In the early 19th century, most schools in Newfoundland were one room school houses. The first Education Act in Newfoundland in 1836 inaugurated the existing elementary schools in its public education system, most of which had remained non-denominational. This was the first direct government involvement with education.

Despite this seemingly secular policy, anti-Catholic sentiment at the time resulted in hostility to Newfoundland's Roman Catholic population (which numbered half the colony) and to Catholic schools. This led to the Protestant-backed Education Act of 1843, which saw Catholics share education grants equally with Protestants. The Protestant grant was further divided between the Church of England and the Methodists and in the Education Act of 1876, the government transferred all its responsibility on education to the churches, thus setting up a denominational system of education. From this point on, religion, as well as the largest economic sector, fisheries, would be the driving factors behind Newfoundland's education system.

The next decades saw much infighting among many of Newfoundlanders around the allocation of grant money. Government revenue was based mainly on customs dues, so grant money would grow or shrink depending on the state of the economy. This resulted in schools which were smaller than needed and lacked sufficient equipment, and teachers who were both under-educated and underpaid. The Education Act of 1876 set up Superintendents for each of the denominational schools: Catholic, Church of England, and Methodist, which made up 90 percent of the population. The situation only worsened as money was spent on building new schools rather than increasing teacher salaries, which continued to fall.

=== The roots of higher education ===
The colony began to turn its attention to higher education. In 1893 the Council of Higher Education (CHE) was formed and it crossed all denominations. The main purpose of the council was to test students from grades 6 through 11, who were deemed to have an academic disadvantage when trying to enter universities outside the colony. CHE established a set curriculum and guidelines for instruction. While CHE also encouraged students to enter university, there were no higher education institutions in Newfoundland. Thus, CHE formed many agreements with institutions in other provinces and countries to recognize CHE exams, which followed existing, accepted British exams, as prerequisites. Unfortunately, universities, especially Oxford, which was accepting Rhodes Scholars, were dissatisfied with the results of Newfoundlanders. Unlike students from Newfoundland, students from other Canadian provinces had already completed two years of higher education, and as a result, CHE began planning to set up an institution in St. John's which could provide the first two years of university to students.

By 1920, a full Department of Education was set up in Newfoundland (now a self-governing Dominion) and by 1925, Memorial University College (MUC) was founded. MUC offered two-year programs, continued to build relationships with universities elsewhere, and prepared Newfoundlanders for degree completion. Despite its links to British system (examinations were sent to the University of London for grading), MUC decided to use the course arrays and requirements of the Maritime universities, which therefore tied it to the Canadian Higher Education System. In 1933, MUC merged with the Normal School and assumed the teacher training program.

=== The road to confederation ===
While MUC received funding from the Carnegie Corporation of New York, it had to weather the Great Depression and the budget roller coaster that came with it. From 1934, after a stint of independence from Britain, Newfoundland increased expenditure in education to revitalize the system and improve conditions. Recovery was made, but by 1949, when the Dominion became a Province, it was in much the same condition as 25 years before. Facilities were still outdated and the terms of Confederation ensured that schools would remain run by denominational Boards of Education. On a positive note, the National Convention (1946–1948) endorsed the idea to build a degree granting institution in Newfoundland. As a result, MUC became the Memorial University of Newfoundland (MUN) in 1949, and new money from the federal government began to arrive after 1957 in the form of equalization payments. The Newton Report (1952) and the Harris Report (1967) recommended limited government involvement over MUN and thus allowed it a certain level of autonomy.

=== Late 20th century changes ===
The concepts of vocational schools and community colleges emerged in the 1960s. The College of Fisheries, Navigation, Marine Engineering and Electronics opened in 1964 to teach fishery-related subjects. The Warren Commission in 1968 secularized the Department of Education and this marked the beginning of great changes in the education system.

Changes made in the 1970s and 1980s include the establishment of MUN's Regional College at Corner Brook (later renamed Sir Wilfred Grenfell College) and the introduction of grade 12. In 1987, two institutes (Cabot Institute and Fisher Technical College) and five community colleges (Avalon Community College, Eastern Community College, Central Newfoundland Community College, Labrador Community College and Western Community College) were formed.

In 1992, the College of Fisheries, Navigation, Marine Engineering and Electronics became the Marine Institute of MUN and in 1997 the Community Colleges amalgamated into the College of the North Atlantic.

== Structure ==
Each province in Canada is responsible for its higher education. Newfoundland and Labrador has a small but effective system of higher education institutions. Its system is also unique in Canada as it is the only system with one university and one college. Memorial University of Newfoundland (MUN) is categorized as a comprehensive, degree-granting university, and the College of the North Atlantic (CNA) provides diverse technical and career-oriented certificates, apprenticeship, degree and diploma programmes with university-level transfer courses. The Fisheries and Marine Institute (MI) is linked to MUN and provides fisheries and marine technology training. Several health-related programs are also offered through regional health authorities. There are also 25 provincially registered private training institutions.

=== Main laws/decrees governing higher education ===
- Memorial University Act (amended 1991) - Memorial University of Newfoundland
- College Act 1996 - College of the North Atlantic
- Private Training Institutions Act 1997 - private training institutions
- The Degree Granting Act 1998 - Memorial University of Newfoundland
- Apprenticeship and Certification Act 1999 - apprenticeship programs of the skilled trades

=== Memorial University of Newfoundland ===
Established in 1925 as a two-year university preparation school and a living memorial to the Newfoundlanders who died in active service during World War I, Memorial University of Newfoundland (MUN) was granted full degree-granting status in 1949 and now has approximately 18,000 students, 1000 faculty members and 1,500 support staff. Approximately 9% of its student body are international students, and 18% from other Canadian provinces, such as Nova Scotia. With four campuses across the province, it is the largest institution in the area. More than 100 undergraduate and graduate degrees are offered throughout six faculties (arts, business, education, medicine, engineering and applied science, science), five schools (music, human kinetics and recreation, nursing, pharmacy, social work) and one institute (Marine Institute).

The government deals directly with the university on budgetary and policy matters; however, the Board of Regents has a wide latitude in most operational areas and is responsible for the management, administration, and control of the property, revenue, business and affairs of the university.

=== College of the North Atlantic ===
In the mid-1990s, the provincial government closed four public college campuses. Shortly afterward, in 1997, the remaining 18 campuses were amalgamated to create the College of the North Atlantic, which provides diploma, certificate and degree programs throughout the province. Now on 17 campuses in the province and one campus in Qatar in the Middle East, the college offers applied degrees, as well as over 100 full-time certificate and diploma programs and 300 part-time courses in areas such as business, engineering technology, industrial education/trades, information communications technology, and tourism. The college's programs are developed in cooperation with industry to ensure graduates have the skills that are in demand in the job market, and are constantly updated to meet current industry standards. Government's role with respect to the college is to develop and enforce legislation; provide necessary resources, leadership, direction and support through the development of clear policies and priorities; and implement provincial strategies. The Board of Governors for the College of the North Atlantic is responsible for directing the affairs of the institutions, determining courses and programs and enacting bylaws for the conduct of business.

=== Private career colleges ===
The 25 privately operated career colleges in Newfoundland and Labrador provide career oriented education and training. Courses are reviewed internally, and approved by the Department of Education to ensure program quality and integrity. All programs are kept current with industry demands through meetings with industry personnel, and taught by instructors approved by the Department of Education. Over 175 programs are offered, that focus on helping students prepare for their chosen profession, which can range from flight training to welding to computer training to business administration. Programs are recognized and approved by the relevant regulating bodies, ensuring students receive a recognized diploma.

=== Associations ===
==== Council on Higher Education (CHE) ====
The Council on Higher Education (CHE), which was originally established in Newfoundland and Labrador in 1992, was recognized in legislation through the Council on Higher Education Act in 2006 as a result of a directive outlined in a 2005 White Paper on Public Post-Secondary Education. The CHE promotes collaboration in the public post-secondary education system by providing recommendations to Memorial University (MUN), the College of the North Atlantic (CNA) and the Minister of Education. The legislation enables the council to function as the mechanism for cooperation among its members in joint planning and coordination of common activities within the public education system. The legislation also requires the institutions to demonstrate greater connectedness with each other and strong accountability to the public. Furthermore, the legislation facilitates the institutions in establishing new operational alignments in support of an integrated approach where all parts of the education system work closely together. The Articulation, Transfer and Admissions Committee (ATAC) is mandated by Council to coordinate the articulation process at the College of the North Atlantic and Memorial University, optimize student accessibility and enhance student mobility through the transfer of credits.

==== Association of Atlantic Universities (AAU) ====
Established in 1964, the Association of Atlantic Universities is a voluntary association of the 17 universities in the Atlantic region and in the West Indies which offer programmes leading to a degree or have degree-granting status. One of the fundamental roles of the association is to create greater awareness and understanding of the important contribution of universities to the social and economic development of the Atlantic Provinces. The Association's business is conducted by the AAU Council, which consists of the executive heads of all the member institutions. The AAU currently meets two times a year and is served by a permanent secretariat. The activities of the Association are funded principally through annual membership fees based on the operating income of the member institutions.

==== Council of Atlantic Ministers of Education and Training (CAMET) ====
The Atlantic ministers responsible for education and training signed an agreement in April 2004 under which the provinces of New Brunswick, Newfoundland and Labrador, Nova Scotia, and Prince Edward Island agreed to collaborate on joint undertakings to respond to the needs identified in public and post-secondary education. CAMET is dedicated to further enhancing the level of cooperation in public and post-secondary education by working on common issues to improve learning for all Atlantic Canadians, optimize efficiencies and bring added value to provincial initiatives and priorities.

=== Department of Advanced Education and Skills ===
The role of the Department of Advanced Education and Skills of the provincial government is to support and oversee post-secondary education, to ensure the province has a skilled workforce and highly educated graduates to support the economy. It is composed of five branches:

- Community and Social Development
- Corporate Services
- Post-Secondary Education
- Regional Service Delivery
- Workforce Development and Immigration

== Funding ==
As with many Canadian public colleges and universities in the 1990s, those in Newfoundland experienced a huge drop in government funding and had to deal with budgeting challenges. Newfoundland's provincial revenues dropped significantly during this decade, falling 30% from 1992 through 1998 alone, equaling $3,500 per student. Since 1999, after years of funding cuts, program closures and skyrocketing tuition fees, access to and quality of post-secondary education have greatly improved in Newfoundland and Labrador. Freezing and reducing tuition fees, improving student financial aid, and increasing funding to the province's two post-secondary institutions have resulted in increased enrolment. Even in this environment, however, Memorial University and the College of the North Atlantic have turned increasingly to private funding in the form of corporate donations or short-term training contracts.

The Newfoundland and Labrador Government provided $3 million funding in 2006–07 to match, dollar-for-dollar, private sector contributions made to Memorial University and the College of the North Atlantic to support various infrastructure projects. In order to receive the funding, both institutions had to submit all eligible receipts to the Department of Education. This was year two of a three-year, $9 million initiative contained in the White Paper.

For Memorial University, government grants made up 81% of funding in 2009–10. This increased to 83% by 2013–14, while at the same time, funding from student fees decreased from 15% to 13%.

=== Federal Transfers to Newfoundland and Labrador ===
The Government of Canada provides financial support to the Government of Newfoundland and Labrador through Canada Health Transfer and Canada Social Transfer payments as well as other arrangements, such as Offshore Accords. The transfers are distinct from equalization payments that go to some provinces to reduce disparities in provincial revenues and in the provinces’ capacity to fund the full range of government services in those provinces. The current system makes it difficult to discern any link between the transfers and provincial funding of postsecondary institutions. Funding for post-secondary through the Canada Social Transfer has increased steadily from $243,500,000 in 2007–08 to $353,500,000 in 2011–12 with the largest single increase of almost 33% occurring in 2008–09. However, Canada Social Transfer has decreased as a part of total federal transfers from 20.3% to 19.8% during the same period.

=== Research Funding ===
Memorial University has been associated more and more with its research and has experienced a surge in research expenditures and activity over the past 10–15 years. From 1995 to 2005 there was a 215% increase in research expenditures, which is a much larger increase over other areas during the same period. Since that time, funding has remained relatively stable with just an 11% increase in 2010 over 2005. In 2013 research funding surpassed $100,000,000.

In 2005–06, over 30% of research funding came from Canadian (22.4%) or foreign (8.2%) businesses or individuals. This distribution had been historically stable, but shifted beginning in 2006–07 to 13.4% from Canadian and 10.0% from foreign businesses and individuals. This distribution stabilized again as evidenced by the 2009-10 distribution of 12% from each of domestic and foreign business and individual sources.

=== Tuition ===
Since the early 1990s, average Canadian tuition fees have increased nearly three times for undergraduate students from $1,464 in 1990–91 to $4,347 in 2006–07. By 2014-15 this national average is expected to reach $5,959. In order to keep post secondary education affordable, and in an effort to keep enrolment high, the government of Newfoundland began a program to freeze tuition fees in 1999–2001. Since then, the provincial government has steadily increased core funding to the College of the North Atlantic and Memorial University. After funding cuts over the previous years, these increases have resulted in both institutions now receiving nearly the same funding they had at the beginning of the 1990s. In an even bigger move, from 2002 to 2005, tuition was lowered each year for a total decrease of 22.7%, then frozen again. In the 2008 Speech from the Throne, it was announced that the freeze will continue for a further four years. In the most recent Fact Sheet of Budget 2015, the government states that it will continue to support the tuition freeze. In lieu of tuition increases, the White Paper on Public Post-Secondary Education recommended that the Government of Newfoundland and Labrador provide increased funding to MUN and CNA as follows: $4.3M in 2005–06; $8.9M in 2006–07; and $12.4M in 2007–08.

This replacement funding was followed by a commitment in the 2008 Provincial Budget of $56 million over the next four years specifically to continue the tuition freeze at Memorial University and the College of the North Atlantic. As a result, Newfoundland and Labrador's public post-secondary tuition has been second only to Quebec's in Canada for some years. For 2012–13, Quebec's average undergraduate tuition per student stood at $2,565 compared to $2,649 for Newfoundland and Labrador. However, starting from 2013 to 2014, Newfoundland and Labrador's undergraduate tuition fees for Canadian students became the lowest of $2,631, while Quebec's tuition was $2,657. The average tuition fees for undergraduate full-time Canadian students in Canada were $5,767 in that year.

=== Student Aid ===
Based on actions taken in the 2007 Budget, significant improvements to the student aid program saw Newfoundland and Labrador at the national forefront in reducing provincial student loan debt. The budget provided for a $14.4 million investment to help current and former students reduce their debt-load. Interest charged on student loans was reduced from prime plus 2.5 per cent to prime, at a cost of $3.7 million annually. An up-front, needs-based grant program was introduced, providing financial assistance of approximately $10.7 million annually. The grant split the maximum weekly allowance of $140 into a $70 a week repayable loan and a $70 a week non-repayable grant. This provides the same level of funding, yet reduces the amount of money students with the highest need will borrow. It is also the first time that students in one- and two-year programs at the College of the North Atlantic and private colleges will qualify for a non-repayable grant.

The 2009 Budget introduced even more changes for Student Aid in Newfoundland and Labrador. Interest on the Provincial portion of student loans was eliminated completely. The split in aid between loans and grants was changed to $60 per week in loan and $80 per week in grant thus increasing the amount of assistance available in up-front, non-repayable, needs-based grants. Also, to help married students access financial assistance, this budget decreased the required amount of spousal contribution. The budget provided $5 million to cover the cost of these initiatives.

The 2015 Budget continues to support the elimination of provincial students loans by investing $12.6 million and the students loans will be replaced with non-repayable grants.

== Participation ==
Newfoundland and Labrador's Higher Education Institutions are impacted by a changing demographic profile. They need to be able to adapt to demographic and labor market trends and respond to changing training needs. Some of these trends include:

=== An aging population ===
Demographics of western industrialized nations are heavily influenced by the high fertility rates and births that occurred in the 20-year period that followed World War II. This baby boom period ended midway through the 1960s. Since then, these countries are experiencing a shift in demographics such that there is an increased, disproportionate aging population. This is also evident in Newfoundland and Labrador. Overall population in the province grew from 361,416 in 1951 to a historical high of 580,109 in 1992. The population then began to decline and is projected to be roughly 481,000 in 2021. In 1951 there were 39.1% aged 0–14 and 6.5% aged 65+, by 2020 those numbers are expected to jump to 12.6% and 23.1% respectively.

In order to increase the province's population, the Budget 2015 introduces an investment of $500,000 to implement the Population Growth Strategy.

=== Net out-migration of youth ===
The net migration of Newfoundland and Labrador has been negative for many years as traditionally there have been more people leaving the province than moving in. The province does not provide sufficient jobs or income in the natural resources industries which the economy is heavily dependent on. Young people mainly leave for employment opportunities and better education in other provinces. The net out-migration reached a very high rate following the collapse of cod fishery in 1992 which marked the largest industrial closure in Canadian history. The trend slowed down as the economic shocks were absorbed in the next few years. The increase happened again in 2005 when the economy of Alberta was booming and attracting a lot of workers for construction jobs.

The youth population has declined by almost half from 1986 to 2007, more in rural areas. The number of university-age students (18-24) in Newfoundland and Labrador dropped 27% between 1990 and 2000 and another 6% between 2000 and 2005. Comparatively there was a less than 1% drop in the number of 18- to 24-year-olds in Canada between 1990 and 2000 followed by a 7% increase between the years 2000 and 2005. According to Statistics Canada youth age groups 17 to 29 are those most relevant for post-secondary participation. They predict that in Newfoundland and Labrador this population segment will decline continuously through 2031 as will the number of this segment that participates in postsecondary education in the province.

=== Graduate migration ===
For the class of 2000, Newfoundland and Labrador experienced a net out-flow of university graduates equal to 5.2% of the size of the university graduating class, and a net out-flow of college graduates equal to 15.4% of the size of the college graduating class. However, the 23% tuition decrease from 2000–01 to 2003-04 and subsequent tuition freeze at Memorial University has resulted in a 50% decline in the number of undergraduate students from Newfoundland and Labrador leaving to attend other universities in Atlantic Canada. In 2000-01 Newfoundland and Labrador students made up 4% of the undergraduate population of Maritime universities, but in 2007 this number had declined to only 2%.

Overall, participation in post-secondary education in Newfoundland and Labrador is higher than the national average at approximately 32% in 2005. This represents an 8% increase since 2000.

==== Memorial University (MUN) Enrolment Summary (2013) ====
Undergraduates		Graduates	
Full-time:	12,045	Full-time:	2142
Part-time:	2163	Part-time:	1423

==== College of the North Atlantic (CNA) Enrolment Summary (2013) ====
Full-time:	8,250
Part-time:	1,796
Cont. Ed.:	17,924

== Accessibility ==
=== Adult learning ===
The aging population of Newfoundland and Labrador requires that Memorial University of Newfoundland (MUN) promote and raise the profile of adult learning among the general public. Its Division of Lifelong Learning offers an extensive selection of credit and non-credit courses and programs available online and on-campus. Consideration of adult learners is also of key interest at the College of the North Atlantic, which has all 17 campus locations offering some level of Adult Basic Education (ABE). The Comprehensive Arts and Science Transition program is designed for high school and ABE graduates who would like to improve their general employability skills or who are lacking either the academic courses or required grades for admission into their chosen college program. In the 2010 Provincial Budget, the Government allocated and additional $2.3million to implement a new strategic literacy plan.

=== Rural participation ===
Rural people in Newfoundland and Labrador and are among the least educated in the province. According to a Government Canada report from 2014 on the rural population in NewFoundland and Labrador only 1.83% of people living in an area with no metropolitan influence had a university education compared to 17.4% in urban areas. This is an issue for the province as many national and multinational firms have stated how the lack of qualified labour in rural areas is one of their major hurdles in rural Canada and the province is interested in finding ways to combat the unemployment and income disparity experienced in rural areas.

Memorial University is an example of an innovative approach to education delivery from remote communities. It offers courses online (around 450), through correspondence, teleconferencing and satellite links. It has also partnered with the community college system to offer first year university studies at select college campuses throughout the province. Accessibility to rural areas is also facilitated through cohort programs available through the university that combine distance and local delivery. The College of the North Atlantic has a Distributed Learning Service (DLS) in each of the college's 17 campuses. It offers programs and services through on-campus instruction, correspondence, mobile teaching units, distance education and community outreach. Students from rural areas have the opportunity to visit educational facilities such as Memorial University through the Intra-Provincial Travel Program. This program allows these students to realize the potential for opportunities beyond high school.

=== Apprenticeship training ===
The 2007 Budget allocated $300,000 for apprenticeship training to allow apprentices to be hired by health boards, school boards, and Newfoundland and Labrador Housing. In addition, Memorial University is being provided with $200,000, allowing them to hire an additional seven individuals through this initiative. Overall, almost $10 million was provided in 2007 to improve the apprenticeship system at different levels.

To recognize on-going changes in the skilled-labour market the Government of Newfoundland and Labrador struck a Skills Task Force in March 2006. Among the 50 recommendations in the report published in March 2007 was the creation of an Industry Coordinating Committee with representation from business, labour, industry, education, the Provincial Government and non-governmental agencies. This committee held a follow-up forum in May 2009.

In its 2011 Budget, the Newfoundland and Labrador Government again moved to strengthen apprenticeship training by providing "$15.4 million over three years to provide additional incentives to employers to hire apprentices, especially from under-represented groups." In April 2011, the Government introduced a $2.6 million Wage Subsidy Program to address issues apprentices have had in finding employment by providing a financial incentive to employers to offset the salary of apprentices.

Another $20 million will be invested to revitalize the apprenticeship system according to the Budget 2015. It will be used for skilled trade development and a variety of initiatives.

=== Discrimination and special needs ===
==== Women's participation ====
Memorial University is working to create opportunities for women in non-traditional fields. An example of this is its recent application to and permission granted by the Human Rights Commission to hire as many female apprentices as possible in the next round of hiring. Although general gender equity has been satisfied in Atlantic Canada's higher education institutions, areas such as technology, science and engineering are still working towards achieving it. Memorial University's ‘Women in Science and Engineering’ is one such program offered to help attain this goal.

==== Aboriginal participation ====
Although the aboriginal population is growing, Newfoundland and Labrador faces challenges recruiting aboriginals because of low education attainment levels and low literacy rates among the Innu and Inuit adult populations. The Labrador institute of MUN and the Happy Valley-Goose Bay Campus of the College of the North Atlantic provide a college-University Transfer year option. This program is co-designed between the two institutions to promote better success for aboriginal students. Post-secondary offerings in Labrador include Adult Basic Education, transition and university transfer courses, business, applied arts, trades and technology programs offered at the Labrador West and Happy Valley-Goose Bay campuses of the CNA, as well as an Aboriginal Bridging Program at the Happy Valley-Goose Bay campus of CNA. The 2008 Budget allocated $60,000 to establish an Aboriginal Literacy Development Consultant in Labrador. An additional $250,000 was allocated to assess facility requirements necessary to accommodate aboriginal enrolment at the College of North Atlantic in Happy Valley-Goose Bay.

Memorial University continues to secure access to the Post Secondary Student Support Program (PSSSP) for members of the federation of the Newfoundland Indians and Labrador Métis Nation. The Aboriginal Human Resource Development Agreement (AHRDA) has helped to fund over 100 students in Newfoundland and Labrador in the 2007–08 school year. In mid November 2007, thirty bursaries were given to Métis students attending university. Memorial University's Faculty of Education has developed a distance education program for Nunavut students as well as a professional development certificate program for their teachers. The College of the North Atlantic's new Integrated Nursing Access Program allows Inuit students to stay in Labrador for the 3-year access program and the 2nd year of the BN (Collaborative) Program. Students will then do the 3rd and 4th years of the program at Corner Brook. In November 2011, Memorial's Presidential Task Force on Aboriginal Initiatives that grew out of the university's Strategic Plan issued its report. The report contains 22 integrated recommendations under four themes.

==== Students with disabilities ====
Memorial University, through The Glenn Roy Blundon Centre, established in 1992, is committed to providing and coordinating programs and services for students with disabilities so that they can achieve their maximum academic potential. The College of the North Atlantic received funding in 2006 to hire six new Disability Service Coordinators to assist students with needs. The college has invested in initiatives to improve access to a range of services for students with disabilities at increased campus locations. To ensure all learners have the opportunity to succeed, the College of the North Atlantic's Access for Success (AFS) initiative is designed to improve both student access and student retention. AFS involves the assessment of students’ strengths and needs, the development of personal career plans, the use of a student success tracking computer program, and structured academic advising to ensure students are well suited to their program of choice, even prior to attending the college. In the 2011 Budget, the Government of Newfoundland and Labrador committed to $400,000 in interim funding to begin the implementation of the Provincial Strategy for the Inclusion of Persons with Disabilities. This strategy stemmed from public consultations conducted in 2010.

== Transferability ==
While there is a common application process for individual community college campuses within each provincial community college system, there is no common application across provinces or across universities. The Community College system partners with the university to offer first year university courses at a number of campuses as well as credit transfers within provinces across Atlantic Canada which have been maintained through individual articulation agreements.

=== Articulation, Transfer and Admission Committee (ATAC) ===
The committee's main objective is to maximize student accessibility and enhance mobility among post-secondary institutions. It accomplishes this by coordinating the articulation process between public schools, Memorial University and the College of the North Atlantic as well as addressing province-wide issues that related to articulation practices, transfer and admission. ATAC compiles and distributes a print and online transfer guide, listing course-by-course and program block transfers.

=== Atlantic Provinces Community College Consortium (APCCC) ===
The APCCC comprises the four provincial college systems; Nova Scotia Community College, the College of the North Atlantic in Newfoundland and Labrador, Holland College in Prince Edward Island, and New Brunswick Community College. Its responsibility is coordinating activities among the four provincial college systems and sharing resources and expertise among the education and training community colleges across the whole of the Atlantic Canada region. The APCCC produces an annual "Guide to Block Transfer Agreements". These guides include the current and active Memorandum of Understanding between the 4 college systems, Guidelines for the Development and Operation of Transfer Arrangements, the Association of Canadian Community College's Pan Canadian Protocol for the Transferability of Learning, and a Memorandum of Understanding between the Association of Atlantic Universities (AAU) and the APCCC. The guide also includes a listing of programs at the various Colleges and Universities that agree to recognize those programs for block transfer towards a new educational credential. Students can choose from several course delivery mechanisms, including distance e-learning.

=== Comprehensive Arts and Science (CAS) Transfer: College-University ===
The College of the North Atlantic (CNA) offers the CAS Transfer: College-University program (formerly known as the college-University Transfer Year) at their five campuses in Burin, Carbonear, Grand Falls-Windsor, Happy Valley-Goose Bay, and Labrador West. CAN and Memorial University of Newfoundland (MU) developed this program to provide university credit for specific college courses. Currently, 36 courses are transferable. The program provides students with the opportunity to complete a suite of courses for which they will gain credit from CAN as well as from MU. It has been developed through an agreement with Memorial University of Newfoundland; courses identified in this section are developed in collaboration with Memorial's respective departments. This enhances student access to courses that earn both university and college credits. It provides an opportunity for students to gain university course credit at locations close to their home communities. It allows students to choose career paths with maximum recognition of credit for work completed.

== See also ==
- List of universities in Canada
- List of colleges in Canada
- List of business schools in Canada
- List of law schools in Canada
- List of Canadian universities by endowment
- Higher education in Canada
