= FrancoForum =

Francoforum - Institut de Langue Française
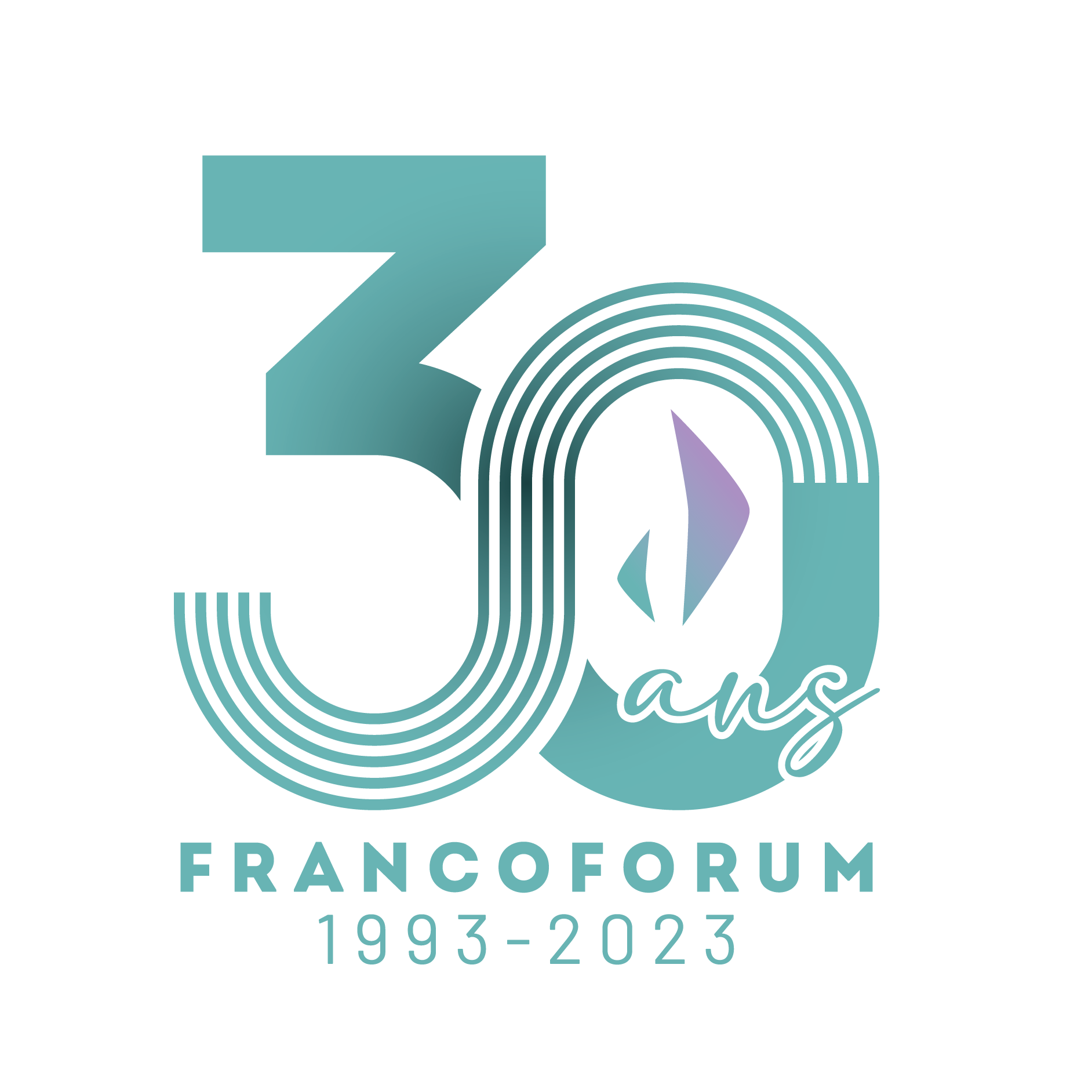

Location
- Boulevard Port-en-bessin; Saint-Pierre, Saint-Pierre and Miquelon; France; 46°46′28″N 56°10′41″W

Information
- School type: Language school - FLE
- Established: 1973 (Le Programme Frecker)
- Enrollment: 29
- Language: French
- Website: www.lefrancoforum.com

The FrancoForum is a specialized language teaching facility owned and operated by the local government in Saint-Pierre and Miquelon, a French collectivity located off the coast of Newfoundland, Canada. Staffed by professional French instructors, the institute offers a variety of courses for both students and teachers wishing to improve their fluency.

Because of its proximity to English-speaking Canada, Saint-Pierre has become a popular destination for anglophone students wishing to become immersed in French language and culture. The Newfoundland and Labrador branch of the Canadian Parents for French organization holds a yearly summer camp program at the FrancoForum. The Francoforum is accredited by the Public Service of Canada for French language training of civil servants.

== Frecker Program ==
The FrancoForum was best known for hosting Le Programme Frecker, a 3-month French immersion program offered to students at Memorial University of Newfoundland. The program, which began in 1973, was originally housed in a small building at the centre of town. In 1992, an agreement was reached with the Conseil Général of Saint-Pierre and Miquelon to relocate the program to the newly built FrancoForum. The program ended in 2026. In its final year, it hosted 10 students.
