= Memorial University of Newfoundland =

Public university in Newfoundland, Canada

- Coat of arms
- Former name: Memorial University College
- Motto: Provehito in Altum (Latin)
- Motto in English: Launch forth into the deep
- Type: Public
- Established: 1925; 101 years ago
- Endowment: CAD$159 million
- Chancellor: Earl Ludlow
- President: Janet Morrison
- Visitor: Joan Marie Aylward (as Lieutenant Governor of Newfoundland and Labrador)
- Faculty: 1,330
- Administrative staff: 2,474
- Students: 16,578 (Fall 2026)
- Undergraduates: 12,584
- Postgraduates: 3,994
- Location: St. John's, NL, Canada; 47°34′21″N 52°44′4″W
- Campus: Urban St. John's: 279 acres (113 ha) Grenfell: 185 acres (75 ha) Harlow: 25 acres (10 ha)
Colours
- Nickname: Sea-Hawks
- Sporting affiliations: AUS; U SPORTS
- Mascot: Sammy Sea-Hawk
- Website: mun.ca

Memorial University of Newfoundland, or MUN (/mʌn/), is a public research university in the province of Newfoundland and Labrador, based in St. John's, with satellite campuses in Corner Brook, Happy Valley-Goose Bay, and Harlow, England. Memorial University offers certificate, diploma, undergraduate, graduate, and post-graduate programs, as well as online courses and degrees.

Founded in September 1925 as a memorial to Newfoundlanders and Labradorians who died in the First World War, Memorial is the largest university in Atlantic Canada; it is also Newfoundland and Labrador's only university. As of 2018, there were 1,330 faculty and 2,474 staff, supporting 18,000 students from nearly 100 countries.

== History ==
=== Founding ===
At its founding, Newfoundland was a dominion of the British Empire. Memorial University began as Memorial University College (MUC), which opened in September 1925 at a campus on Parade Street in St. John's. It was founded to honour to those who died in World War I, to provide a way of educating school teachers for the local religious schools, and to offer students higher education locally. Before that, there was no high-ranking post-secondary education in the dominion; students often went to Canada, the United Kingdom, or the United States. Students were first admitted into a non-degree program in 1925. The original location on Parade Street in St. Johns was established with the help of a grant from the Carnegie Corporation of New York.

The college was established as a memorial to the Newfoundlanders who had lost their lives on active service during the First World War. It was later rededicated also to encompass the province's war dead of the Second World War.

The first president was John Lewis Paton. It offered the first two years of university studies. MUC's initial enrolment was 57 students, which peaked at over 400 in the 1940s. In 1933, it merged with the adjacent Normal School and took responsibility for teacher training.

=== Early period ===
The period from the founding in 1925 until 1949 in Newfoundland was chaotic, reflecting Newfoundland's shifting economic and political situation, from the last flowering of independence to depression and life on the dole. The 1940 discovery of Newfoundland as a strategic military asset brought a new period of prosperity.

Newfoundland gave up dominion status in 1934, ending self-government in exchange for British Commission of Government rule as a crown colony. Newfoundland remained a crown colony until it joined Canada as a province in 1949.

The post-Confederation government elevated the status of Memorial University College to full university status in August 1949, renaming the institution to Memorial University of Newfoundland. Memorial University was established by the Memorial University Act.

The enrolment in Memorial's first year was 307 students.

=== Expansion ===
In 1959, Memorial pioneered the Extension Service as a model for field education and community development.

In 1961, enrolment increased to 1400, and Memorial moved from Parade Street to its present location on Elizabeth Avenue (St. John's Campus).

On 8 March 1965, the government of Newfoundland announced free tuition for first-year students enrolled at Memorial University in St. John's. The Faculty of Medicine of Memorial University of Newfoundland was established in 1967, and the first students were admitted in 1969. It admits approximately 80 students into the M.D. program each year and also offers MSc and PhD programs.

Memorial maintains a campus in Harlow, England which opened to students in 1969. This campus has been a popular location for internships in education, and now offers credit courses, work terms, and internships in a number of areas. The campus accommodates approximately 50 students.

Memorial established the Institut Frecker in St. Pierre in 1973, to offer one-semester French immersion programs. It was housed in a building provided by the Archdiocese of St. Pierre until 2000. Now known as the Program Frecker, it is run from the FrancoForum, a language teaching facility owned by the government of St. Pierre. The program is partially supported by the governments of Canada and Newfoundland and Labrador.

In September 1975, a campus was opened in Corner Brook; it was first renamed Sir Wilfred Grenfell College in 1979 and renamed again in 2010 as Grenfell Campus, Memorial University of Newfoundland. 1300 students attend Grenfell, which offers full degree programs in several disciplines and partial programs in many other subjects which can be completed at the St. John's campus.

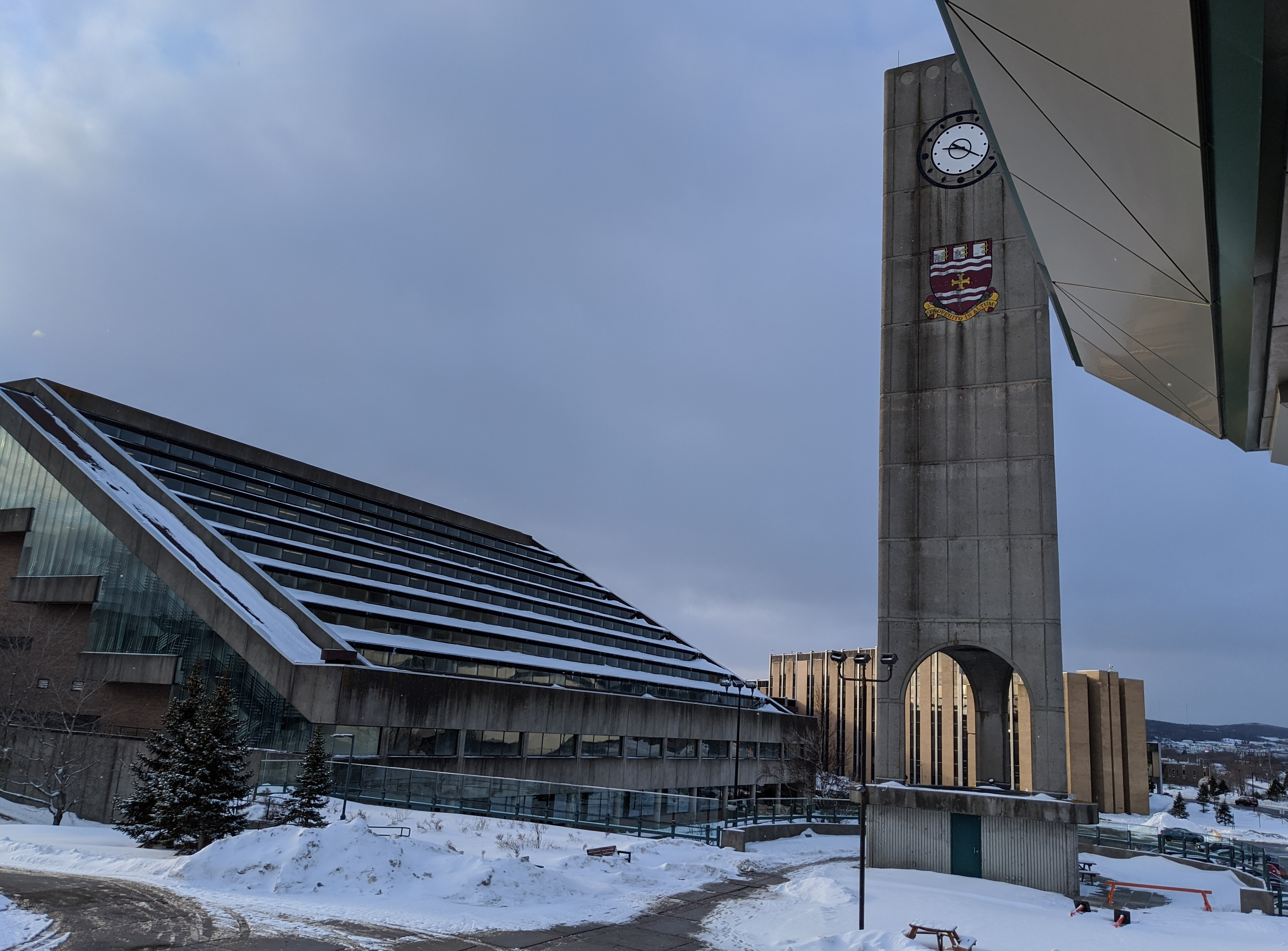
MUN Clock Tower and QEII Library exterior

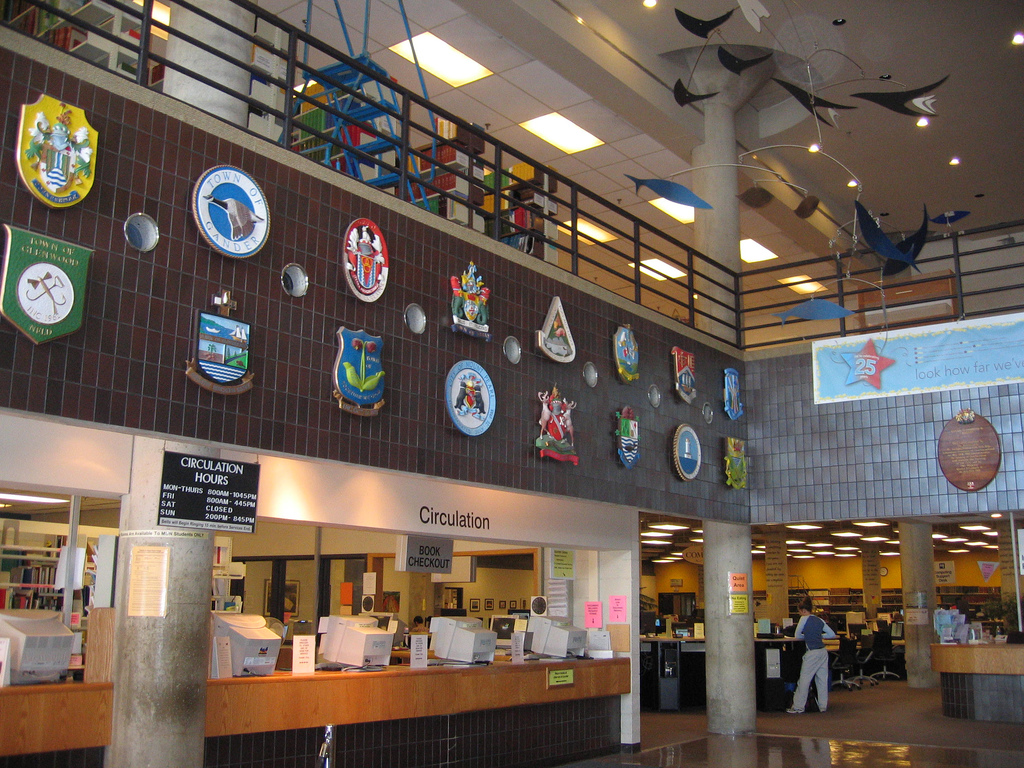
QEII Library interior

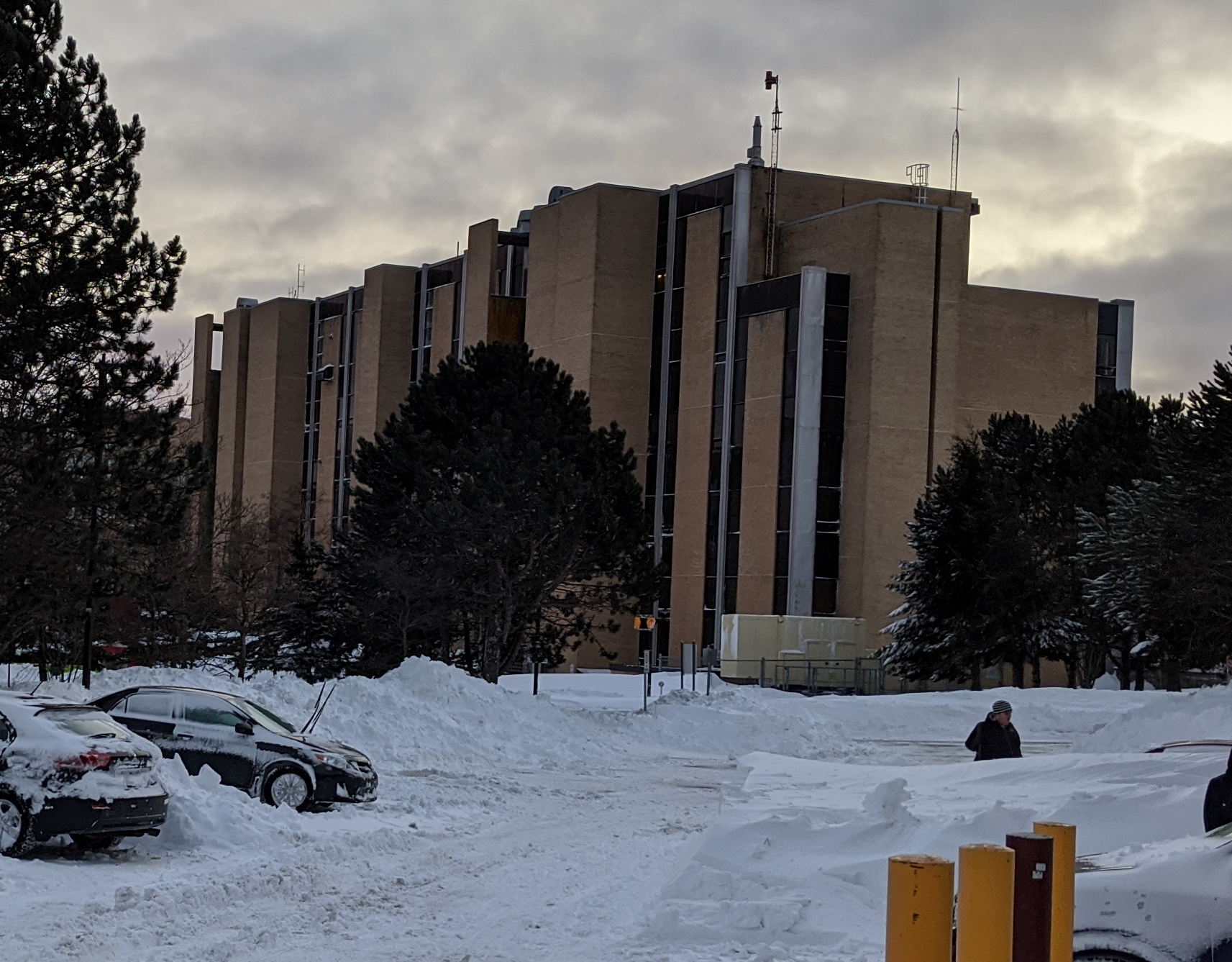
Chemistry-Physics Building

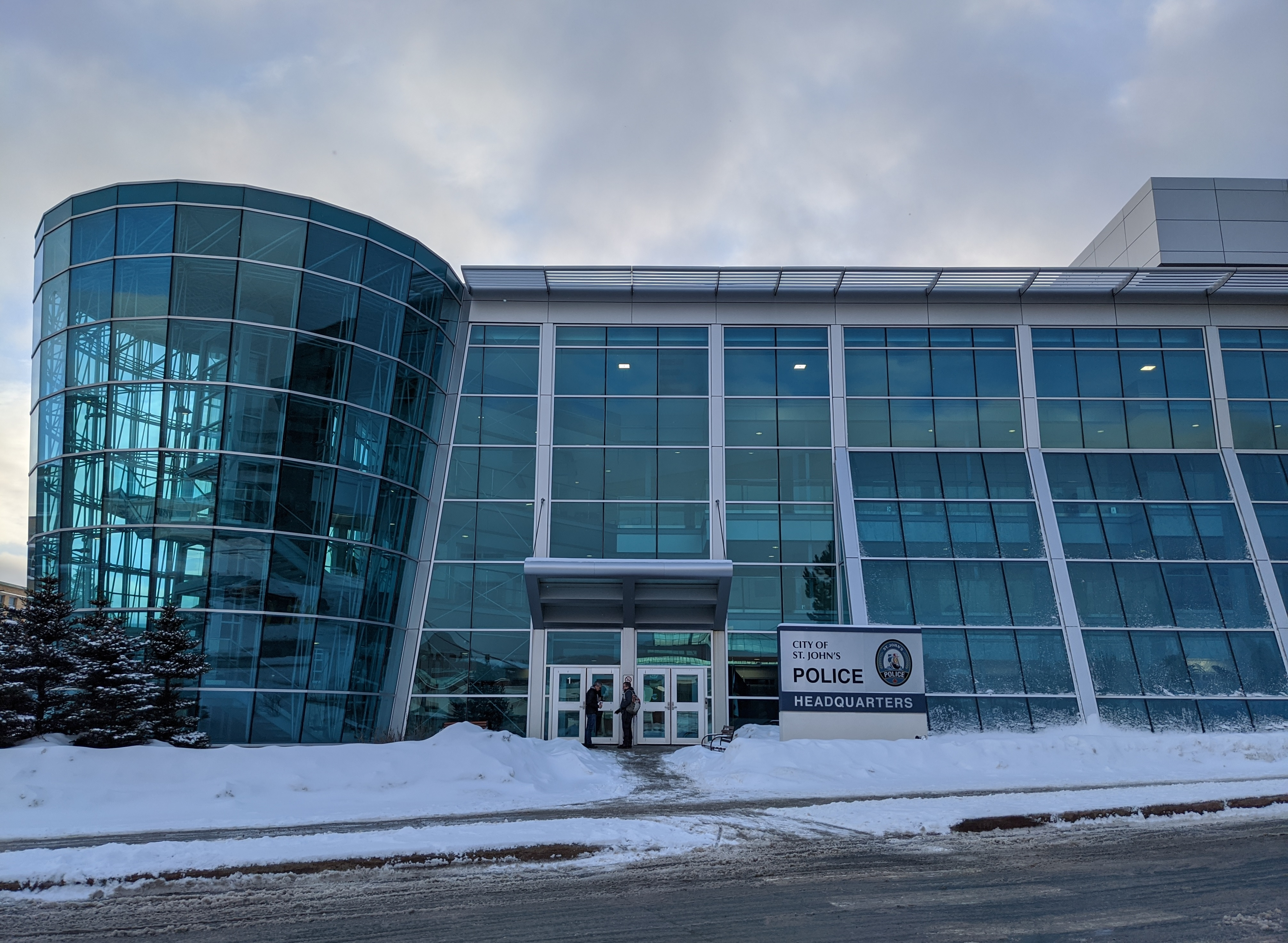
Bruneau Centre (taken during filming of Hudson & Rex)

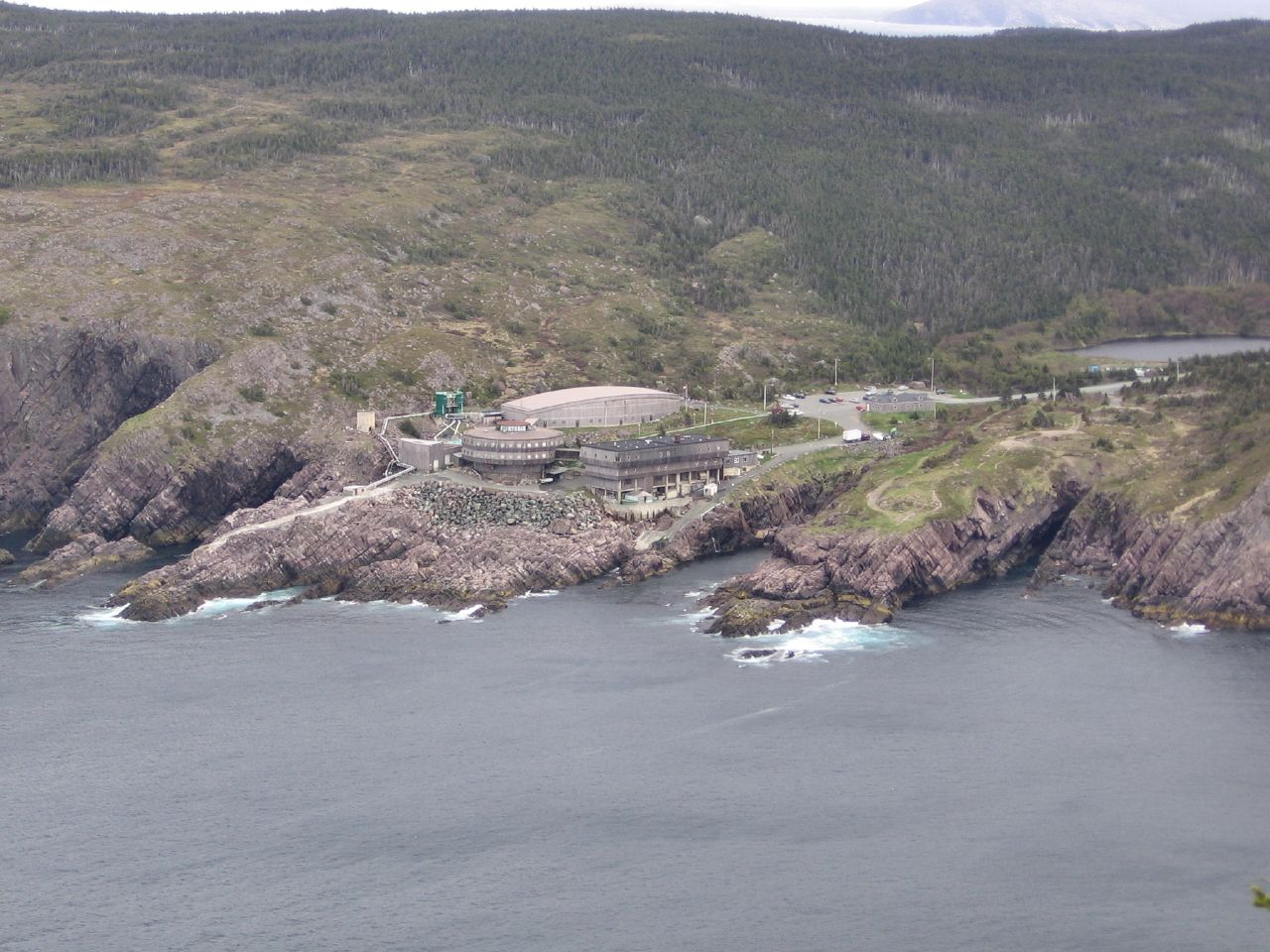
Ocean Sciences Centre

In 1977, the Memorial University of Newfoundland Educational Television Centre implemented the Telemedicine project.

In 1992, the Institute of Fisheries and Marine Technology in St. John's became affiliated with Memorial University as the Fisheries and Marine Institute of Memorial University of Newfoundland. Today, it is named the Marine Institute of Memorial University of Newfoundland. It offers both degree and non-degree programs.

In the early 1990s, open-source collaboration between the Department of Computer Science and the Department of Computing and Communications produced the LabNet system, which today remains the underlying network of computers at Memorial (particularly in the Library Commons).

=== The modern day ===
In 2008, the university's hiring process for incoming presidents came under scrutiny for political interference by the province's education minister, Joan Shea.

In May 2021, the Board of Regents of Memorial University recommended that the institution should proceed with officially changing its name to Memorial University of Newfoundland and Labrador. However, changing the university's legal name will require an act of the province's House of Assembly, and has not yet taken effect.

In September 2019, the Memorial University Senate voted unanimously to create a degree-granting campus in Labrador. Memorial University subsequently established the School of Arctic and Sub-Arctic Studies in 2020. A campus in Happy Valley-Goose Bay (renovated from the former provincial courthouse on Hamilton River Road) was expected to offer courses in fall 2022.

In October 2023, a report by the Auditor-General found several concerns with the University's operations and expenses.

=== Presidents ===
- John Lewis Paton (1925–1933)
- Albert Hatcher (1933–1952)
- Raymond Gushue (1952–1966)
- Moses Morgan (pro tempore, 1966–1967)
- The Rt. Hon. The Lord Taylor of Harlow (1967–1973)
- Moses Morgan (1973–1981)
- Leslie Harris (1981–1990)
- Arthur May (1990–1999)
- Axel Meisen (1999–2007)
- Eddy Campbell (acting, 2008–2009)
- Chris Loomis (pro tempore, 2009–2010)
- Gary Kachanoski (2010–2020)
- Vianne Timmons (2020–2023)
- Neil Bose (pro tempore, 2023–April 2025)
- Jennifer Lokash (pro tempore, April–August 2025)
- Janet Morrison (from August 2025)

=== Chancellors ===
- Viscount Rothermere of Hemsted (1952–1961)
- Lord Thomson of Fleet (1961–1968)
- G. Alain Frecker (1971–1979)
- Paul G. Desmarais (1979–1988)
- John Crosbie (1994–2008)
- Rick Hillier (2008–2012)
- Susan Dyer Knight (2012–2022)
- Earl Ludlow (2022–present)

=== Motto, shield, and arms ===
The university's motto is Provehito in Altum, 'to launch forth into the deep.' The arms of the university, designed by Alan Beddoe, have as their charges a cross moline, three books, and waves representing the sea, and were registered with the Canadian Heraldic Authority on 10 September 1992.

== Academics ==
=== Schools and faculties ===
Memorial has seven faculties (Business Administration, Education, Engineering, Humanities and Social Sciences, Medicine, Nursing, and Science) and seven Schools (Arctic and Subarctic Studies, Fine Arts, Graduate Studies, Music, Pharmacy, Human Kinetics and Recreation, and Social Work). These offer undergraduate and graduate degree programs.

Memorial's University Faculty of Business Administration offering programs at undergraduate and graduate levels, including a Bachelor of Commerce, International Bachelor of Business Administration, Bachelor of Business Administration, Master of Business Administration, Master of Employment Relations and Ph.D. programs.

Students can choose to specialize in the following engineering disciplines: Civil Engineering, Computer Engineering, Electrical Engineering, Mechanical Engineering, Ocean and Naval Architectural Engineering (combined degree), Engineering Management, and Process Engineering.

The St. John's campus is home to the Faculty of Medicine, co-located with the Newfoundland Health Science Center General Hospital. The Faculty of Medicine grants undergraduate and graduate degrees in medicine while also providing residential and advanced training. It is one of only four medical schools in Atlantic Canada (the others are Dalhousie University Faculty of Medicine, University of New Brunswick Medical Training Centre and Université de Moncton Medical Training Centre.

The Department of Biochemistry has a dietetic program accredited by the Dietitians of Canada, and the university's graduates may subsequently become registered dietitians.

Queen's College, an affiliated College of Memorial University, offers diploma and degree studies in theology, pastoral studies, church history, and related programs. It is an associate member of the Association of Theological Schools in the United States and Canada with 166 students.

The university operates the Bonne Bay Marine Station in Gros Morne National Park.

=== Research ===
Research at Memorial University spans six faculties and six schools on the St. John's campus, three at the Grenfell Campus, and three at the Marine Institute, covering a broad range of basic, interdisciplinary, and applied research topics. It also includes centres in marine learning that study ocean technology, aquaculture, sustainable fishery, and offshore safety. Over 40% of Memorial's research is ocean-related (68% in the Faculty of Science alone).

Memorial University joined with Dalhousie University and the University of Prince Edward Island to form the Ocean Frontier Institute, a collaborative research initiative aimed at harnessing the potential of the world's oceans. Memorial University is a member of the University of the Arctic, an international cooperative network of universities, colleges, and other organizations concerned with education and research in Arctic region. Memorial is also a member of the International Association of Universities, Universities Canada, Association of Commonwealth Universities, Canadian Virtual University, and the Canadian Bureau for International Education.

In 2009, Memorial University launched Yaffle to provide researchers and community partners an opportunity to connect and exchange ideas, expertise, research interests, and publicly engaged activities in an open and accessible way. Yaffle is managed by the Leslie Harris Centre of Regional Policy and Development at Memorial University.

==== Research impact ====
Out of 50 universities in Canada, Research Infosource ranked Memorial University the 20th most research-intensive for fiscal year 2016, with a sponsored research income of $91.178 million, averaging $93,500 per faculty member. Times Higher Education ranked Memorial University 17th among Canadian universities for subject-normalised total citations.

According to Memorial University's President's Report 2017, Memorial's total research funding for the fiscal year 2016-17 was over $100 million. Memorial is the seat of 20 active Canada Research Chairs and 13 sponsored research chairs.

==== Research centres and institutes ====
Memorial University operates and manages over 30 research units. Some fall under the direct authority of their respective faculties or schools, while others have a pan-university mandate or multi-organization consortium. Below is a sampling of the more prominent units:

- Aging Research Centre – Newfoundland and Labrador
- Autonomous Oceans Systems Laboratory
- Bonne Bay Marine Station
- Boreal Ecosystem Research Initiative, Grenfell Campus
- Bruneau Centre for Excellence in Choral Music
- Centre for Applied Ocean Technology, Marine Institute
- Centre for Aquaculture and Seafood Development (CASD), Marine Institute
- Centre for Fisheries Ecosystems Research, Marine Institute
- Centre for Marine Simulation (CMS), Marine Institute
- Centre for Sustainable Aquatic Resources (CSAR), Marine Institute
- Craig L. Dobbin Genetics Research Centre
- Digital Research Centre for Qualitative Fieldwork
- eHealth Research Unit
- English Language Research Centre
- Environmental Policy Institute, Grenfell Campus
- Folklore and Language Archive (MUNFLA)
- Health Research Unit
- Hibernia Enhanced Oil Recovery Laboratory
- Institute of Social and Economic Research
- Janeway Pediatric Research Unit
- Lewisporte Regional Fisheries and Marine Centre
- Maritime History Archive
- Newfoundland and Labrador Centre for Applied Health Research
- North West River Research Station, Labrador Institute
- Nursing Research Unit
- Ocean Engineering Research Centre (OERC)
- Ocean Frontier Institute (OFI)
- Ocean Sciences Centre
- Offshore Safety and Survival Centre (OSSC), Marine Institute
- Primary Healthcare Research Unit
- Research Centre for the Study of Music, Media, and Place (MMaP)
- SafetyNet
- Support for People and Patient-Oriented Research and Trials (SUPPORT) Unit
- The Centre for Risk, Integrity and Safety Engineering (CRISE)
- The J.R. Smallwood Foundation for Newfoundland and Labrador Studies

==== Research awards and honours ====
Fellows of the Royal Society of Canada	29
RSC College of New Scholars, Artists, and Scientists	4
Trudeau Fellows	2
Canadian Academy of Engineering Fellows	16
Canadian Academy of Health Services Fellows	11
Social Sciences and Humanities Research Council Impact Awards Gold Medal	1
Social Sciences and Humanities Research Council Insight Award	1
Social Sciences and Humanities Research Council Talent Awards	1
Arctic Inspiration Prize	2

=== Exchange programs ===
Memorial has 134 student programs, exchanges, and research partnership agreements in 40 countries. The Internationalization Office, formerly the International Student Advising Office, assists international students with housing, health insurance, academics, immigration, and career options. Memorial also has a British campus in Harlow, Essex, and is one of only two universities in Canada with a foothold in the United Kingdom.

=== Arctic research ===
Memorial University of Newfoundland is an active member of the University of the Arctic. UArctic is an international cooperative network based in the Circumpolar Arctic region, consisting of more than 200 universities, colleges, and other organizations with an interest in promoting education and research in the Arctic region.

The university participates in UArctic’s mobility program north2north. The aim of that program is to enable students of member institutions to study in different parts of the North.

=== Rankings ===
University rankings

World rankings
- ARWU World: 701–800
- QS World: =660
- THE World: 601–800
- USNWR World: 698
- 23–24

Canadian rankings
- QS National: 24–26
- THE National: 20–27
- USNWR National: 22
- Maclean's Comprehensive: 7

In Maclean's 2023 Canadian university rankings, Memorial University of Newfoundland placed seventh in the magazine's comprehensive university category. The university has also placed in several global university rankings. In 2022 Academic Ranking of World Universities, the university ranked 701–800 worldwide. The 2024 QS World University Rankings ranked the university 601-649 in the world. 2023 Times Higher Education World University Rankings placed the university 601–800 in the world. In the U.S. News & World Report 2022–23 ranking, the university placed 698th in the world.

== Campuses and facilities ==
Memorial University has the following campuses: St. John's Campus on Elizabeth Avenue, Signal Hill, St. John's, Grenfell Campus, Corner Brook, Bonne Bay Marine Station, Holyrood Marine Base, Labrador Institute, Happy Valley-Goose Bay, Ocean Sciences Centre, Institut Frecker on the French island of St-Pierre, off Newfoundland's south coast, and in Harlow, England. The largest campus in St. John's, Newfoundland and Labrador is split by Prince Philip Drive. The university also operates the Memorial University of Newfoundland Botanical Garden.

=== St. John's Campus ===
The largest campus is located in St. John's. Prince Philip Drive runs east–west through the St. John's campus, with Westerland Road bordering it to the west, Elizabeth Avenue to the south, and Allandale Road to the east. The majority of the academic buildings are located south of Prince Philip Drive: the Arts and Administration Building, the Science Building, Chemistry and Physics, Mathematics, Music, Education, Physical Education, and the Bruneau Centre for Research and Innovation. The University Centre is home to the food court, bookstore, campus bar ("Breezeway"), and the CHMR-FM campus radio station.

==== Libraries and archives ====
The Memorial University Libraries contain collections of university Archives, Fine Arts from the 1880s to present; Human History and Natural Sciences. Memorial University of Newfoundland Folklore and Language Archive collection consists of manuscripts, tapes, records, photographs and artifacts pertaining to Maritime Provinces, specifically Newfoundland and Labrador. The Queen Elizabeth II Library contains around 1,100,000 monographs, 105,000 maps, 6,000 audio-visual titles and 9,000 journal titles. The Commons, located on the main floor of the library, has computers available for students and a digital media centre.

=== Fisheries and Marine Institute ===
The Marine Institute is a marine polytechnic institution located on Ridge Road in St. John's within Pippy Park, north of the city. It has facilities such as a full ship's bridge simulator and the world's largest flume tank. It offers degrees, diplomas, certifications and industry training for the maritime sector.

=== Grenfell Campus ===
Grenfell Campus is a 185-acre (75 ha) site in Corner Brook. It has approximately 1300 students, 156 faculty, and 235 staff and offers Arts, Fine Arts, Business, Science, and Nursing programs. It was formerly known as Sir Wilfred Grenfell College until 10 September 2010.

=== Harlow Campus ===
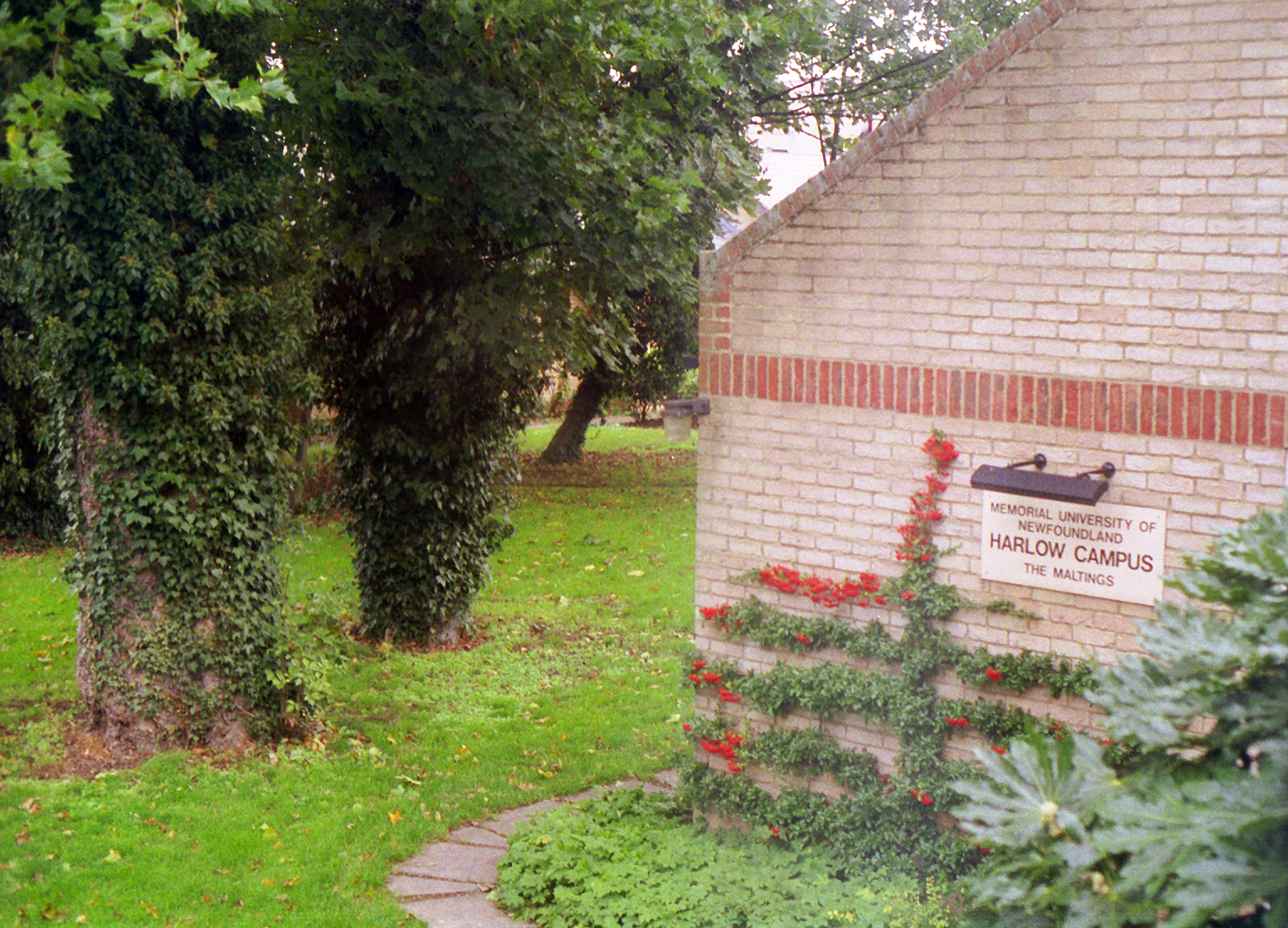
Harlow Campus of Memorial University

Harlow Campus is Memorial's only international campus, located in Old Harlow, Essex, England.

As of November 2023, Harlow Campus was operated by 16 staff members and could accommodate around 60 students. It consists of the Maltings and Cabot House; also having a former schoolhouse and a teacher's cottage, which have been converted into a lecture facility; as well as a former shop has been converted into apartments.

Harlow is not a school unto itself. Instead, professional schools and academic departments at Memorial use the Harlow Campus to deliver programs. Harlow offers courses in Biology, Business, Drama & Performance, English Cultural Landscape, Fine Arts (both Theatre and Visual Arts), Faith, Love & Lore, and History & Political Science. The university will close its Essex campus at the end of August 2026.

=== Labrador Campus ===
As a first step to campus status, the School of Arctic and Subarctic Studies (SASS) was founded within Labrador Institute (located at Happy Valley-Goose Bay) in July 2020, following a decision of the Memorial University Senate in September 2019. Afterwards, the Labrador Institute became Labrador Campus in 2022.

SASS currently offers several graduate programs in Arctic and Subarctic Futures (MASF), and as of April 2024 was planning to launch its first undergraduate degree - the BASIS (Bachelor of Arctic and Subarctic Interdisciplinary Studies) - to commence in September 2024.

=== Signal Hill Campus ===
In 2013, Memorial University purchased the former Battery Hotel, located on Signal Hill, overlooking St. John's harbour. The hotel was a landmark property with a long history in the province's cultural life.

Emera Innovation Exchange

Signal Hill Campus opened to the public in September 2018. A large portion of the campus, the Emera Innovation Exchange, serves as Memorial's innovation and public engagement hub to facilitate university-community collaboration. The campus houses public-facing university organizations, a large conference centre, and graduate student living accommodations. Tenants are the Harris Centre, Gardiner Centre, Genesis, Office of Public Engagement, Office of Strategic Operations (Signal Hill Campus) and Conference Services, MUN Pensioners' Association, Newfoundland Quarterly, and Business & Arts NL.

Conference Centre

The Conference Centre on Signal Hill Campus is a convening space within the Emera Innovation Exchange. It houses convening spaces, each with full AV connectivity. The Conference Hall overlooks St. John's harbour and can be divided into three separate venues or combined as one larger venue with the capacity to host up to 450 people. The Atrium, a multifunctional event space spread over two levels and connected by a seated staircase, serves as a venue for public events and presentations. YAFFLE Connect, a space operating as a physical manifestation of the Yaffle application, Memorial's online connecting tool, was designed for small meetings, co-working sessions, dialogues and debates. There are eight meeting rooms on the lower level of the Atrium and a dining room with a built-in kitchen for private lunches or small dinner receptions.

Accommodations

The Harbour Wing and Tower areas of Signal Hill Campus are dedicated to graduate student living accommodations. There are 87 furnished rooms available, each single occupancy with a private washroom. The kitchen and lounge facilities on each floor are common areas shared between about 15 students.

=== Botanical Garden ===
The collection includes perennial and annual plants, aquatic plants, spruce, fir, and alder trees. The garden, founded in 1972, is located at Oxen Pond along Mount Scio Road. The park has adopted the Twinflower (Linnaea borealis) as its emblem.

=== Frecker Institute in St. Pierre ===
The Frecker Program in the French territory of St. Pierre and Miquelon consists of French immersion for 2nd year university students, with five “level 2000” French courses. The teaching is provided by teachers from the university's modern languages, literature and culture department and from Francoforum. 3rd and 4th year students go to the Côte d'Azur University in Nice or the Southern Brittany University in Lorient, while 5th year students go to the University of Bordeaux. The institute, and later the program, were named in honour of the Canadian politician George Alain Frecker, who was born in Saint-Pierre and was formerly chancellor of Memorial University.

== Student body and campus life ==
There are over 18,000 students enrolled in full and part-time studies at Memorial University. This number includes both undergraduate and graduate students. As of fall 2023, approximately 62% of students are from Newfoundland and Labrador.

=== International students ===
As of November 2024, international students comprised 24.7 per cent of the student population at Memorial University. They are served by the Internationalization Office, which is a dedicated administrative unit of the University offering services such as immigration advising, social events, and off-campus housing, among others.

=== Campus housing ===
Student Residences provides on-campus housing at the St. John's campus in three residential complexes: Paton College, Macpherson College, and Burton's Pond Apartments. There is a dining hall for students in residence, R. Gushue Hall, serviced by Aramark. A meal plan is mandatory for students in Paton College and Macpherson College.

Paton College dormitories offer dormitory-style accommodations for approximately 1000 students in nine residences, called Houses, and named after persons associated with the university or Newfoundland and Labrador: Barnes, Blackall, Bowater, Burke, Curtis, Doyle, Hatcher, Rothermere, and Squires.

The newer Macpherson College consists of two halls: Shiwak and Cluett, which house 250 students each and were officially opened in 2013.

The five Courts of Burton's Pond apartments accommodate a total of 640 students (inclusive of any dependents) in four-bedroom apartments and provide a more independent lifestyle on campus. They are Baltimore, Cabot, Cartier, Gilbert, and Guy.

Formerly, there were three residential colleges operated by different Christian church denominations at St. John's Campus. Coughlan College was operated by the United Church of Canada, Queen's College by the Anglican Church of Canada, and St. John's College by the Roman Catholic Church. In the present day, none of the Colleges accept residents; they are now occupied by the University's academic and administrative units.

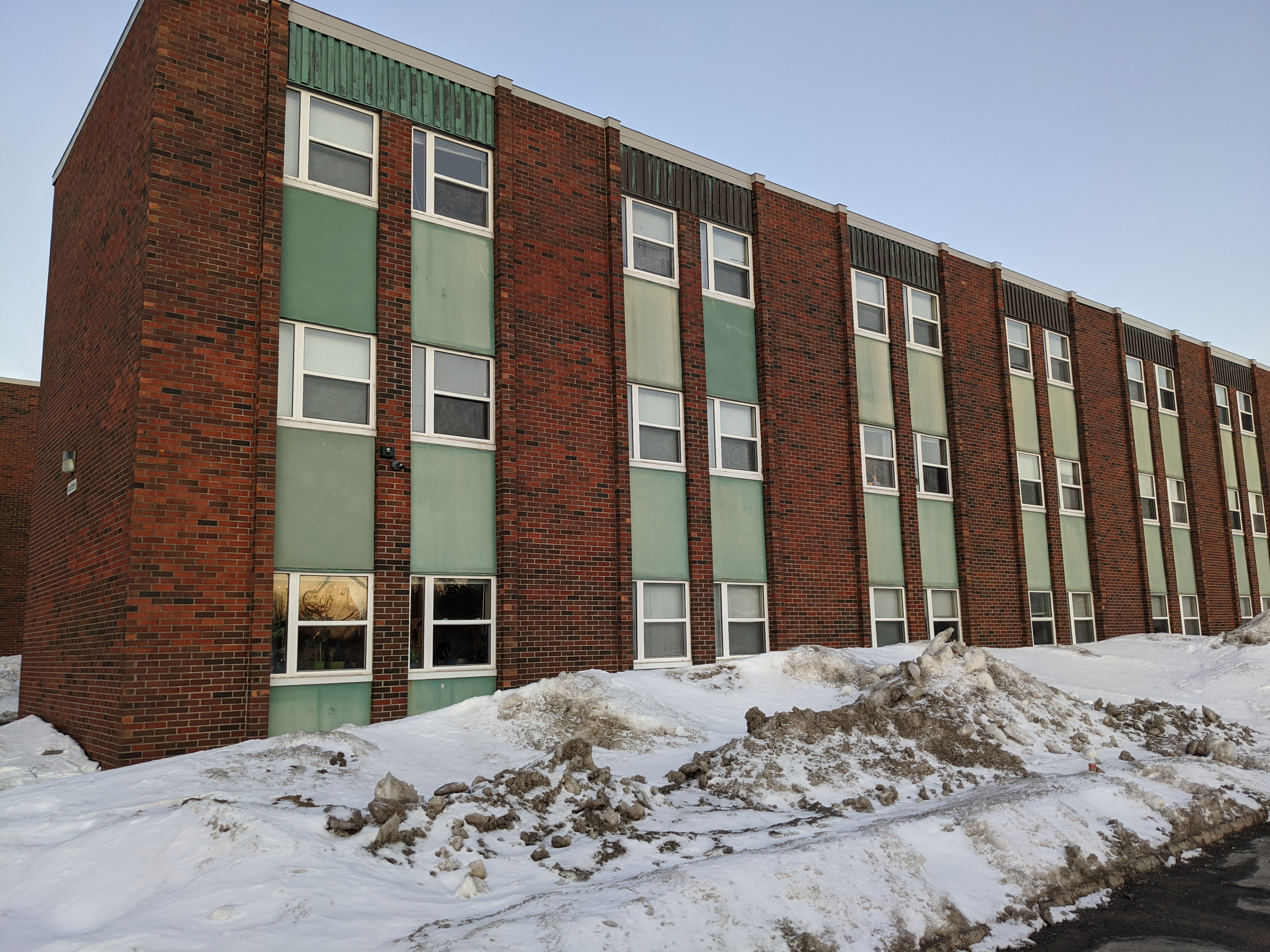
Burton's Pond.

Paton College and the R. Gushue Dining Hall.

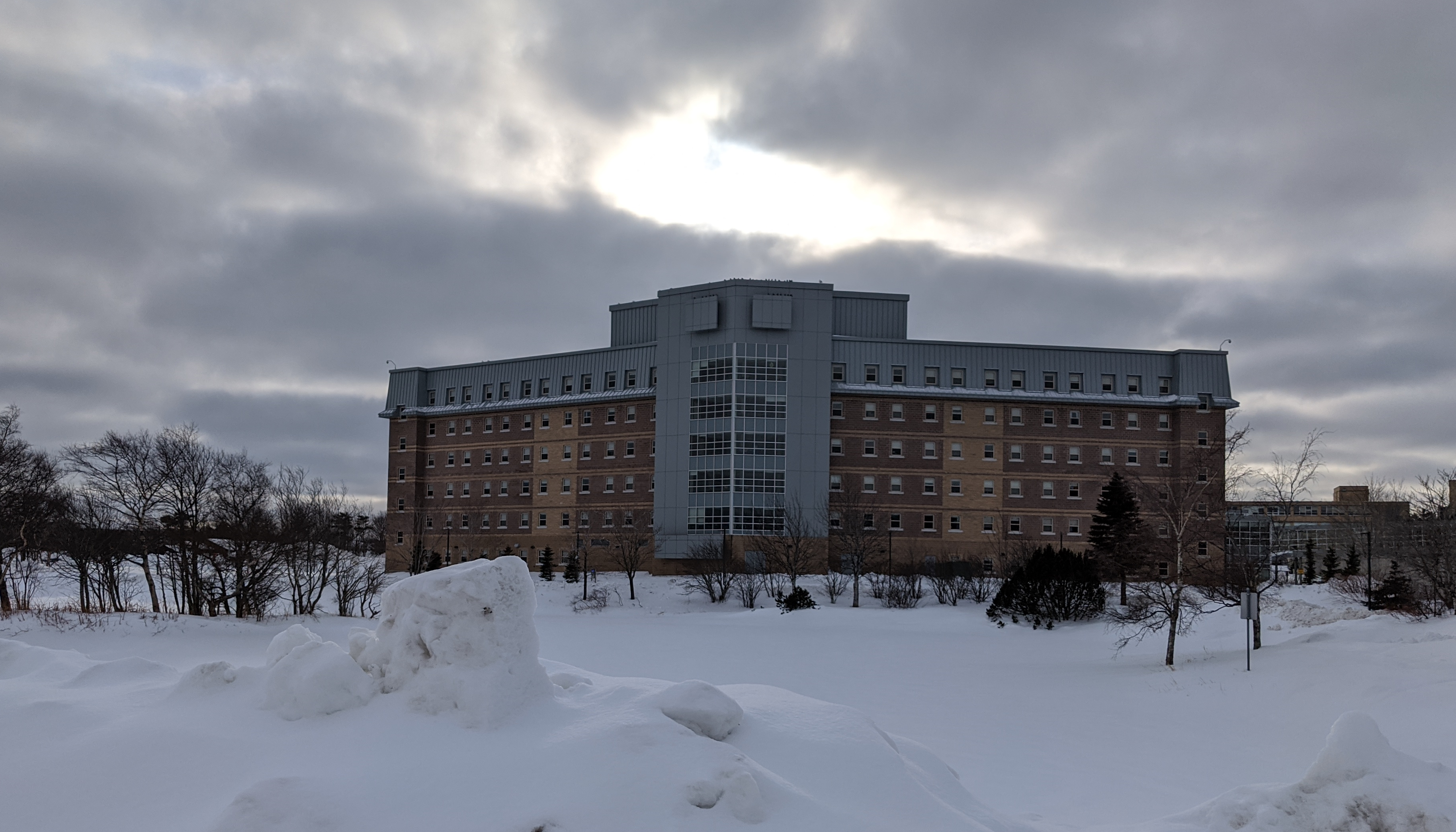
MacPherson College.

=== Sports, clubs, and traditions ===
Memorial's sports teams, the Memorial Sea-Hawks (formerly The Beothuks), are part of the Atlantic University Sport (AUS) league of U Sports. There are varsity teams in men's and women's basketball, cross-country, soccer, swimming, and women's volleyball. Curling, track and field and wrestling are available as club sports. The university has student media, including a radio station, CHMR-FM, and a newspaper, The Muse.

== Cultural impact ==
=== Postage stamp ===
On 1 January 1943, and again on 21 March 1946, 'Memorial University College' stamps were issued based on a design by Herman Herbert Schwartz. The 2¢ / 30¢ stamps were perforated 12 and were printed by the Canadian Bank Note Company, Limited.

=== Sponsors ===
Memorial University's Faculty of Engineering and Applied Science and Faculty of Science are major sponsors of Women in Science and Engineering Newfoundland and Labrador (WISE NL). MUN has supported WISE NL's Student Summer Employment Program, Indigenous Youth Initiatives, Professional Mentorship Program and the WinSETT Leadership Program - St. John's series.

=== Hudson & Rex ===
The Canadian crime comedy/drama series Hudson & Rex, based on the Austrian show Inspector Rex, is filmed at Memorial University regularly. The Bruneau Centre stands in for the headquarters of the fictional St. John's Police Department, while the rest of the campus has been used to portray the equally fictional Heritage University of Newfoundland and Labrador.

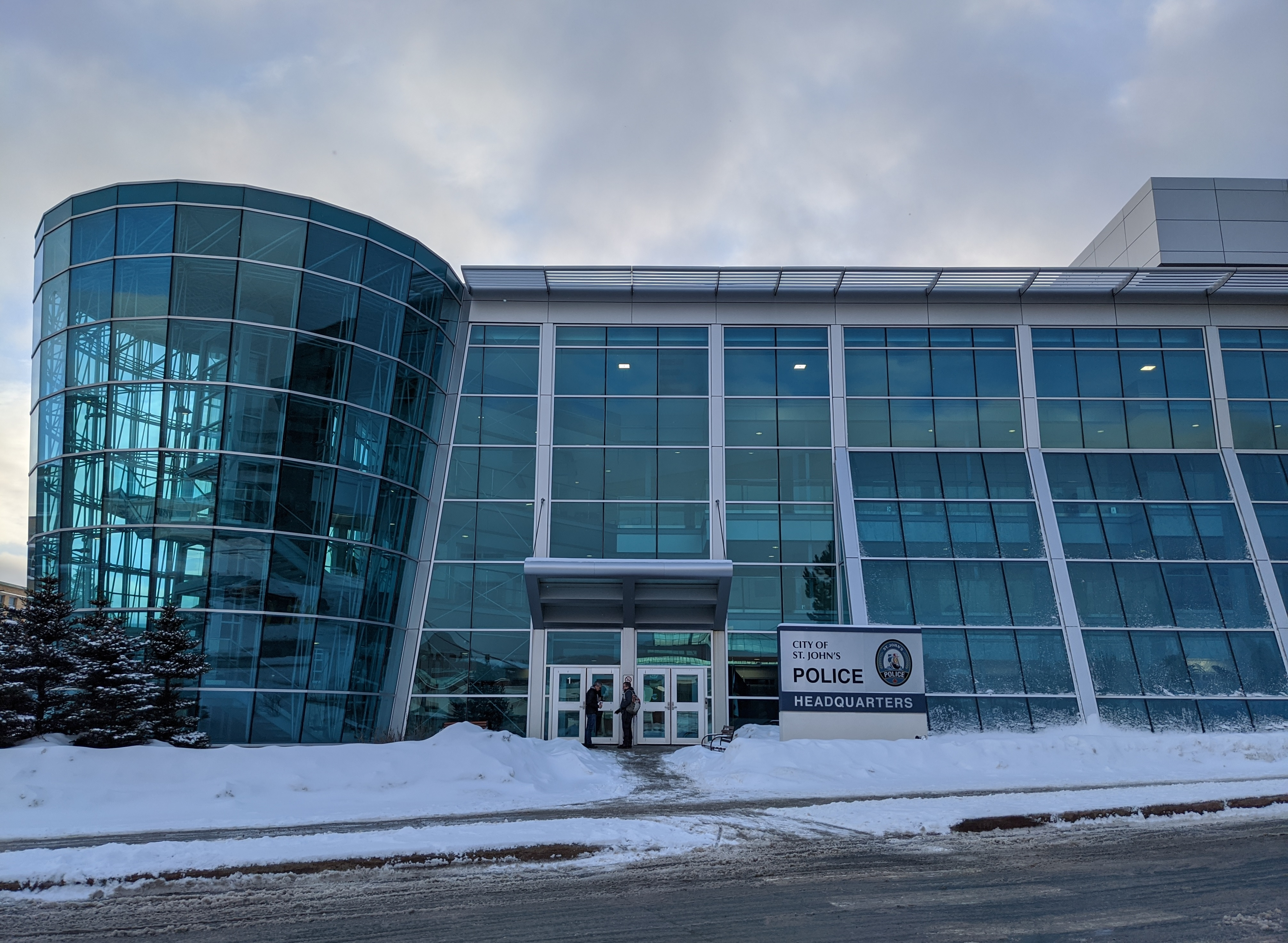
The Bruneau Centre, seen here standing in for the fictional St. John's Police Department

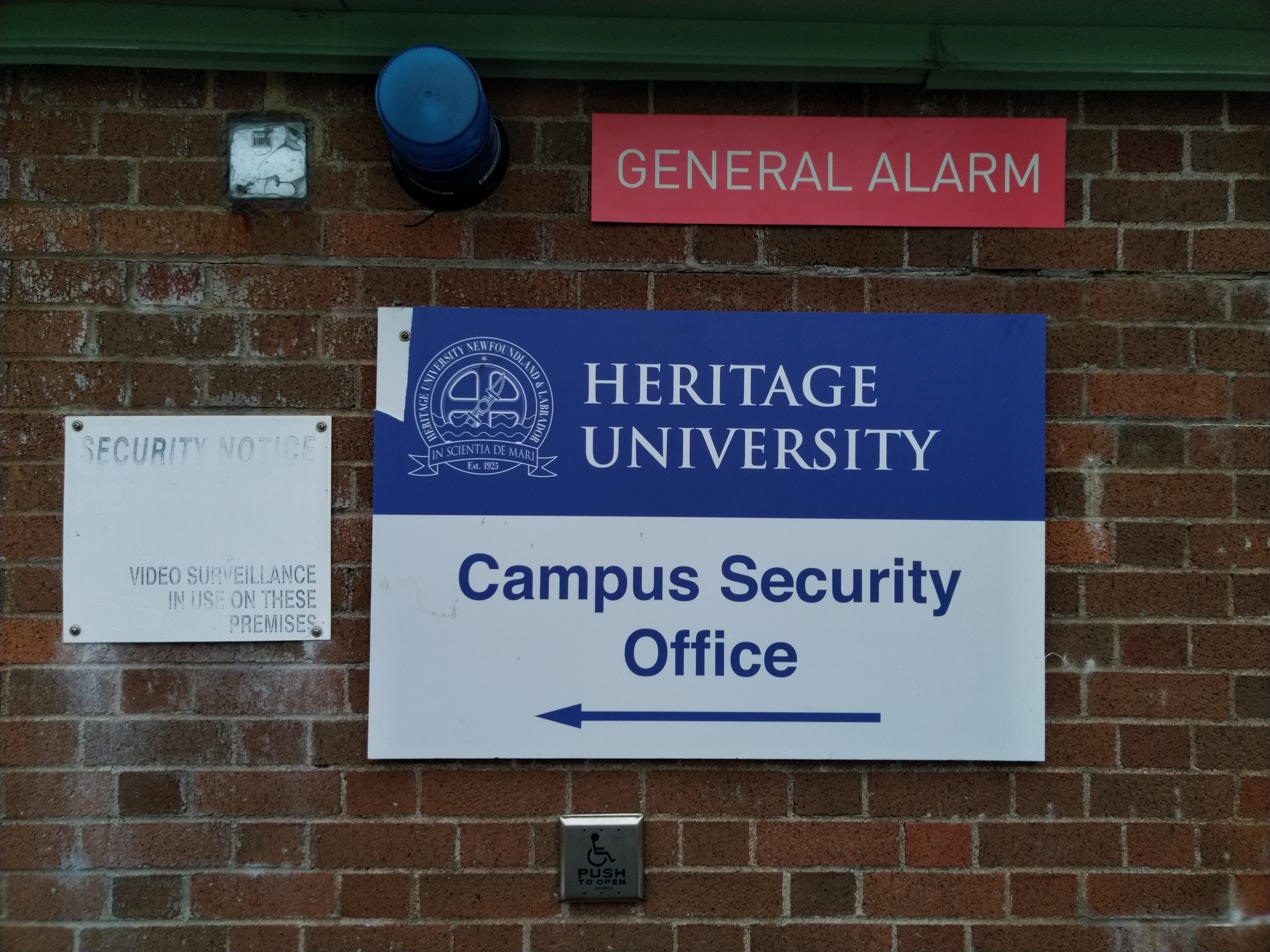
A sign for the fictional Heritage University

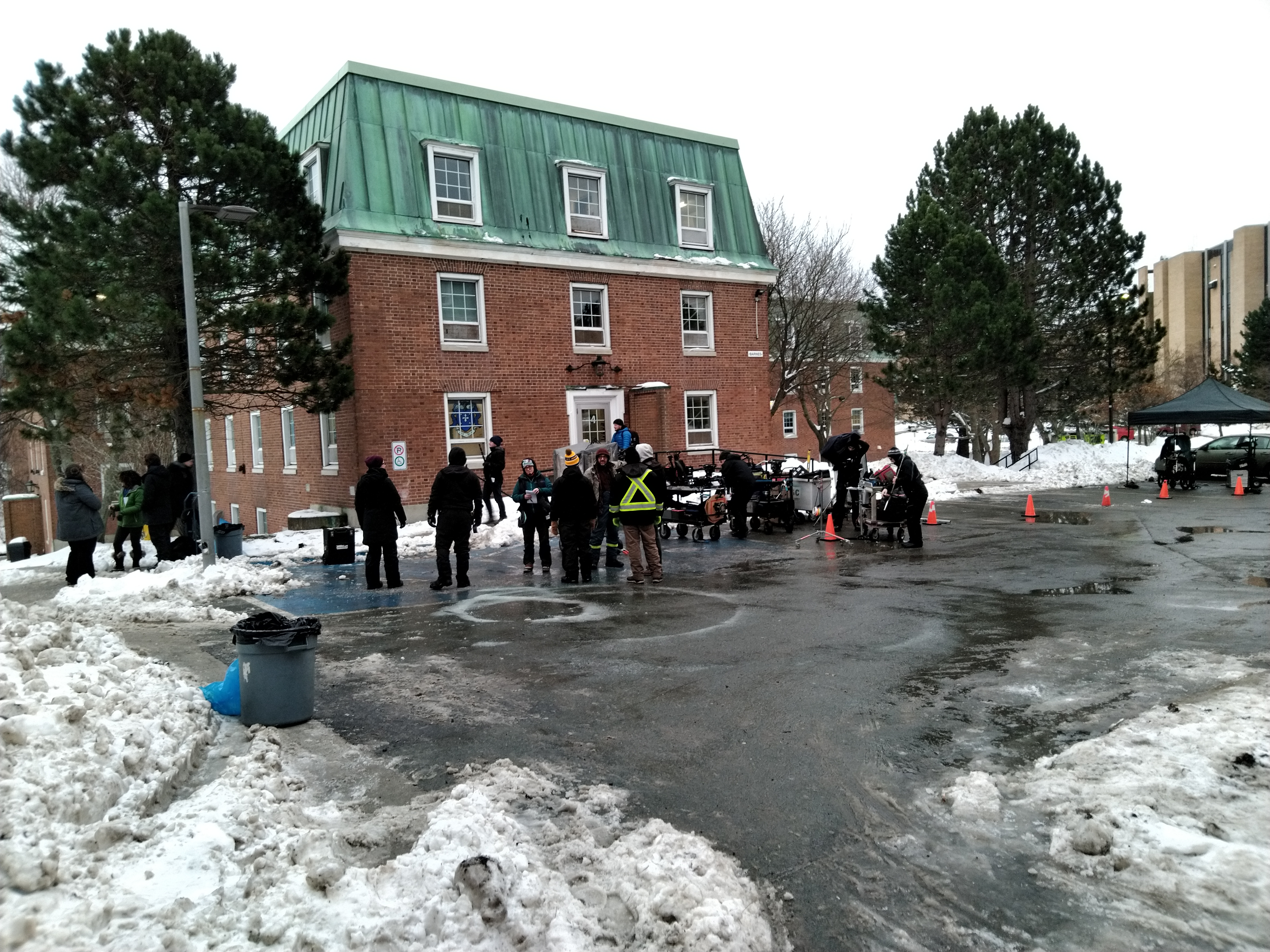
Filming at Paton College

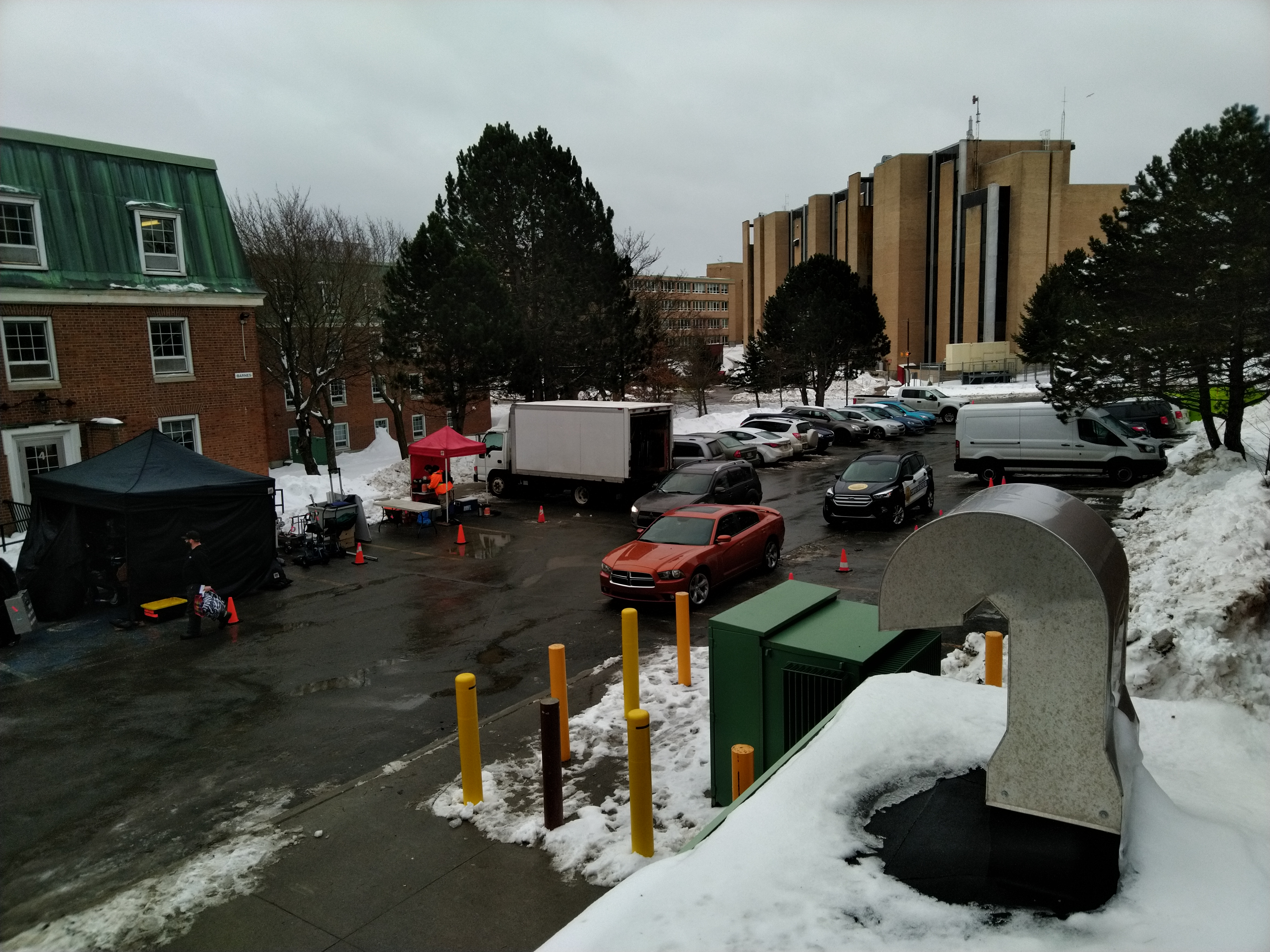
The orange muscle car belongs to protagonist Charlie Hudson, played by John Reardon

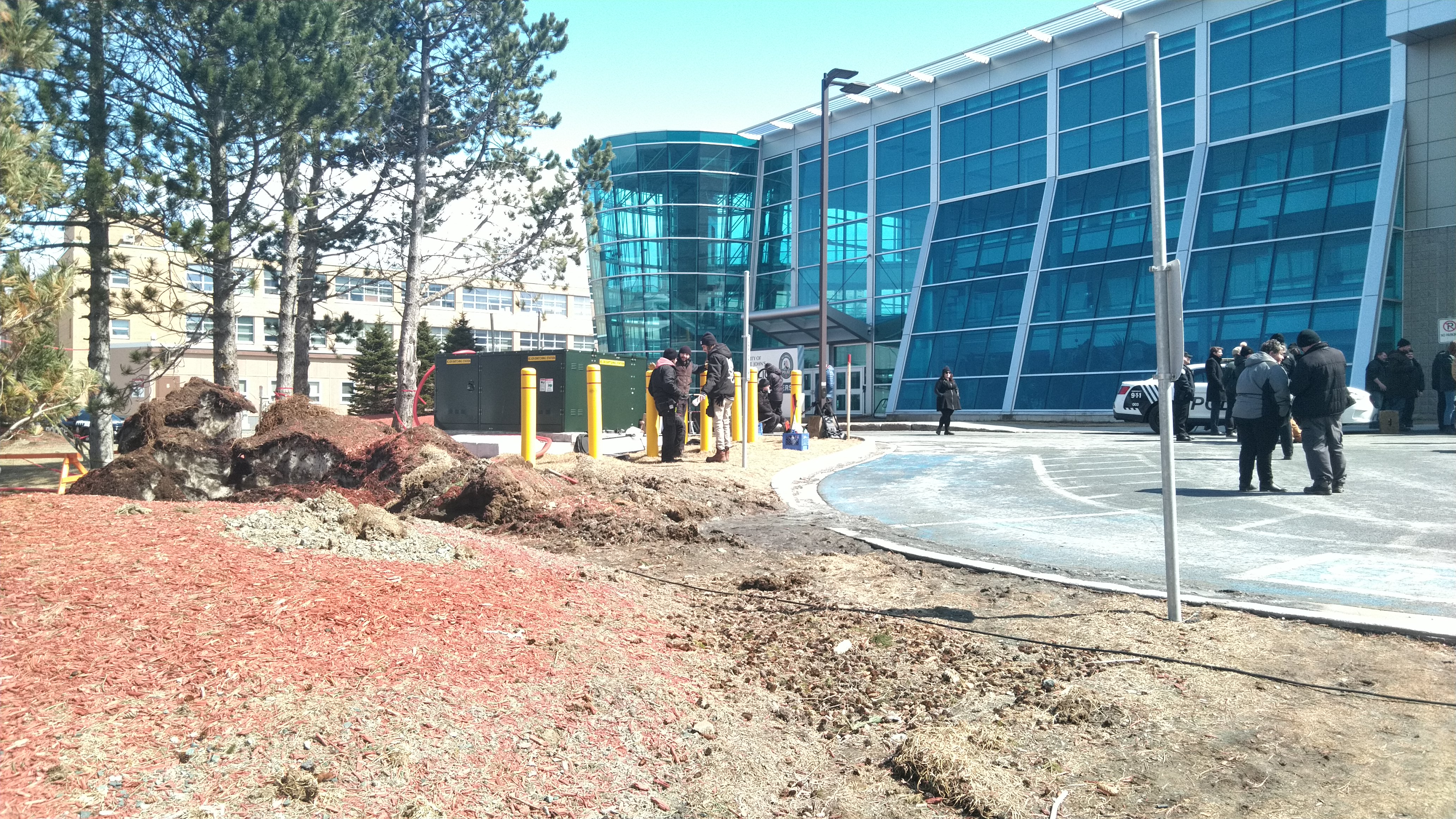
Filming at the Bruneau Centre

== Arms ==
Coat of arms of the Memorial University of Newfoundland
Notes Designed in 1949 by alumnus Robert Horwood Adopted 1951 Escutcheon Gules a Cross Moline Or between two bars gemel wavy Argent in chief three closed books bound of the last edged and clasped of the second. Motto Provehito in Altum (Launch into the deep)

== See also ==
- Canadian government scientific research organizations
- Canadian industrial research and development organizations
- Canadian Interuniversity Sport
- Canadian university scientific research organizations
- Higher education in Newfoundland and Labrador
- Memorial University of Newfoundland Students' Union
