= Grenfell Campus =

Campus of Canadian university

Coordinates: 48.94009°N 57.93220°W

Grenfell Campus, Memorial University of Newfoundland
- Motto: Provehito in Altum (Latin)
- Motto in English: Launch forth into the deep
- Type: Public
- Established: 1975
- Parent institution: Memorial University of Newfoundland
- President: Neil Bose pro tempore
- Vice-president: Ken Jacobsen pro tempore
- Academic staff: 156
- Administrative staff: ~235
- Undergraduates: 1,300
- Location: Corner Brook, NL, Canada
- Campus: Urban 185 acres (74.867 ha)
- Website: www.mun.ca/grenfellcampus/

Grenfell Campus, formerly Sir Wilfred Grenfell College, is a campus of the Memorial University of Newfoundland (MUN). It is located in the city of Corner Brook, Newfoundland and Labrador, Canada. The campus has approximately 1,300 students enrolled in degree programs for the arts, education, fine arts, science, resource management and nursing. Many students from around the province also attend the school for the first- and second-year course offerings before transferring to Memorial University's larger campus in St. John's.

== History ==
A view of the Grenfell campus in 2005. The location of this photograph is the site of the new Arts and Science Atrium.

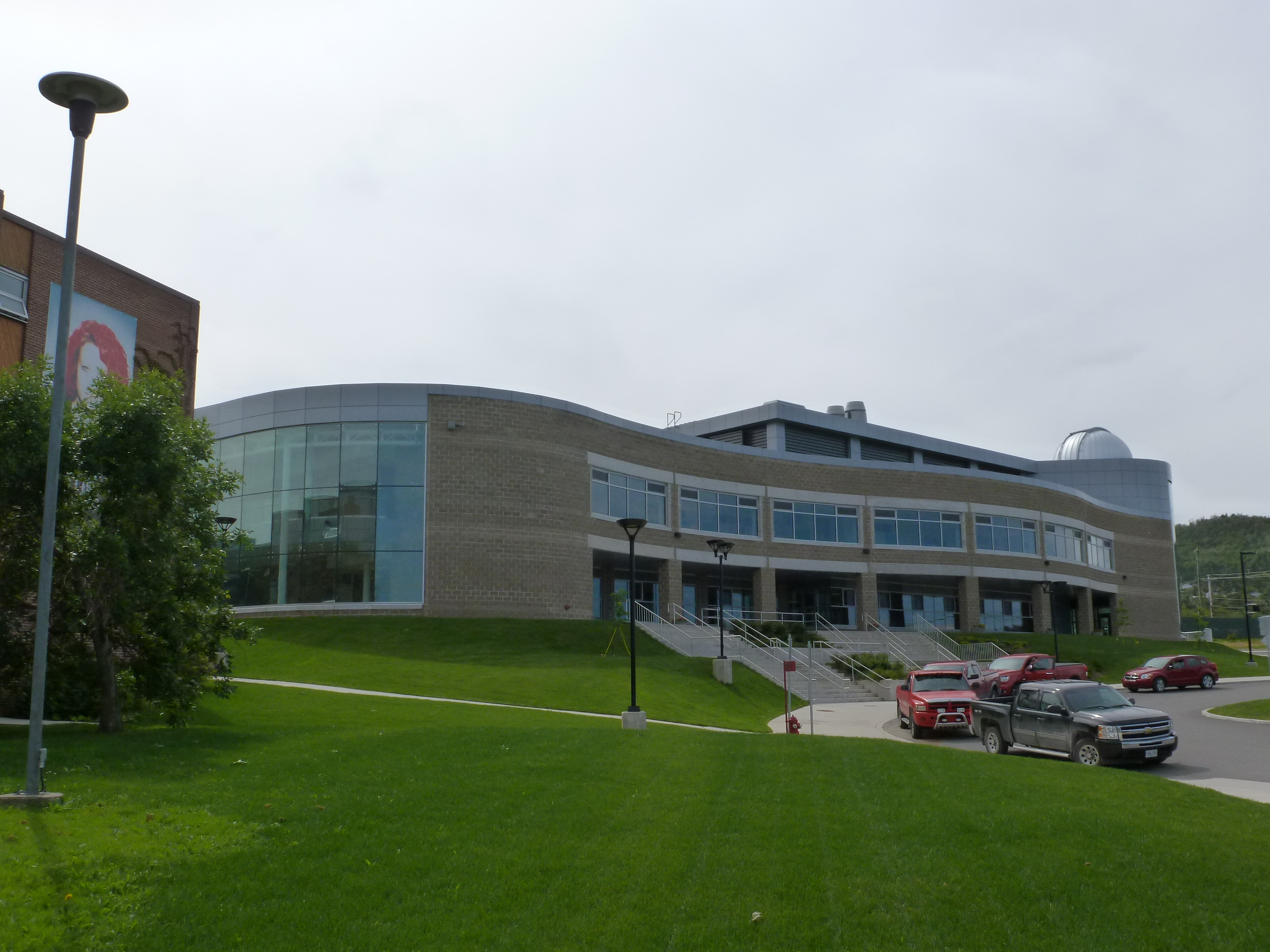
The newly constructed extension to the Arts and Science building, seen in August 2013.

The campus opened in 1975 as Memorial University's West Coast Regional College; Arthur Sullivan served as its first principal. It began with 400 students. The facility was renamed in 1979 in honour of British medical missionary pioneer Wilfred Grenfell. The original building is now known as the Arts and Science Building. In 1988, the campus' second building opened—the Fine Arts Building.

Grenfell Campus saw significant expansion in the 1990s and early 2000s, with new student housing and academic buildings constructed. In 1995, the Library and Computing Building opened, which housed the newly named Ferriss Hodgett Library; in 1997, the Student Centre annex was added to the Arts and Science Building. In 1998, the Forest Centre opened, which houses not only laboratory and classroom space, but also research offices for Natural Resources Canada, among others. In 2001, Grenfell opened its chalet apartments; the campus was then able to accommodate more than 400 students in student housing. In 2014, the new Residence Complex was officially opened, increasing student housing capacity to 600 students.

Grenfell Campus played a critical role in helping Corner Brook host the 1999 Canada Winter Games with its residences being used to house athletes. The city's "Canada Games Centre" civic centre opened in 1997, adjacent to the Grenfell campus. Previously run by Memorial University through Western Sports and Entertainment, today, it is known as the "Corner Brook Civic Centre," and is now run by Corner Brook City Council. On April 1, 2005, the college introduced a wireless local area network in areas of the campus which underwent major upgrades again in 2012.

In Newfoundland and Labrador's 2007 provincial budget, it was announced that Sir Wilfred Grenfell College would become an autonomous university within a single university system. In late 2009, the Government of Newfoundland and Labrador announced that Sir Wilfred Grenfell College would be undergoing several changes, including its own budget and a name change for the campus to include the 'Memorial University brand' and remove the 'College' appellation. However, the announcement fell short of offering the campus true status as a university (within the Memorial system), much to the anger and disappointment of many local residents.

On September 10, 2010, Sir Wilfred Grenfell College was renamed "Grenfell Campus, Memorial University of Newfoundland". The campus has since undergone a major facelift with the expansion of the Arts and Science building which includes additional science laboratories, a herbarium, digital media labs, and an astronomical observatory. On June 11, 2012, the campus unveiled its new logo to the public, which was rolled out in addition to a new marketing campaign entitled "Find Your Corner." New soil science laboratories, the Boreal Ecosystem Research facility, attached to the Forest Centre, also opened in Summer 2013. In 2016, Western Health closed the nursing school residence in the wake of the 2016 provincial budget. Monaghan Hall, located at Western Regional Memorial Hospital, had 69 rooms and closed that September.

Grenfell Campus introduced a decanal academic structure in 2016, replacing the previous college-style Department Head structure.

In June 2016, Princess Anne dedicated a sculpture of the Danger Tree marking the 100 year anniversary of the Battle of Beaumont-Hamel. In 2016, Prime Minister Justin Trudeau visited Grenfell Campus and planted a Forget-Me-Not at the Danger Tree site memorial.

== Degree programs ==
Memorial University, with the inclusion of the Grenfell Campus, is the only university in Newfoundland and Labrador. Grenfell Campus offers 18 undergraduate degree programs: Bachelor of Arts (English, Historical Studies, Humanities, Psychology, and Social/Cultural Studies), Bachelor of Business Administration, Bachelor of Education (Primary/Elementary Fast Track in Co-operation with St. John’s Campus), Bachelor of Environment and Sustainability (Environmental Studies and Resource Management), Bachelor of Fine Arts (Theatre (Acting and Stage Craft) and Visual Arts), Bachelor of Nursing (Accelerated and Collaborative), Bachelor of Science (Mathematics, Environmental Science (Biology and Chemistry), General Science, Physics, and Psychology). The Bachelor of Education (Primary/Elementary Fast Track) has been suspended and is currently under review.

In addition to the undergraduate programming, as of 2023, Grenfell Campus also offers Graduate programs in: Master of Arts (Environmental Policy, Applied Literary Arts, and Management), Master of Fine Arts (Visual Arts), and Master of Science (Boreal Ecosystems and Agricultural Sciences, and Applied Geomatics), PhD in Boreal Ecosystems and Agricultural Sciences, and PhD in Transdisciplinary Sustainability. In 2012, Grenfell Campus established its first graduate program with its Master of Arts in Environmental Policy. In 2015, the campus introduced the Master of Science in boreal ecosystems and agricultural sciences. More graduate programs are in development. Beyond the degree offerings, the campus also offers courses in a variety of other fields.

== Facility and features ==
Grenfell Campus consists of five main academic buildings the Arts and Science Building, Fine Arts Building, Library and Computing Building, Forest Centre, and Monaghan Hall located off-campus at the site of Western Memorial Regional Hospital home to the Faculty of Nursing. The original campus building, known as the Arts and Science Building, also contains the Student Centre Annex which hosts the students’ union offices, the campus dining hall The Grove, and the campus pub, The Backlot.

=== Observatory ===
The Arts and Science building extension contains the campus Observatory, the only professional telescope in Newfoundland and Labrador. The observatory regularly opens itself to the public for presentations and observation nights, frequently presented by Dr. Svetlana Barkanova, NSERC Chair for Inclusion in Science and Engineering. The facility also assists with the campus Physics program and research.

=== Residence ===
The campus also has on-campus accommodations for approximately 600 students spread across three residential areas. Residence Wings (Bennett and Pittman), two Chalet Sites (Site 1: Tuckamore, Spruce, Juniper, Jack Pine, Birch. Site 2: Gros Morne, Topsail, and Torngat), and the Residence Complex.

=== Aging Research Centre ===
The Aging Research Centre (ARC) is primarily located at Grenfell Campus; it also has spaces in St. John's, Grand Falls-Windsor, and North-West River. The office at Grenfell Campus provides space and equipment to conduct research, conduct interviews, and meet. The centre was created in response to the province not having such a facility and its rapidly ageing population, among the highest in Canada.

=== Boreal Ecosystem Research Facility ===
The Boreal Ecosystem Research Facility is located within the Forest Centre at Grenfell Campus. The Facility was established to promote "university and private sector research priorities in forestry, agriculture and the environmental sector". The facility also supports research activity for its Master of Science program

=== Environmental Policy Institute ===
The Environmental Policy Institute (EPI) was established at Grenfell Campus in tandem with its Master of Arts in Environmental Policy. The Centre engages in research, teaching, and public engagement

== See also ==
- Sir Wilfred Thomason Grenfell
- Al Pittman
- List of astronomical observatories in Canada
