= Raymond Gushue =

Canadian academic administrator

- Born: June 20, 1900; Whitbourne, Newfoundland
- Died: December 18, 1980 (aged 80)
- Title: President and Vice-Chancellor of Memorial University of Newfoundland
- Term: 1952 to 1966
- Predecessor: Albert Hatcher
- Successor: Moses Morgan

Raymond Gushue, OC, CBE, QC (June 20, 1900 – December 18, 1980) was a Canadian lawyer and academic administrator. He was the President and Vice-Chancellor of the Memorial University of Newfoundland from 1952 to 1966.

Born in Whitbourne, Newfoundland, he received a law degree from Dalhousie University in 1925. He practised law until he was appointed chairman of the Newfoundland Fisheries Board in 1936. From 1947 to 1958, he was chairman of the Newfoundland Woods Labour Board.

In 1967, he was made an Officer of the Order of Canada "for his contributions in the fields of education and public service".

Academic offices
Preceded by Albert Hatcher	President of Memorial University of Newfoundland; 1952–1966	Succeeded by Moses Morgan
