= Yiewsley =

Suburban town in the United Kingdom

Coordinates: 51.513°N 0.471°W

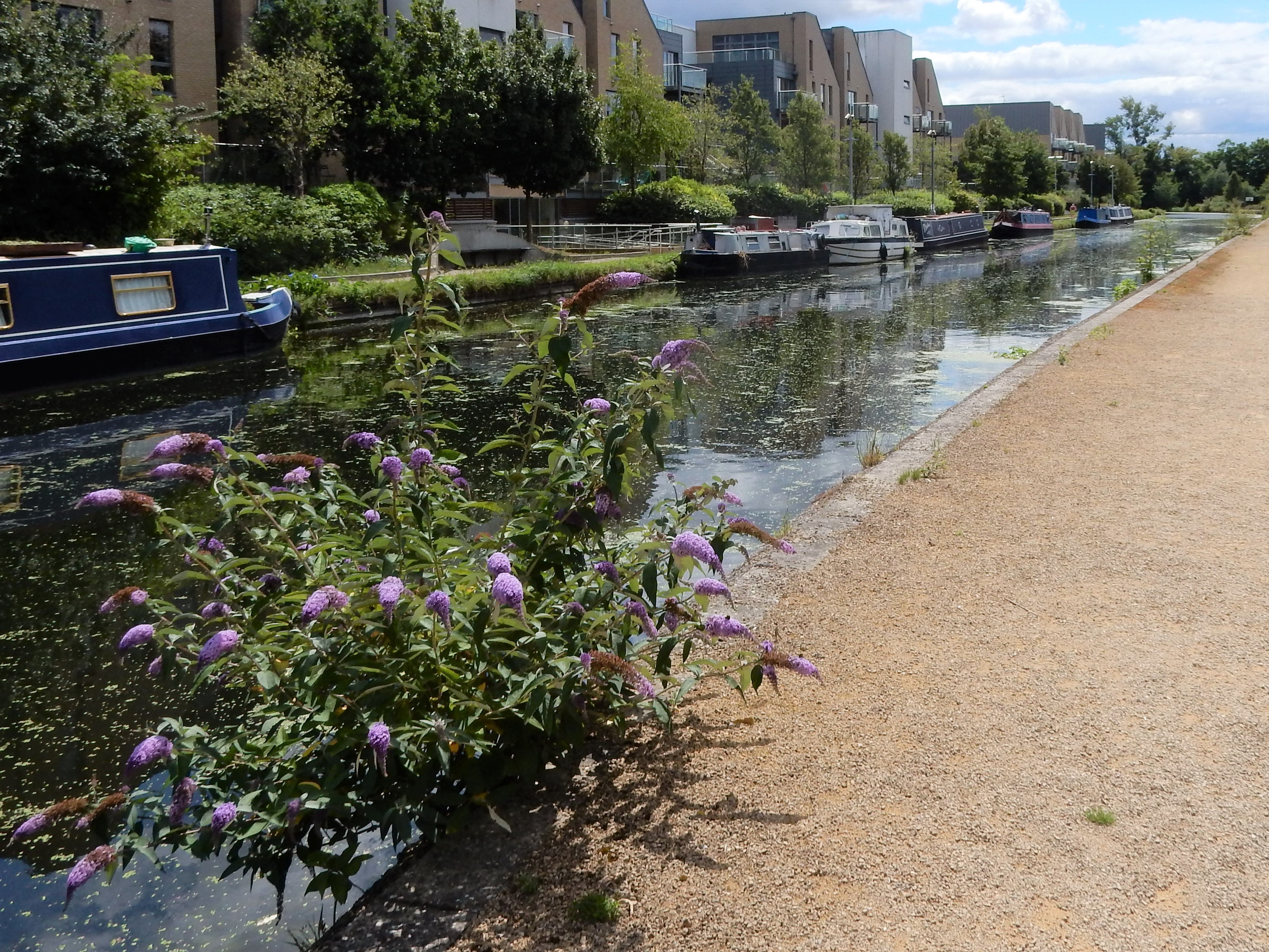
- The Grand Union Canal in Yiewsley

- Location within Greater London
- Population: 12,406 (Ward, 2021 Census)
- OS grid reference: TQ061804
  - Charing Cross: 17 mi (27 km) E
- London borough: Hillingdon
- Ceremonial county: Greater London
- Region: London
- Country: England
- Sovereign state: United Kingdom
- Post town: WEST DRAYTON
- Postcode district: UB7
- Dialling code: 01895
- Police: Metropolitan
- Fire: London
- Ambulance: London
- UK Parliament: Uxbridge and South Ruislip
- London Assembly: Ealing and Hillingdon

Yiewsley (/ˈjuːzli/ YOOZ-lee) is a small suburban town in the London Borough of Hillingdon, England, 2 miles (3.2 km) south of Uxbridge, the borough's commercial and administrative centre. Yiewsley was a chapelry in the ancient parish of Hillingdon, Middlesex. The population of the Yiewsley ward was 12,406 at the 2021 Census.

== Toponymy ==
Yiewsley is not recorded in the Domesday Book of 1086. The place-name is believed to be derived from the Anglo-Saxon Wifeleslēah: "Wifel's woodland clearing". The earliest written record of Yiewsley is from 1235, where it is shown as Wiuesleg in Assize Rolls.

Date	Form	Source
1235	Wiuesleg	Assize Rolls
1281	Wynesle	Abbreviatio Placitorum (Record Commission), London 1811 (Note: In view of the modern form, it seems likely that the "n" in some of the earlier forms should be read as "u" or "v".)
1383	Wyneslee	A Calendar to the Feet of Fines for London and Middlesex 1195–1485 (Note: P. 158: "Richard II Anno 6" = June 1382 – June 1383. "Wyneslee".) (Note: Gover shows 3rd letter as "v", while claiming A Calendar to the Feet of Fines as source, which shows "n".)
1406	Wyuesle	Calendar of the Close Rolls (Note: SEPN shows Wyvesle, but claims Close Rolls as source.)
1504, 1515	Wynesley	A Calendar to the Feet of Fines for London and Middlesex 1486–1569 (Note: (A) P. 13: "Henry VII, Hil. Anno 19" = early 1504. "Wynesley". (B) P. 21: "Henry VIII, Mich. Anno 7" = autumn 1515 (SEPN claims 1506; Gover claims 1516). "Wynesley". (C) Index p. xxxiv: "Wynsley", no middle "e".)
1593	Wewesley	Map of Middlesex 1593 by John Norden (Note: Gover claims 1596.)
1610	Wewrsley	Map of Middlesex 1610 by Jodocus Hondius I, John Norden, John Speed
1636	Wewesley	George Redford, The History of Uxbridge, 1818
1675	Wewesley	John Ogilby, Itinerarium Angliae, 1675
1769	Wewesley	Map of Middlesex 1769 by John Rocque (Note: 2nd "w" resembles a tailed "n".)
1809	Yewsley	Public Ledger and Daily Advertiser
1809	Yiewsley	The Day
1819	Yewsley	Map of Middlesex 1819 by Christopher Greenwood
1868	Yiewsley	Ordinance Survey Middlesex Sheet XIV Surveyed 1864.

Change from "Wewesley" to "Yewsley"

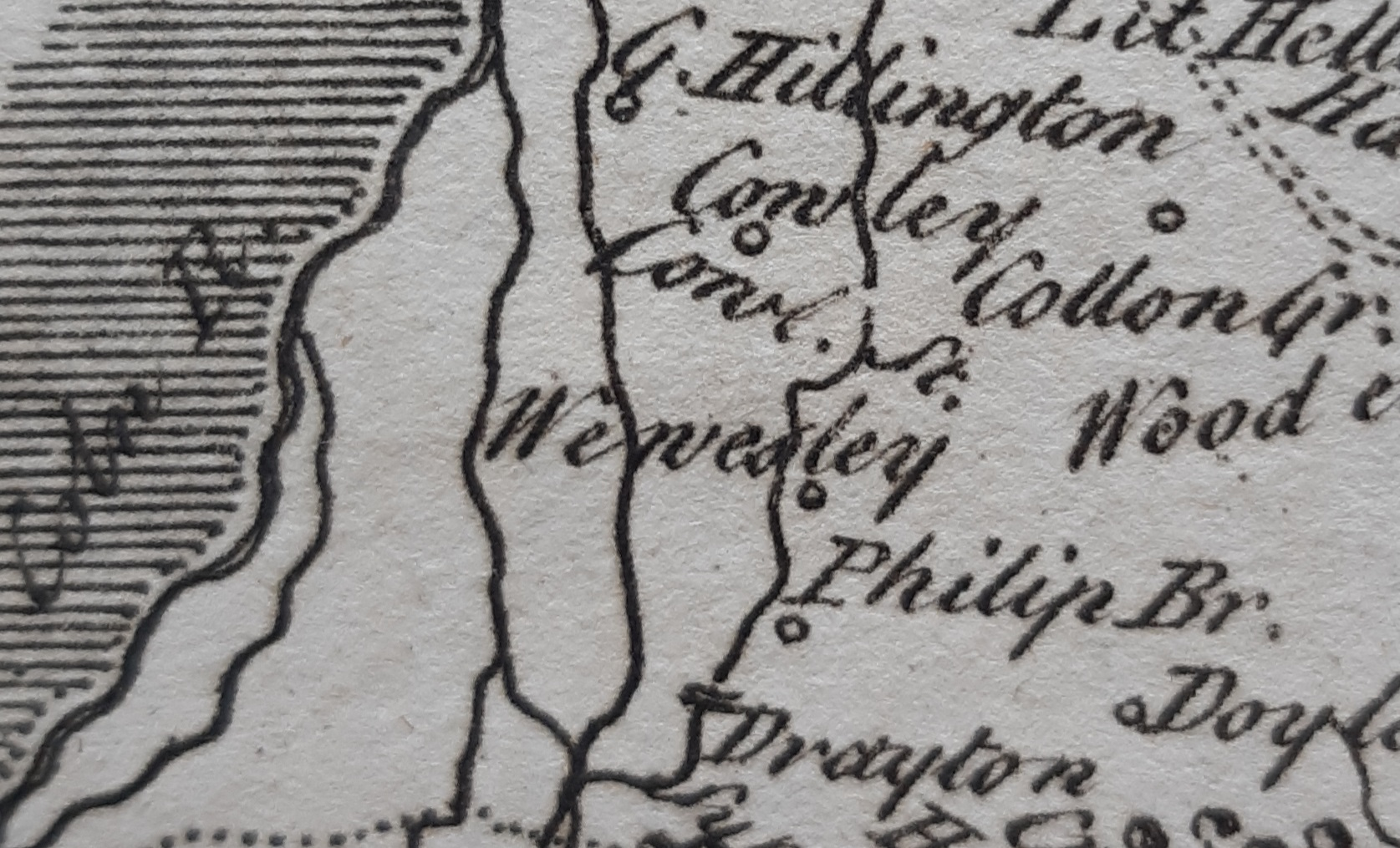
Wewesley (Yiewsley), Middlesex 1769, by John Rocque; 2nd "w" resembles a tailed "n"

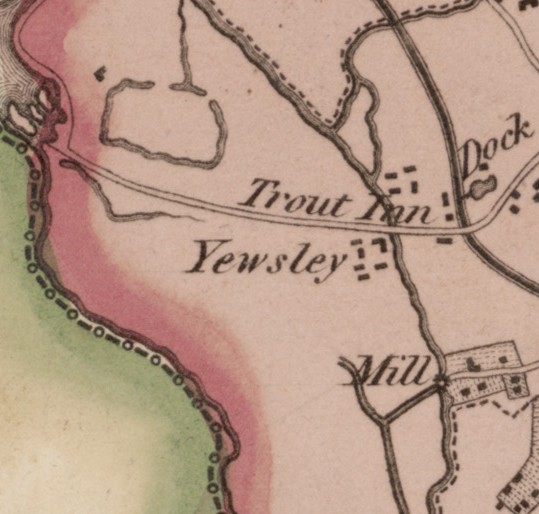
Yewsley (Yiewsley), Middlesex 1819, by C. Greenwood

In the 40 years between John Rocque's Map of Middlesex in 1769 and the 1809 newspaper advertisements in the Public Ledger and The Day there was a significant change in the spelling of the village from Wewesley to Yewsley or Yiewsley.

== Geography ==
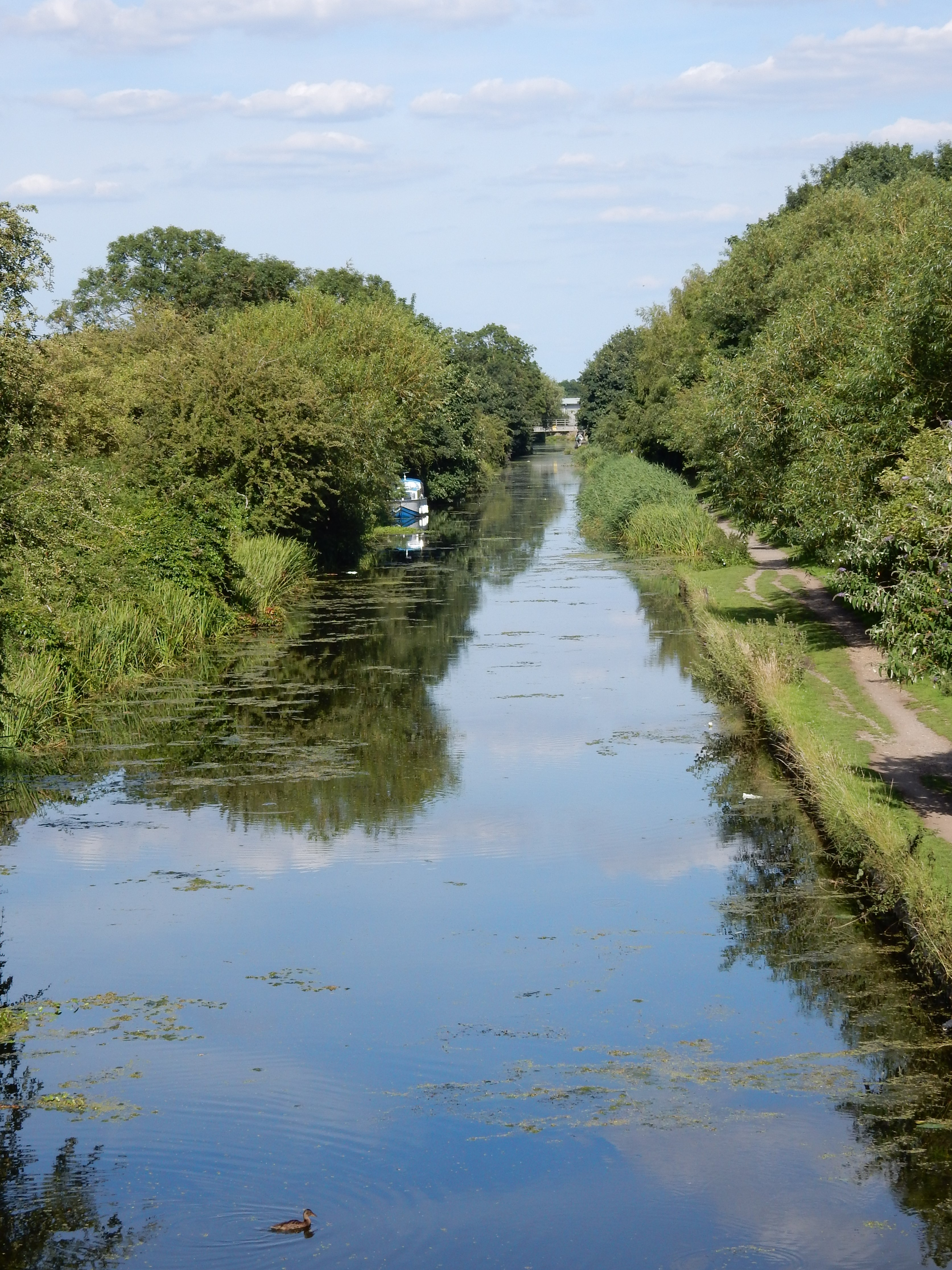
Grand Union Canal, Slough Arm, from Trout Lane Bridge

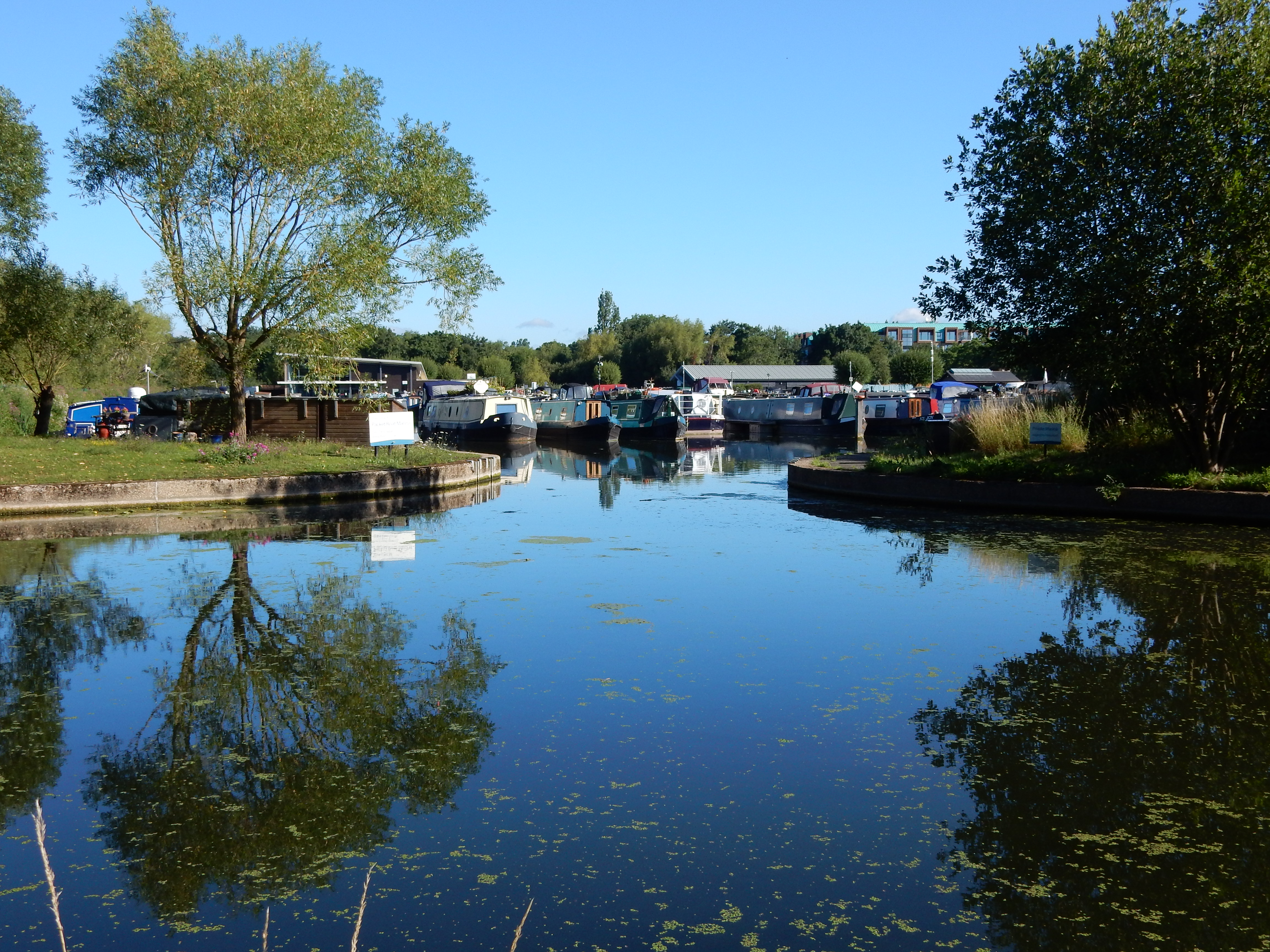
Packet Boat Marina at Cowley Peachey Junction

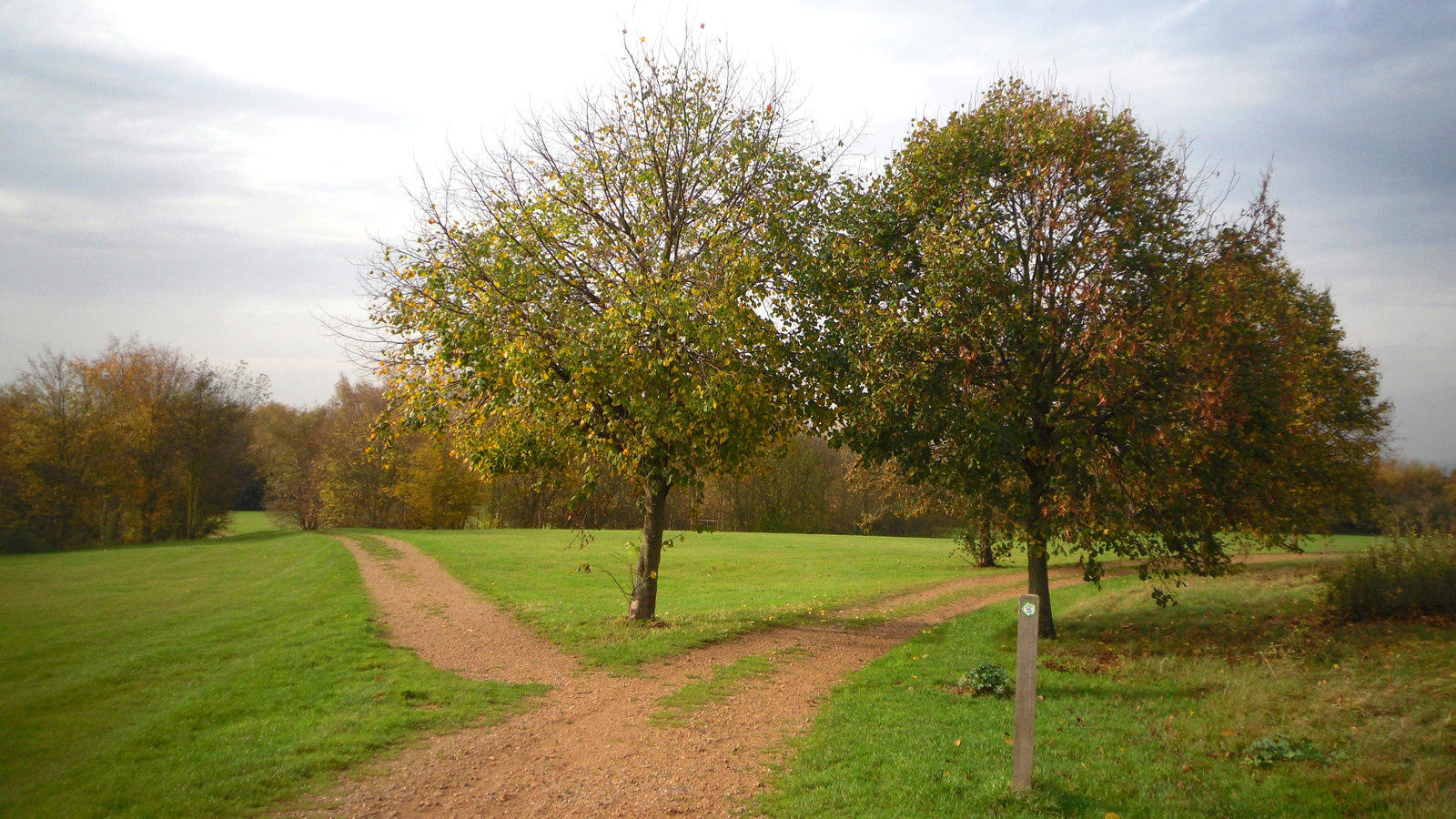
London Loop footpath, Stockley Country Park

The western side of Yiewsley lies within the Colne Valley Regional Park. Here the River Colne forms the county boundary between the London Borough of Hillingdon and Buckinghamshire. The confluence of the Frays River and River Pinn also occurs in this area, and there are several man-made lakes. After climbing south over the Chiltern Hills by the use of 52 locks from the Marsworth Junction, (Note: Numbers 39–45 uphill; 46–89 plus 69A downhill.) the Grand Union Canal turns east in Yiewsley to route towards London. Half a mile north of this turn, the five-mile Slough Arm of the canal leaves the Grand Union main line at the Cowley Peachey Junction, crossing over the Frays River and River Colne in aqueducts on its westward route towards the Slough basin. On the eastern side of Yiewsley lies Stockley Country Park; within its 274 acres (111 ha) of parkland lies a comprehensive network of footpaths.

To the west of Yiewsley, beyond the River Colne lie the Buckinghamshire villages of Iver, Richings Park and Thorney. To the north, over the River Pinn is Cowley Peachey. To the northeast of Yiewsley is Hillingdon and the villages of Colham Green and Goulds Green. To the east lies Stockley Park, and to the south, across the Great Western Railway, is West Drayton.

== Geology ==
Over tens of thousands of years, the course of the River Thames moved south, first flowing to the north of Yiewsley, then over the Yiewsley area, before reaching its present course, where it lies 4.8 miles (7.7 km) to the southwest of Yiewsley at its closest point. Over thousands of years, the Ancestral Thames deposited layers of fluvial terrace gravels, silts, sands and loams on the Middle Thames area, with silts forming brickearth.

== History ==
=== Stone Age ===
==== Lower and Middle Palaeolithic ====
Within the brickearth and gravels deposited by the Thames, significant quantities of early human tools were found when commercial excavations began in Yiewsley on an industrial scale in the 19th century. The first person to start collecting artifacts from Yiewsley was John Allen Brown (1833–1903), a Fellow of the Geological Society, who collected from 1889–1901. The principal collector was Robert Garraway Rice (1852–1933), a Fellow of the Society of Antiquaries, who recorded over 2600 items from the Yiewsley area from about 1905–1929. In 1937 his collection of Lower Palaeolithic and Middle Palaeolithic artifacts was donated to the London Museum.

In his 1978 Archaeological Report, Early Man in West Middlesex: The Yiewsley Palaeolithic sites, palaeontologist Desmond Collins states the following with regard to the archaeological significance of the Yiewsley sites:

...the Yiewsley pits have yielded one of the largest series of Lower Palaeolithic stone [hand] tools in Europe, and the area remains one of the richest Palaeolithic sites in Britain. ... A feature unique to Yiewsley is the presence in a higher level of stone tools of a Middle Palaeolithic (Mousterian) date, isolated here for the first time, and indicating occupation during the Neanderthal period some 70,000 years ago – a period of man's development otherwise poorly represented in the archaeology of Britain.

=== Bronze Age ===
In 1913–1914, a Bronze Age urnfield cemetery was discovered, with the excavation of 14 Deverel–Rimbury cinerary urns. These and other Bronze Age items, mostly from Boyer's Gravel Pit, have been catalogued at the British Museum.

=== Anglo-Saxon and Viking Age ===
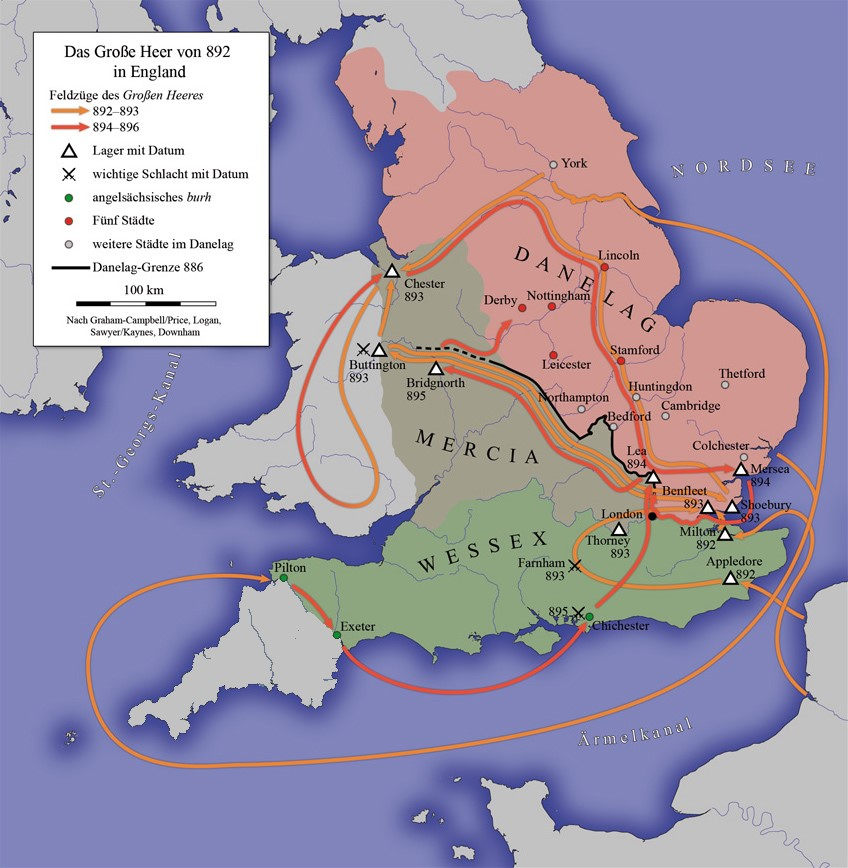
Map in German showing the 893 Battle of Farnham and siege of Thorney Island

==== Besieged Danes of Thorney Island 893 AD ====
In the spring of 893, after overwintering at Appledore in Kent, and then plundering through Kent and Sussex, a Viking raiding army turned to head for the Danish-controlled lands in the east (later known as the Danelaw). However, they were intercepted by Alfred the Great's son Edward with his West Saxon Fyrd at Farnham in Surrey. The Danes were routed, fleeing over the River Thames into Mercia, with the West Saxon army in pursuit. Having reached the River Colne, the Danes mounted a defence on what was known as Thorney Island, believed to be land between the Colne and an offshoot channel of the river between Thorney and Iver, approximately half a mile west from Yiewsley High Street today. Edward began a siege of the island, and was joined by Æthelred of Mercia with soldiers from the Mercian garrison in London. After a prolonged stalemate which may have lasted up to six months, an agreement was reached for the Danes to leave peacefully. Hostages were taken as collateral, and vows made by the Danes that they would leave the Anglo-Saxon lands and go directly to the lands under Danish control, which they duly did, without any of their plundered spoils.

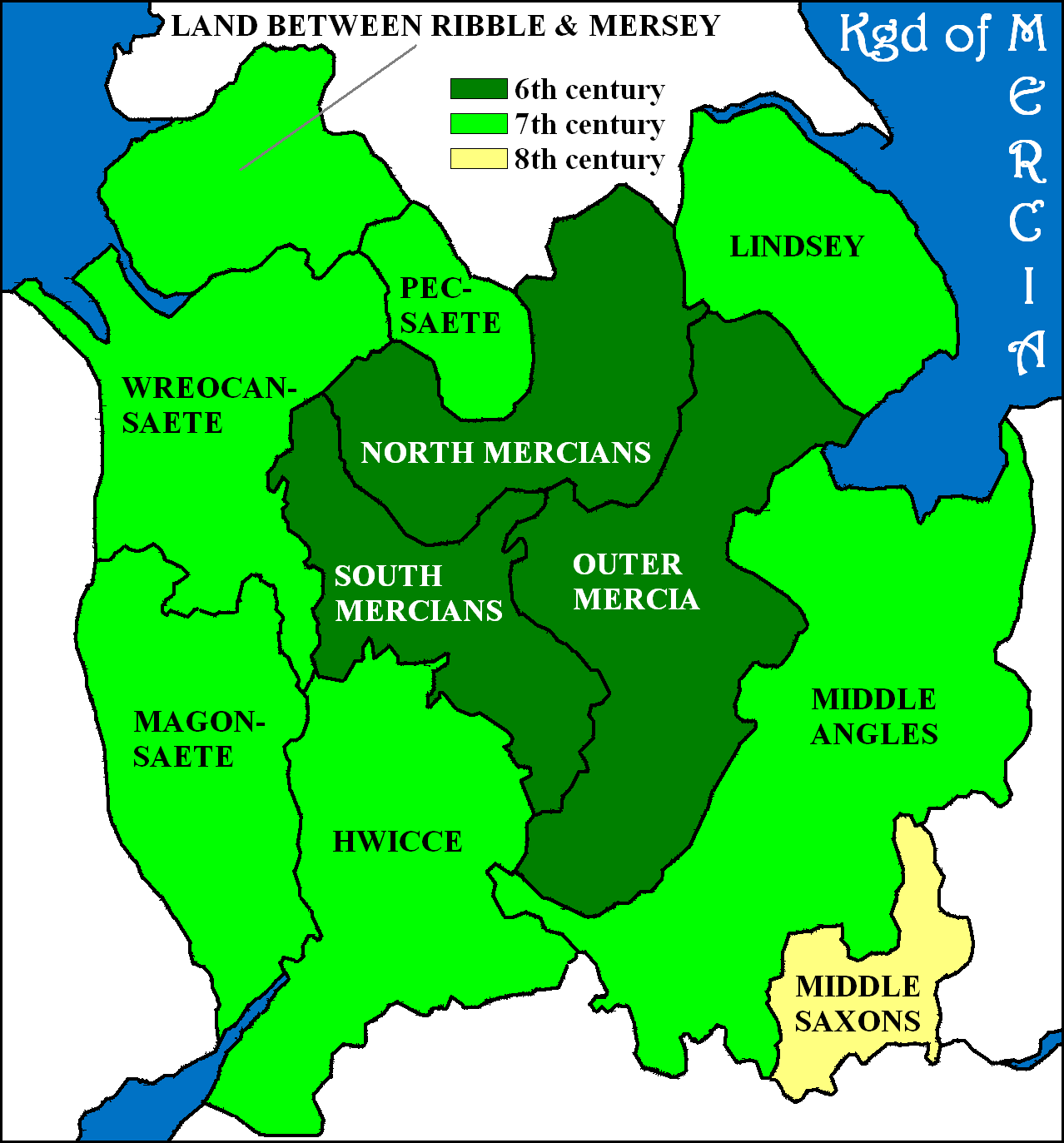
Land of the Middle Saxons within Mercia

Yiewsley (or Wifeleslēah) and the land of the Middle Saxons had been part of the Kingdom of Essex, but came under Mercian control in the reign of King Æthelbald (716–757 AD). By the time of the siege of Thorney Island in 893, eastern Mercia had been conquered by the Danes, and, with his power diminished, Æthelred had been forced to cede overlordship to King Alfred the Great of Wessex. When Æthelred died in 911, Middlesex was annexed by Wessex under Alfred's son, now King Edward (899–924 AD). Edward would go on to take control of all of Mercia, both Angle and Danish, advancing England's progression in becoming a single kingdom.

=== Norman Conquest 1066 until 1794 ===
==== Parish of Hillingdon and Colham Manor ====
For most of its existence, Yiewsley was a hamlet in the Parish of St John the Baptist Church, Hillingdon, with a tenurial relationship with Colham Manor. Before the Norman Conquest, Colham Manor had belonged to Wigot of Wallingford. By the time of Domesday Book in 1086, it was the property of one of William the Conqueror's principal advisors, Roger de Montgomery.

In Colham Manor's fertile arable fields in the late 14th century, wheat was the predominant crop, but rye and oats were also farmed. Surplus grain was sold in London or Uxbridge. By the 12th century, Uxbridge had become the market town for the Parish of Hillingdon, and it is thought that, by the 14th century, the town's population had exceeded that of the rest of the parish, and this remained the case until the 1821 census. By 1600 Uxbridge was the principal corn market for west Middlesex and much of south Buckinghamshire.

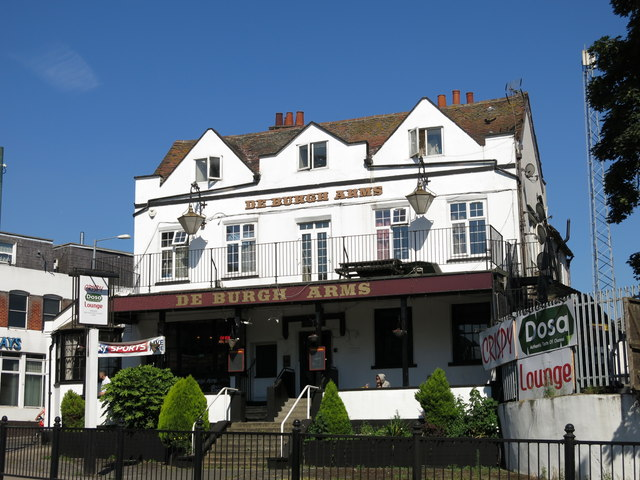
De Burgh Arms, High Street

The plentiful and consistent supplies of water from the River Colne had played an important role in Hillingdon Parish becoming a flour milling centre. The Fray's or Frays River is believed to have been cut or modified from the Colne for the use of water mills by John Fray in the 15th century. A map of 1842 shows the River Colne and Frays River powering eight corn mills in the parish. The nearest mills to Yiewsley were Colham Mill (called Lower Colham Mill from around 1746) in the south of the parish, and Yiewsley Mill on the northern side of Yiewsley Moor on the north side of today's Little Britain Lake.

The three oldest buildings in Yiewsley today date from the late 16th or early 17th century and are situated at either end of Yiewsley High Street. All three buildings are Grade II listed. At the northern end is Yiewsley Grange (also known as Brookside), which overlooks the River Pinn, and is Yiewsley Grange Primary School today. Next to Yiewsley Grange is the 6-bay barn in Philpots Close (formally within Philpot's farm). At the southern end is the De Burgh Arms public house, named in honour of the De Burgh family who became the Lords of Colham Manor from 1787.

=== Industrial Age ===
==== Opening of the Grand Junction Canal 1794 ====
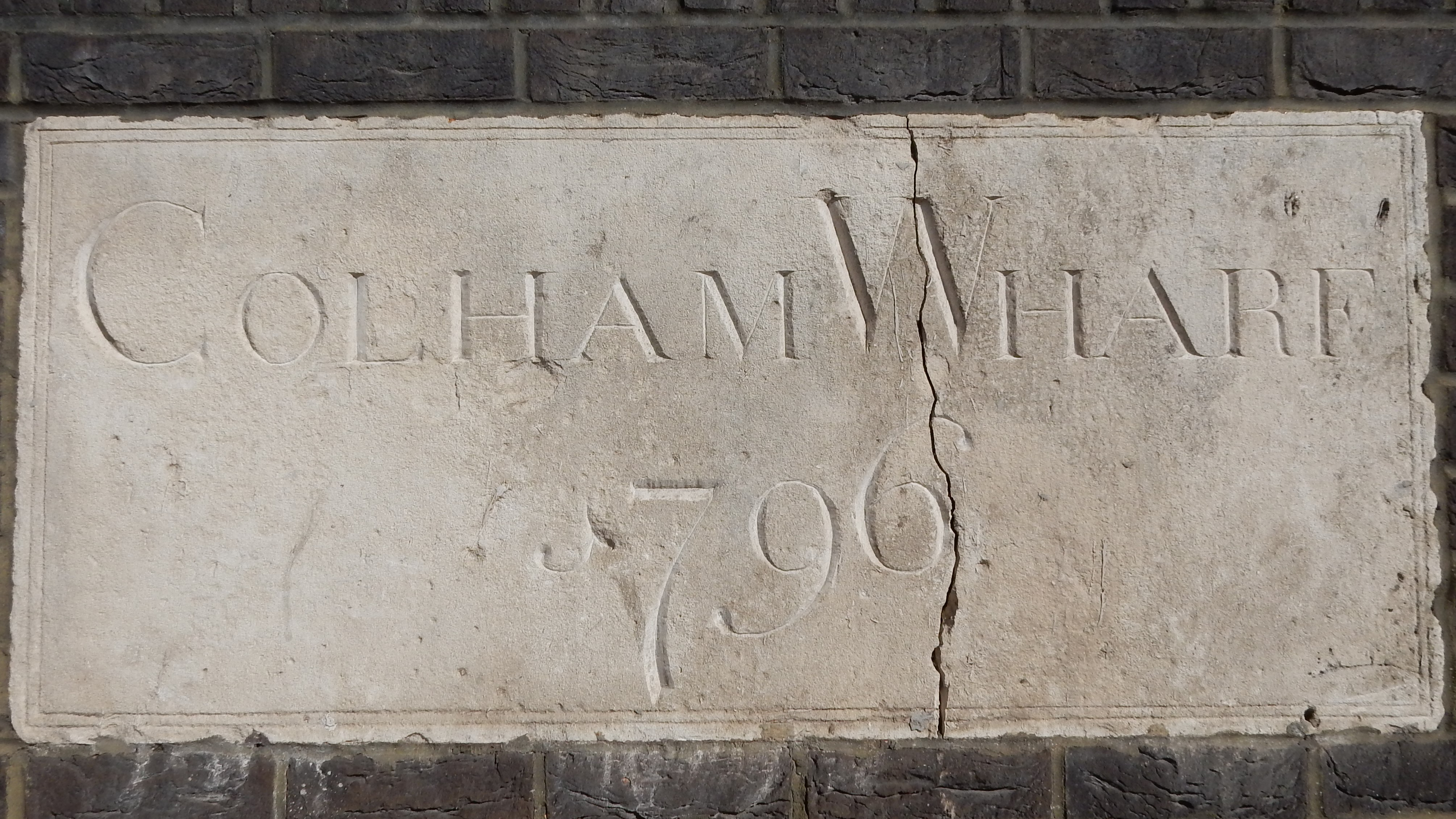
The foundation stone of Colham Wharf incorporated in the wall of Waterways House, High Street

Yiewsley's agrarian way of life started to change with the opening of the Grand Junction Canal. Construction began with cuttings on Uxbridge Moor on 1 May 1793, and in early May at Brentford and Braunston. From the Thames at Brentford to Hanwell, the canal was engineered from the River Brent. At Hanwell the canal parted from the Brent and was routed west, following the natural 100 foot contour to avoid the building of expensive and time consuming locks. It was cut through Yiewsley, turning north to follow the route of the River Colne, crossing over the Frays River in an aqueduct at Cowley Lock.

On 3 November 1794, the canal was opened between the River Thames and Uxbridge. However, toll collectors weren't appointed at Uxbridge and Brentford until May 1795. It is likely the aqueduct over the Frays River at Cowley Lock wasn't completed until the autumn of 1795, with measures undertaken there to allow traffic to pass through. In the next year, 1796, Yiewsley's first dock, Colham Wharf, was opened next to Colham Bridge. In 1801 the Paddington Arm of the canal opened from Bulls Bridge near Hayes, and would be of national importance as a trade route into and from the capital.

==== Brick industry ====
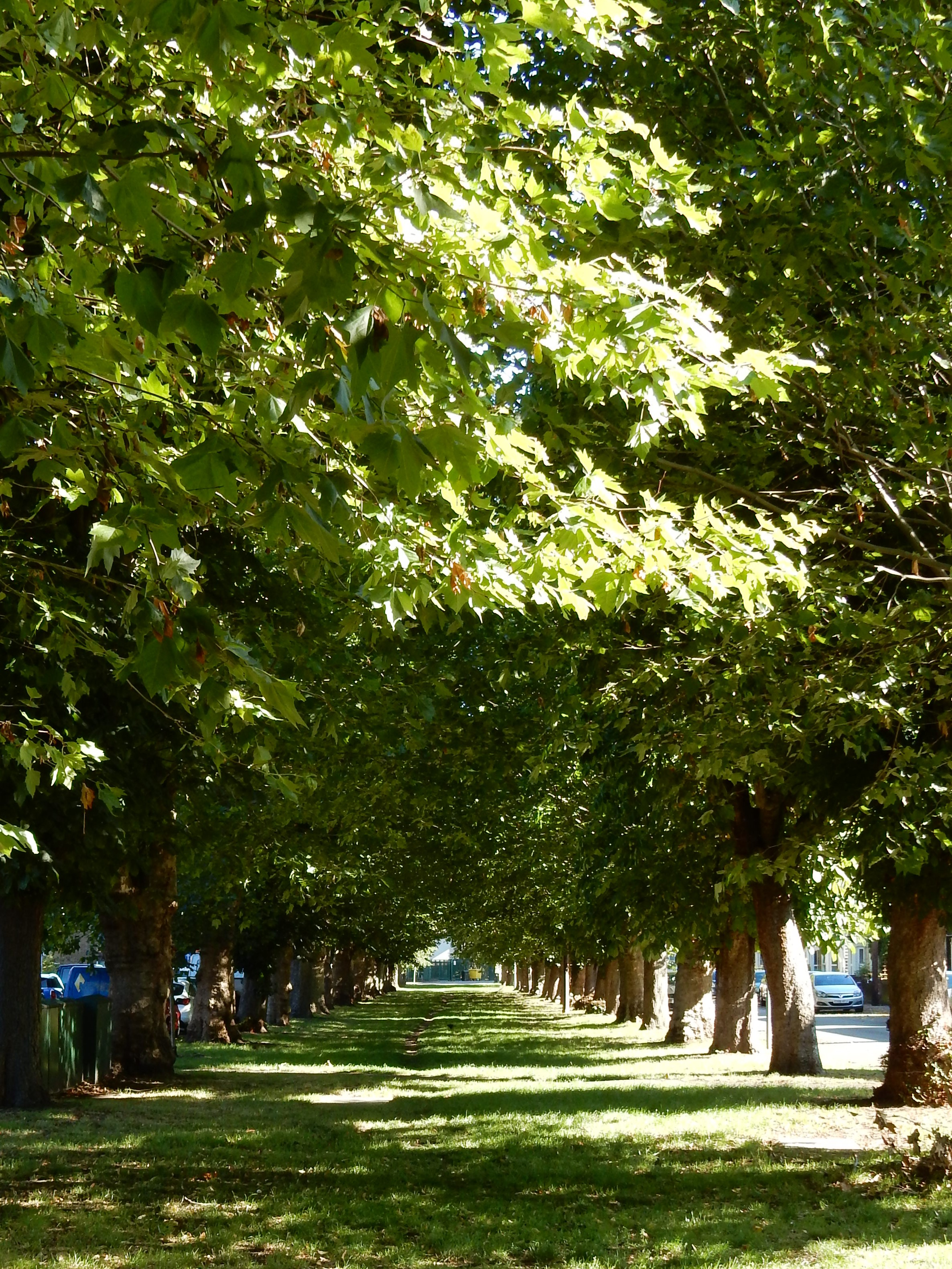
Trees line Royal Avenue, formerly part of the southern section of the Otter Dock

The building of the canal enabled the bulk transportation of bricks made from Yiewsley's rich deposits of brickearth. The first record of brick making in Yiewsley was by William Pope in Chauntry Close (Now Chantry Close). An advertisement in the Public Ledger and Daily Advertiser of 24 March 1809, announced an auction of over a million of his bricks. By May 1809 William Pope had passed away and the brickfield was offered for sale at auction. It was described as being '...of very capital brick earth, about nine feet deep, nearly five feet of which is malm, of a superior quality.' By 1819 a canal arm known as Yiewsley Dock had been created to service the brickfield. This is where Kiln Lodge is located today.

In 1820 a branch of the canal known as Otter Dock was opened. It would become the longest of Yiewsley's canal arms and docks constructed to service its brick industry. The main market for Yiewsley's bricks would be the expanding city of London and the principle product was what became known as the Cowley (or London) stock brick.

The stock brick was a dull brownish yellow. Its colour was achieved by adding ash and chalk roughly in the proportion 64% brickearth, 25% ash and 11% chalk. The bricks were made by hand in the brickfields by teams of workers employed in a unit known as a 'stool'. The most skilled workers were the ‘moulder’ who made the bricks and the 'clamp-setter' who was in charge of baking the bricks in the clamp kiln. The brick workers would be employed for about three months in the summer starting work at dawn and finishing at dusk and receiving payment by piece rates. The finished bricks were then transported mainly along the Grand Junction Canal to South Wharf in the Paddington Basin and to wharves along the Regent's Canal, but also to other locations along the canal and River Thames. The barges would return from London with coal ash. When added to the clay and chalk mixture the ash helped dry the bricks in the process of baking. Because the ash was brought ‘free’ from London in an otherwise empty barge it made the production of the stock brick very cost-effective.

Brick making expanded in Yiewsley through the early nineteenth century. In 1832 45 acres of Philpots Bridge Farm and 44 acres of Colham Manor Farm were leased for brick-working. By 1836 a number of cottages for labourers in the brickfields had been built south of the canal. By 1856 more than 240 acres in Hillingdon Parish were being worked for brickearth including 100 acres of rectorial glebe leased to Samuel Pocock in the south of the parish. The Ordinance Survey map Middlesex Sheet XIV surveyed in 1864 shows there was brickfield to the east of Horton Bridge Road and one to the south of the Grand Junction Canal in Starveall. Pocock had built a canal arm south from the Grand Junction Canal which became known as Pocock's Dock (after 1884 as Broad's or Starveall Dock) and it extended 1,250ft south of the canal into the fields around Starveall Farm.

The Ordinance Survey map of 1864 also showed that extractions around the Otter Dock had progressed to the underlying gravel. However there were brickfields north of Otter Dock. A Clay Mill was located where Gorse Walk is today and a Wash Mill was located on the east side of Royal Lane, near to where the junction with Heather Lane is today.

In March 1874 Samuel Pocock leased 45 acres of an open field containing brickearth in West Drayton Parish which was directly south of his existing Hillingdon Parish brickfields at Starveall. Pocock extended his arm of the canal south to serve the new West Drayton brickfield. In 1879 a condition of his lease from the Ecclesiastical Commissioners was to produce at least 4 million bricks yearly from the West Drayton field. Brickfield lessees paid a royalty on every thousand bricks they produced. In July 1879 Pocock stated at a committee of the House of Commons discussing the proposed Langley and Slough Branch of the Grand Junction canal that between his Hillingdon and West Drayton Parish brickfields he been making 15–20 million bricks per year. In 1884 Pocock conveyed his interests in the brickfields to Clement Burgess Broad and George Harris, of South Wharf, Paddington.

The Ordinance Survey map Middlesex XIV.SE revised in 1894 shows that the gravel pits around the Otter Dock and the brickfields north of the arm were no longer in production. However to the east of Horton Bridge two arms, Cooper's Dock and Liddall's Dock, had been dug from the Grand Junction Canal north to Horton Road. From Liddall's Dock a tramway crossed Horton Road before separating into tracks routing into brickfields to the north, north-east and east. Two tramway tracks also ran from the Starveall brickfields under the Great Western Railway to Rutter's Dock on the canal. A further tramway ran to a rail-head at the canal side 100ft east of Horton Bridge and a track had been constructed from the West Drayton brickfield, running past the Starveall Farm buildings to a rail-head at Broad's (Pocock's) dock.

By the 1890s it is estimated that 100 million bricks per year were being produced in west Middlesex, supplying the demand for building materials of Victorian London. At its peak, about 1890, Broad's brickfields were working 18 to 20 stools and giving seasonal employment to between 400 and 500 men. With this high production rate, the deposits of brickearth were becoming depleted by the start of the 20th century. By 1912 the extraction of underlying gravel and sands had replaced brick production in the former brickfields north of the canal. A significant party in this gravel and sand industry was H. Sabey and Co. The extraction of gravel and sands expanded northwards and continued until the late 1970s. The excavated areas were landscaped in the 1980s into what is today Stockley Country Park.

South of the Grand Junction Canal in 1913, brickearth was still being extracted at Hyde Field, the most southern part of the now Yiewsley Urban District. The brickearth was carried by tramway to the Stockley Brick Works which was located in the north of the West Drayton brickfield. However by 1930 the works were only producing 2 million bricks a year and the brickfield was closed in 1935.

Today there is little obvious evidence of Yiewsley's extensive brick industry of the nineteenth century. However there are four eponymous roads. Otterfield Road and Otter Way reflect the route of the Otter Dock. Liddall Way pays tribute to Liddall's Dock and Clayfield Way to the brickfield where Prologis Park West London is now located.

==== Great Western Railway ====
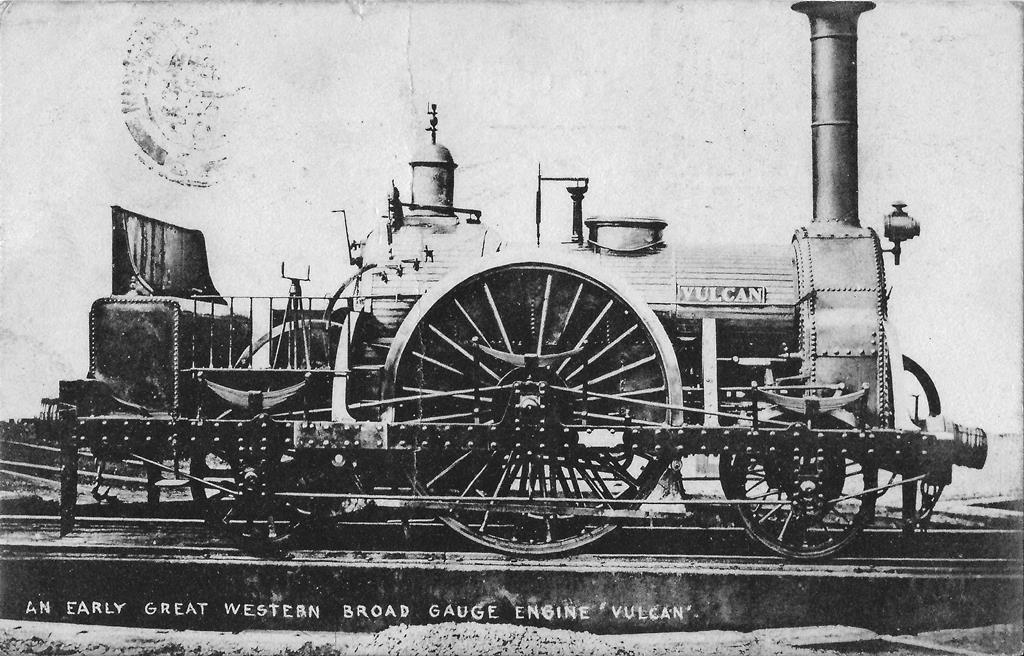
Vulcan, the first locomotive on the Great Western Railway

The construction of the Great Western Railway (GWR) began in 1835, and the line between Paddington and Maidenhead was opened on 4 June 1838, with West Drayton being its first station from London. The broad gauge Vulcan was the first locomotive to run on the GWR, on 28 December 1837, when it completed a successful mile-and-a-half test run down the line from Yiewsley to Iver. Having been constructed in Newton-le-Willows by Charles Tayleur & Co., the locomotive, together with another called Premier, had been taken by barge from the London docks and unloaded between Horton Bridge and West Drayton Station.

On 9 April 1839 the world's first commercial telegraph was inaugurated between Paddington and West Drayton Station by William Fothergill Cooke and Charles Wheatstone. A GWR branch line to Uxbridge Vine Street was opened on 8 September 1856.

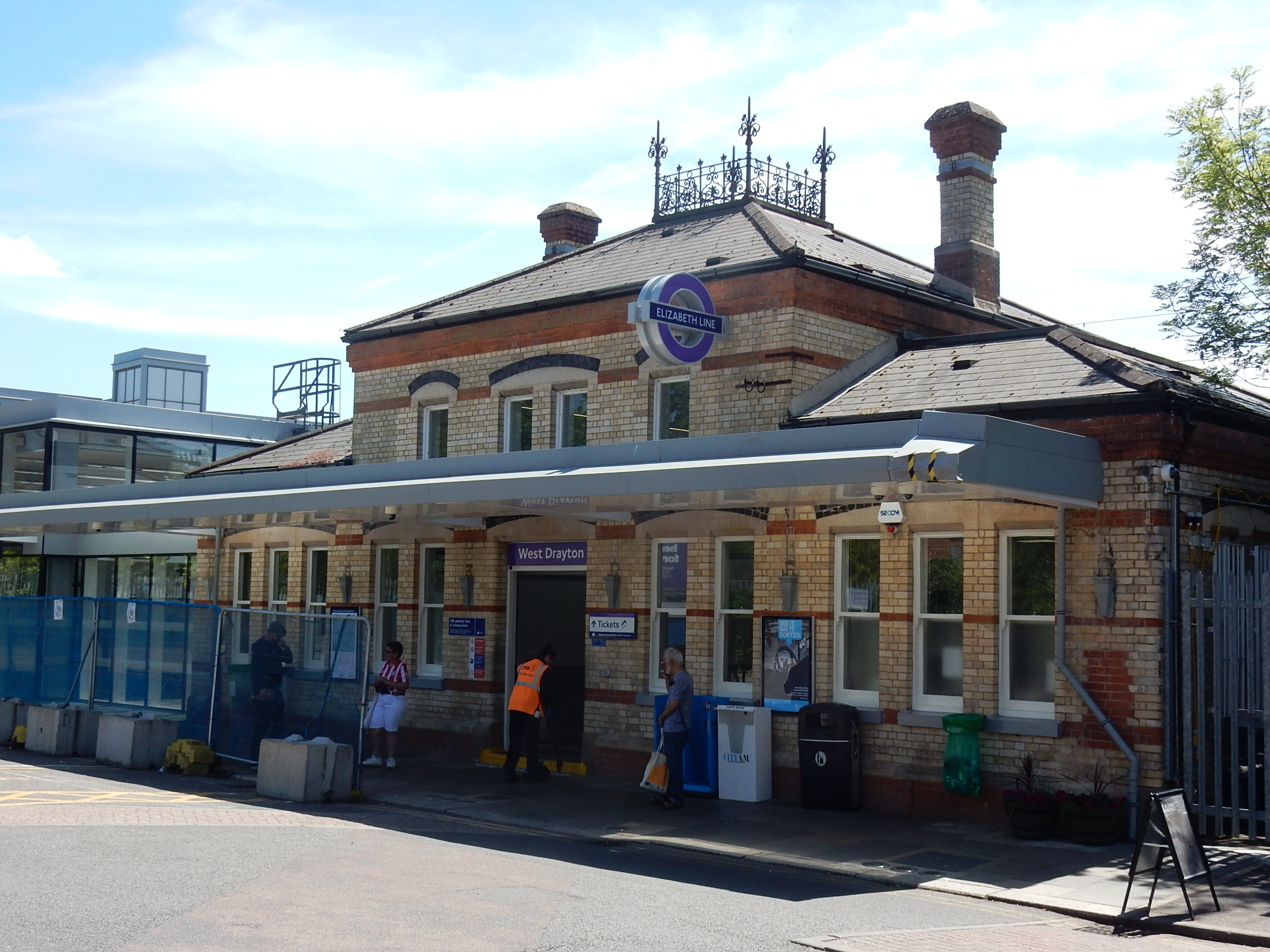
West Drayton station

On the afternoon of 6 February 1874, a double collision occurred in thick fog on the main line by Horton Bridge. The 10:25 am Exeter Express, drawn by the locomotive Prometheus, travelling at around 60 mph (97 km/h) towards Paddington, struck the rear of a Bristol goods train laden with timber and blocks of Bath stone which was being moved into sidings. The trains were rammed together, piling up six or seven of the vans and store trucks of the goods train, scattering train wreckage, the blocks of bath stone, logs of timber and other goods which completely blocked both up and down lines. The 2:15 pm locomotive No. 583 from Paddington ran into the debris, which threw it off the line and derailed several of its carriages, although they were not overturned. Its engine driver and fireman jumped clear before the impact. The guard of the Exeter Express died, but there were no serious injuries to any passengers.

West Drayton station was relocated 200 yd east to its present position on Station Approach from Tavistock Road on 9 April 1884, four months before a second branch line, operated by the Staines and West Drayton Railway (S&WDR), was opened on 9 August 1884. In 1895 the station was renamed West Drayton and Yiewsley station.

==== Diversification of industry from the mid-1800s ====
By the middle of the 19th century, brick production and flour milling were Yiewsley's main industries; however, new industry was beginning to develop. The Victoria oil mills near Colham Wharf were established before 1855. In 1865 the works were owned by Walter Graham & Co, producing linseed cake. A chemical works owned by Alfred White and Sons in 1890 was established by 1864 in the south of the parish. The Hillingdon Varnish works, situated to the west of Iron Bridge Road, had been established by 1868. In June 1890 it was owned by Messrs Wilkinson, Heyward and Clark. In 1874 W. Gillespie & Co. were manufacturing engines and boilers at the Foundry and Engineering Works, and in 1875 horizontal condensing engines were being made by Edwin Philip Bastin & Company at the Alliance Engine Works. In 1880 Edward Stewart & Co. operated the West Drayton cement works, and in 1890 the Electrical Engineering Corporation was making electrical equipment and dynamos. An India-rubber mill had been established by 1894 on Trout Road; in 1900 it was owned J. E. Hopkinson & Co. In 1898 the Padcroft Saw Mills were being operated by John A. Holland. By 1900 the Rotary Photographic Company was established opposite Lower Colham Mill, and in 1903 the Power Plant Co. was established, producing helical gears and couplings. In 1913 the Steam Fittings Company Ltd in Horton Road was producing steam traps to be used in navy vessels. The company changed its name to the Drayton Regulator and Instrument Company in 1926. Also by 1913, printing works had been established on Tavistock Road and Horton Bridge Road. In 1916 C. J. Culliford & Son operated the Lithographic Printing Works. Also in 1916, the Onslow Cotton Mill was established on Trout Road. In late 1917 The West Drayton Glass Works was founded on Horton Road. In 1918 Frederick Bird & Co. of the West Drayton Engineering Works, also on Horton Road, had been manufacturing engineering products to the army and navy as part of the war effort. Government contracts were also given to Squire & Son to produce glycerine, and Messrs Sabey for the supply of gravel. In 1919 The Anglo-Swiss Screw Company was established on Trout Road, the same year as the S. C. Johnson & Son wax company opened their factory on the site of Colham Wharf.

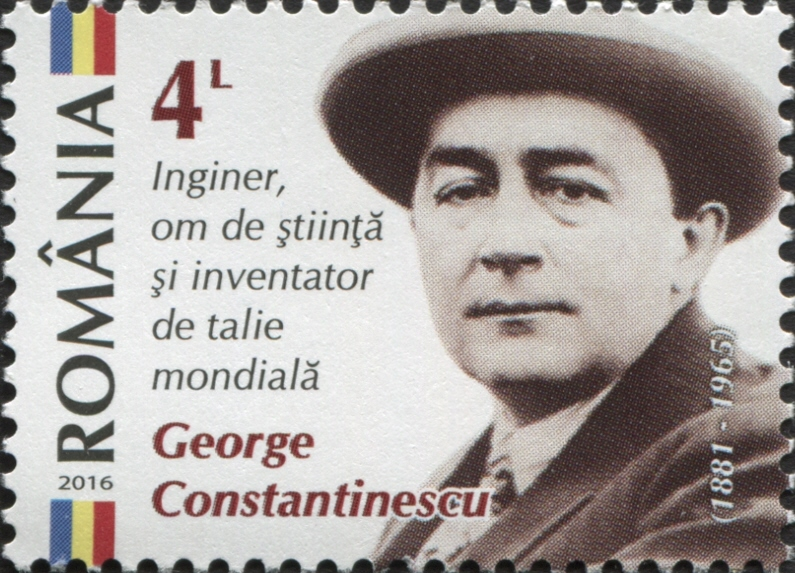
Romanian stamp showing the Romanian-born engineer George Constantinescu

In 1920 the Admiralty Engineering Laboratory was operational in the south of the Yiewsley Urban District, specialising in experimental work for the Royal Navy. During the war, the Sonic laboratory had been established in the building to develop the engineering inventions of George (Gogu) Constantinescu. He had begun the development of the Constantinesco-Colley Fire Control Timing Gear (C.C. gear) for synchronising machine gun fire through aircraft propellers at his laboratory at the Haddon Engineering Works in Alperton. His system worked by using wave pulses which were generated and transmitted from a column of liquid (90% paraffin to 10% B.B. Mobiloil or P.924 (anti-freezing) oil), instead of a system of mechanical linkages which had been used in aircraft until then. Once initial operational issues were overcome, the C.C. gear was not only more reliable than a mechanical linkage system, but also allowed a higher rate of fire and was readily adaptable to any type of engine and airframe. The first working C.C. gear was successfully air-tested on a B.E.2c aircraft in August 1916, and was fitted to No. 55 Squadron's DH.4's before their arrival in France on 6 March 1917. In the following days, they were joined by Bristol Fighters of No. 48 Squadron and S.E.5's of No. 56 Squadron. During the period March to December 1917, a total of 6000 C.C. gears were issued. From November 1917, the C.C. gear was fitted to all new British-made aircraft with synchronised guns. Between January and October 1918, 20,000 C.C. gears were delivered. Speaking after the end of the war Air Vice-Marshal Sir John Maitland said it had played a significant role in achieving final air superiority over the Luftstreitkräfte. On 25 March 1919 Queen Mary and Queen Marie of Romania visited the Sonic laboratory, where Constantinescu was warmly congratulated by the two queens for his work.

In the 1920s, Trout Road developed as a centre for companies involved in oils and chemical production. In 1921 K. B. Mavlankar was producing essential oils at the British Aromatic Chemical Works on Trout Road. From 1928 the Kenilworth Chemical Manufacturing Company and the English Metal Powder Company operated factories in Trout Road. Their factory was transferred after 1935 to the Middlesex Oil and Chemical Works Ltd, manufacturing oils, petroleum jellies, and resins. The Kenilworth Chemical and English Metal Powder companies then moved to an adjoining site in Trout Road. From the 1930s, several smaller companies manufacturing chemicals, plastics, and engineering components were established on and around Trout Road, increasing to more than 40 companies in the area.

Two firms began production of motor vehicles in Yiewsley after the Second World War. Road Machines of Horton Parade employed 250 people manufacturing a range of contractors' plant including weight batching equipment, dumpers and monorail transporters. An adaptation of their modular-track monorail system was used at Pinewood Studios in the 1967 James Bond film You Only Live Twice. In 1952 James Whitson & Co. moved from Sipson and began manufacturing coaches and fire engines in Yiewsley High Street. At its peak, the company employed 350 people. They would later manufacture glass-fibre components for commercial vehicles.

Most of Yiewsley's early companies chose West Drayton as their business address, although they were in neither West Drayton nor the Parish of West Drayton. Furthermore, West Drayton remained a largely rural village until the 20th century, and then became a mostly residential area. A possible reason is that the railway station had been called West Drayton since opening in 1838, changing to West Drayton and Yiewsley only in 1895. With the railways becoming the principal form of transport in the latter half of the 19th century, it seems businesses believed it was commercially advantageous to adopt West Drayton as their address.

==== Decline in railway usage ====
By the 1960s the demand for rail travel was falling. The branch line to Uxbridge Vine St was particularly affected by competition from the town's London Underground lines. Passenger services to Uxbridge were stopped in 1962; however, a short section of line (about 745 yards) to the Middlesex Oil and Chemical Works on Trout Road continued in use for freight services until 8 January 1979. The Staines line was closed to passengers in 1965 as a consequence of 1963 report "The Reshaping of British Railways" by Dr Richard Beeching, Chairman of the British Railways Board (BRB). The line continues to be used for freight services as far as Colnbrook.

Another consequence of the Beeching report was the closure of over 2000 railway stations across Great Britain. From 1968 until 1980, a policy was adopted by the British Railways Board to shorten the remaining stations' names where possible. This resulted in Yiewsley being removed from the station name after 79 years on 6 May 1974.

==== Padcroft College and Boys' Home ====
In May 1875, Padcroft House, a 14-room family residence with stables and nearly an acre of gardens located 100 yds south of the Trout Road canal bridge was advertised for sale or let. On 4 October 1875, Padcroft College was opened, with Principal Mr G. H. Jones FSA offering a course of education consisting of "Divinity, French, German, Latin, Greek, Mathematics, Natural Science, Drawing, and other branches of a liberal English education". Fees were eight guineas per annum. The college became the most important private school in the area, teaching up to a hundred pupils a year, with some boarders. Sport, principally cricket, football and lawn tennis, played an important role in college life, with the college grounds having 8 acres (3.2 ha) of enclosed meadow land situated between Grand Junction Canal and the Frays River. Fishing and boating on the Frays were offered as additional pastimes. From 1887 the college became known as the Padcroft Grammar School, and from 1891 as the Padcroft School. It closed in November 1901. 52 Padcroftian Old Boys fell in the Great War.

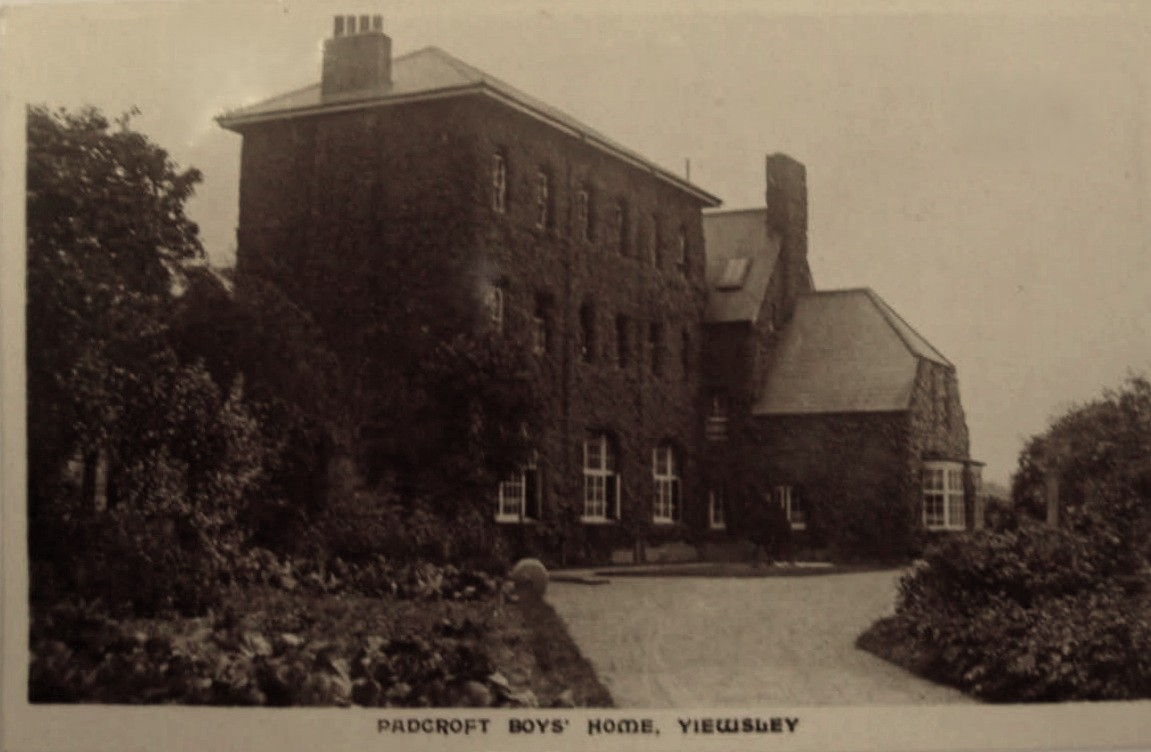
Postcard of Padcroft Boys' Home

The college building and nearly four acres of the grounds were sold to the London Diocesan Branch of the Church of England Temperance Society. The building was reopened in June 1902 as the Padcroft Boys' Home by Sir Albert de Rutzen, Chief Metropolitan Magistrate. Its purpose was to take in first-time offenders who had come before a magistrates' court and give them guidance, an education in handicraft, and employment. It catered for about 40 boys at a time, aged 14–18 years, and was run by the Society's London Police Court Mission (LPCM). On 27 October 1904, the building was largely destroyed by fire; everyone escaped. It was rebuilt, reopening in January 1906 after using temporary accommodation. Writing of the Padcroft Boys' Home, the 1918 LPCM brochure Saving the Lads stated that "958 of our Old Boys are serving in HM Forces, many have been mentioned in dispatches. One has won the VC, five the DCM, five received Commissions." A relationship with the Pilkington glass works in St Helens was developed. From 1912 to 1927, Pilkington ran a hostel in Ravenhead for Padcroft boys, who then worked chiefly with glass tanks and kilns. By 1919 over 200 boys had found work there. Padcroft later became a remand home and a probation home. By its closure in February 1949, 7583 boys had passed through the home.

The building was bought by Middlesex County Council as a community centre, and was in use into the 1960s, before being redeveloped.

=== Political development ===
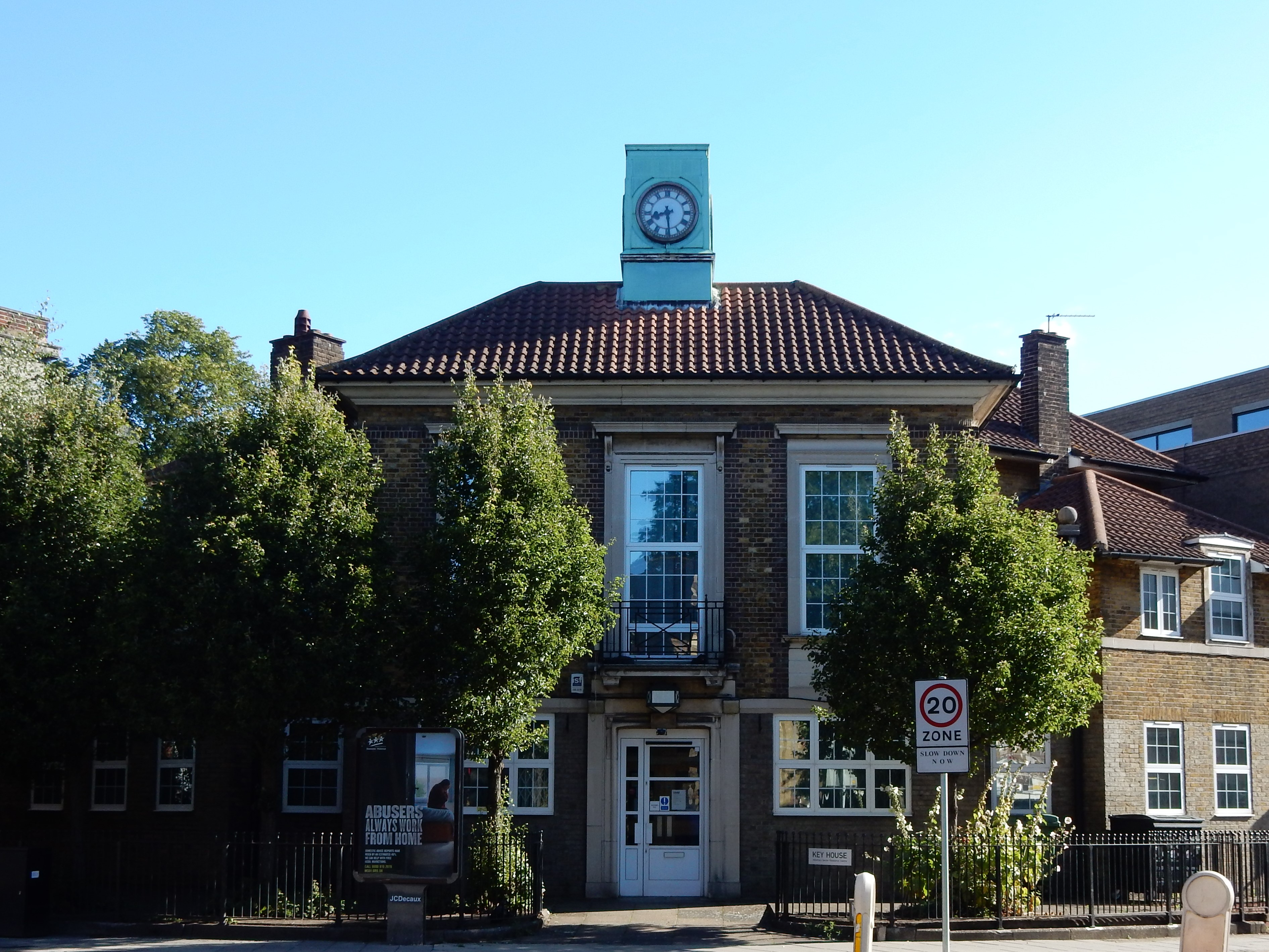
Key House, High Street, former Town Hall of Yiewsley & West Drayton Urban District 1930–1952

On 1 April 1896 Yiewsley became a civil parish, being formed from part of Hillingdon East, on 1 April 1949 the parish was abolished to form Yiewsley and West Drayton. At the 1931 census (the last before the abolition of the parish), Yiewsley had a population of 7126.

=== Yiewsley today ===
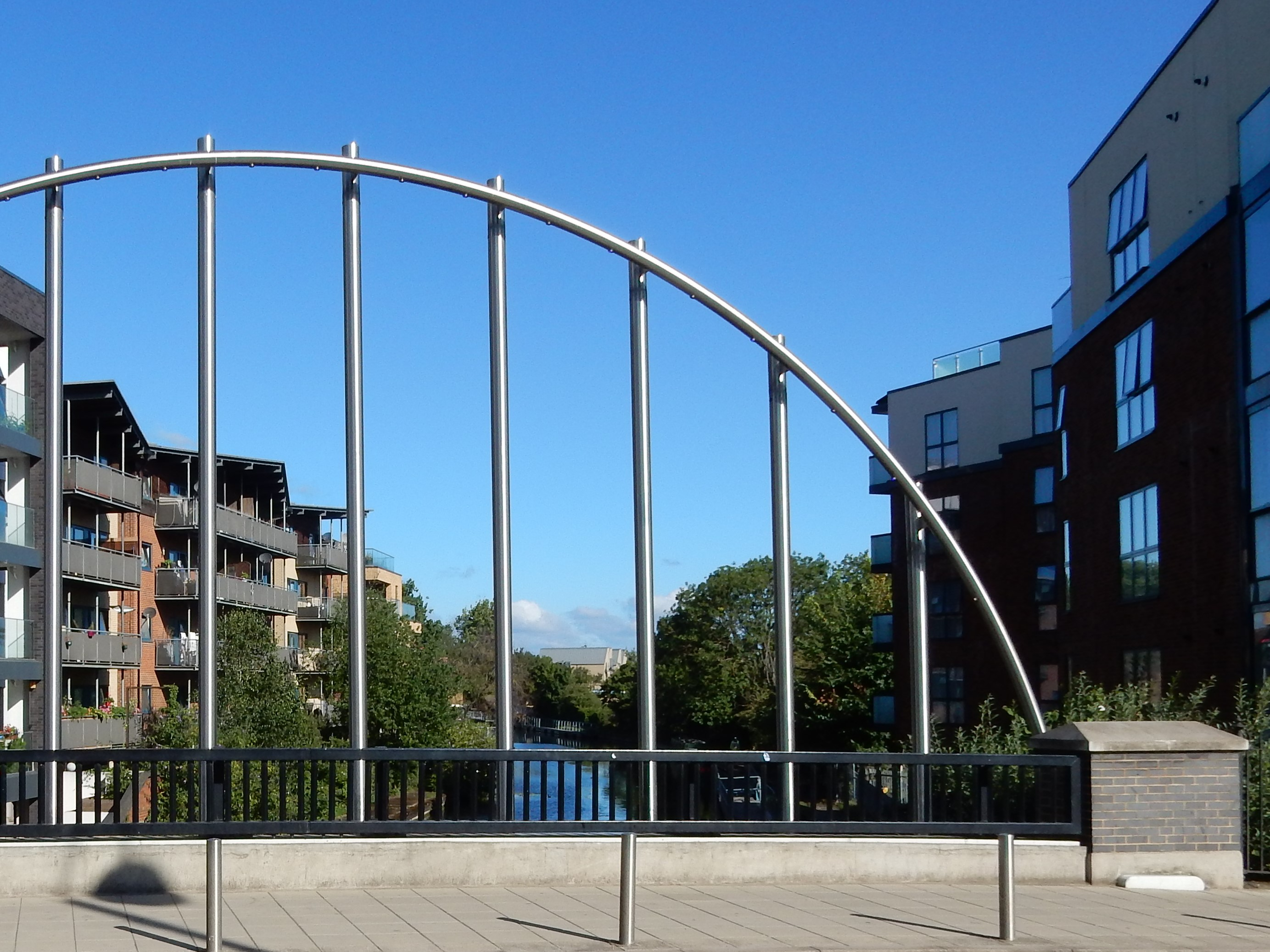
Grand Union Canal at Colham Bridge, High Street

Yiewsley today is a growing community with both residential housing and commercial businesses. With the establishment of the Elizabeth line and as a consequence of the London Plan and Hillingdon Local Plan, there has been significant construction of residential apartments on former industrial and manufacturing sites. Yiewsley has an active High Street, with national retail outlets Tesco, Iceland, B&M Stores, Home Bargains, Aldi and Savers situated on it. Together with local businesses in Yiewsley and Uxbridge, Heathrow Airport is a major source of employment in the area.

== Public services ==
- P3 Charity Yiewsley Navigator is an advice centre for young people on Fairfield Road.
- Yiewsley Health Centre on Yiewsley High Street incorporates The High Street Practice and the Yiewsley Family Practice.
- Otterfield Medical Centre is situated on Otterfield Road.
- West Drayton and Yiewsley Dental provide NHS dental care on Providence Road.
- Yiewsley Library closed in October 2025. A new library is due to open in Otterfield Road in late 2026.

== Education ==
Primary schools

- St Matthew's CE Primary School, High Street
- Rabbsfarm Primary School, Gordon Road

Secondary school

- Park Academy West London, Park View Road

Special and alternative schools

- Yiewsley Grange Primary School, High Street
- The Skills Hub, Falling Lane

== Political representation ==
- Yiewsley's Member of Parliament is Danny Beales MP
- Yiewsley's elected representative in the London Assembly is Bassam Mahfouz
- The Yiewsley ward councillors in the Hillingdon Borough Council are:
  - Councillor Sophie Dror
  - Councillor Stacey Lucas

== St Matthew's parish church ==
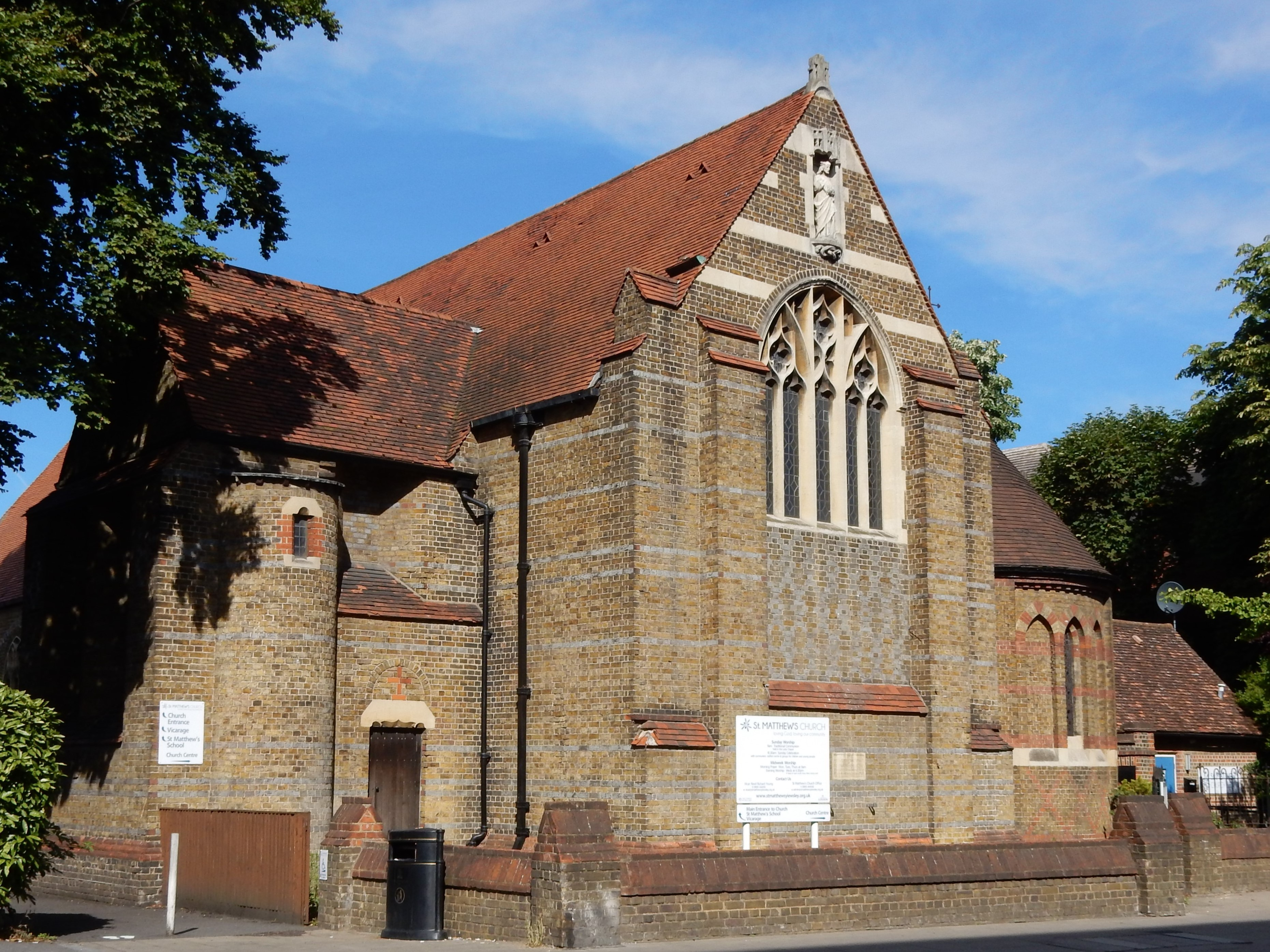
St Matthew's parish church

Until the mid-19th century, Yiewsley was a district of the parish of St John the Baptist church, Hillingdon. After the opening of the brickfields, Yiewsley's population started to grow, and work began on building a mission church (also referred to as a chapel of ease). St Matthew's Church was designed by Sir George Gilbert Scott and was consecrated on 6 July 1859. Yiewsley became a separate ecclesiastical parish in 1874.

With the population of Yiewsley continuing to grow in the latter years of the 19th century, more room was required in the church. Architect Sir Charles Nicholson was consulted to design the enlargement to the church, and its foundation stone was laid on 24 September 1897. The church was consecrated by the Bishop of London on 25 April 1898.

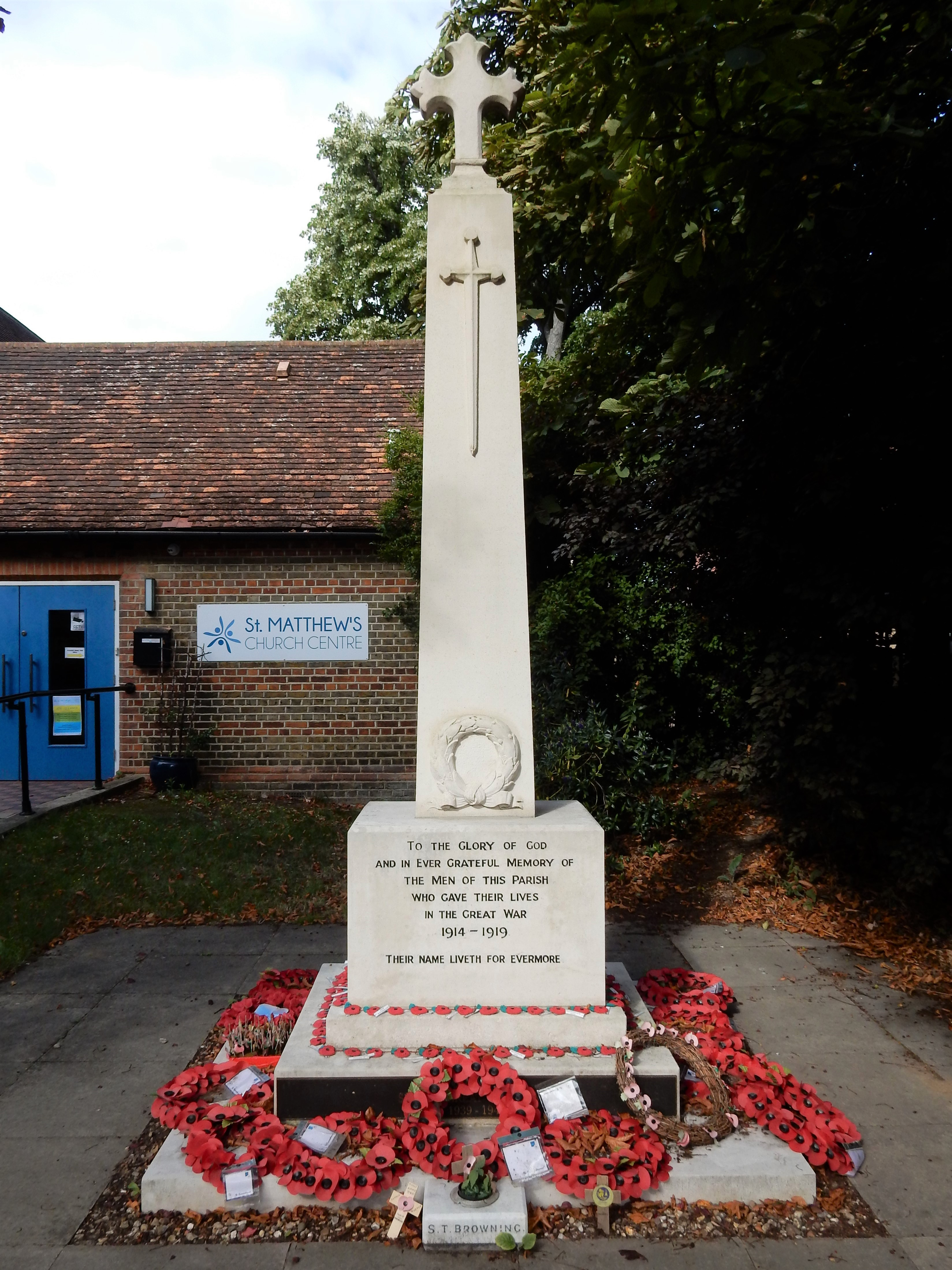
Yiewsley War Memorial

Yiewsley War Memorial stands in the grounds of St Matthew's Church. It was unveiled on Saturday 28 May 1921 by Lady Delia Peel in honour of the 128 men of the parish who fell in the Great War. Her husband, Yiewsley's Member of Parliament Col. Hon. Sidney Peel, gave an address to the assembled people of Yiewsley before the unveiling. In the address, he stated that the population of Yiewsley at the time was under 5000, but more than 530 men of the parish had served in His Majesty's Army during the war – more than one in ten of the whole population of the place, including women and children. Before closing his address with the names of the men inscribed on the memorial, he stated that it had been put there in order that the people of Yiewsley in time to come might bring their children to it and point out to them the names of father, grandfather or some other relative, and tell them of the great things that were done by their predecessors, so that it might be an inspiration and hope for the future.

On 4 October 2009, the war memorial was rededicated by Peter Broadbent, the Bishop of Willesden, to include the names of the 73 men of the parish who fell in the Second World War. A ceremony with the laying of wreaths is held at the War Memorial on Remembrance Sunday each year.

== Culture and recreation ==
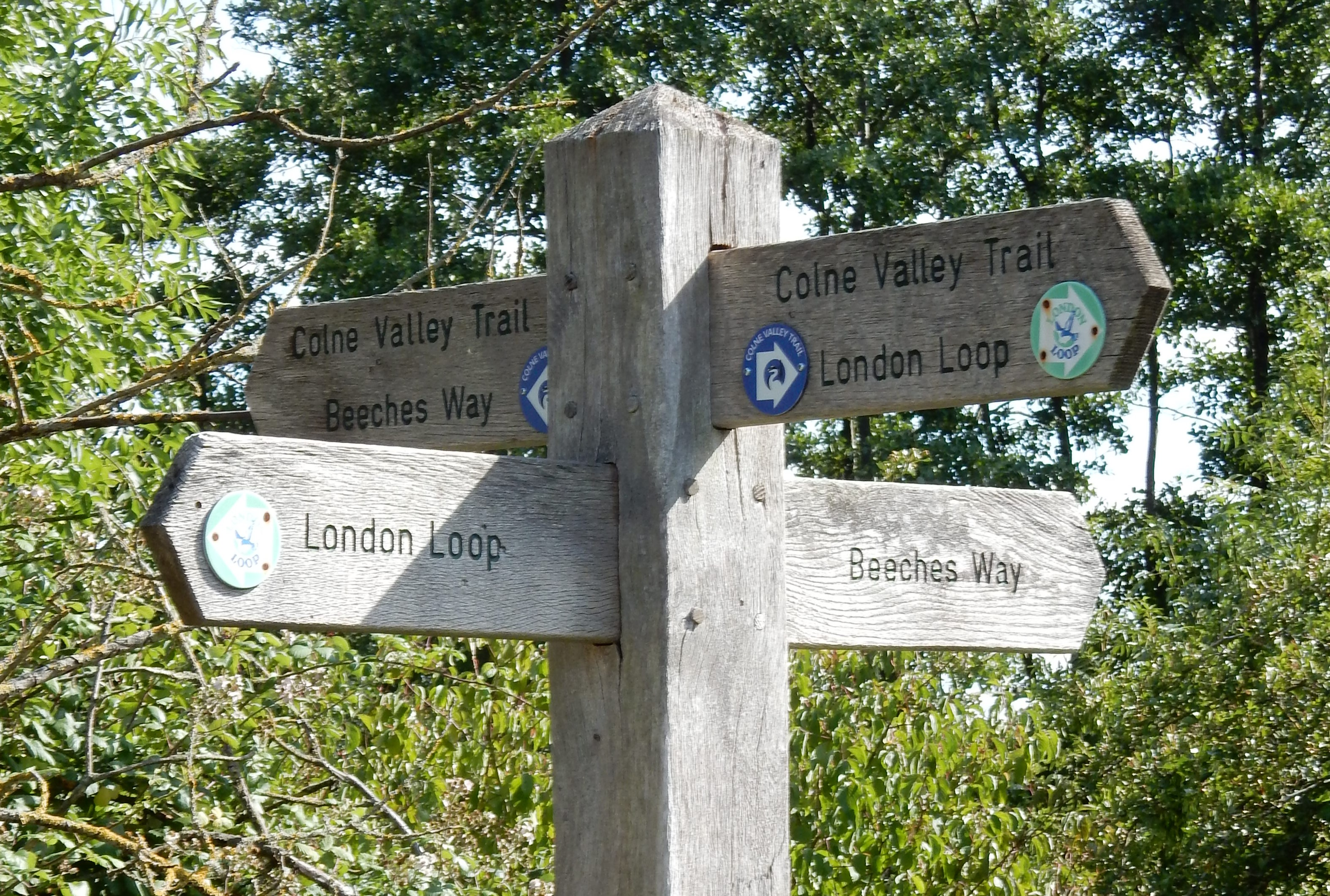
Signpost showing intersecting walking routes at Trout Lane

- The Yiewsley and West Drayton Arts Council maintain the Southlands Arts Centre in The Green, West Drayton. They oversee events and promote local creativity. There are many exhibitions, music festivals, and creative endeavours from fine arts, photography, film-making and music groups.
- Community events are held at Yiewsley's three churches, St Matthew's Parish Church, Yiewsley Baptist Church and Yiewsley Methodist church. Events are also held at the Yiewsley and West Drayton Community Centre in Harmondsworth Road, West Drayton.
- The Outline Community Theatre Company is based at St Matthew's Church, and stages productions of both modern and classic theatre in the local area.
- The Hillingdon Theatre Dance Centre offers classes at Yiewsley Methodist Church Hall and at Rabbsfarm Primary School.
- The Yiewsley and West Drayton Band is a third-section brass band established in 1890, and maintains a year-round programme of concerts and community events.
- 1381 Squadron (West Drayton & Yiewsley) Royal Air Force Air Cadets are based at Summer Drive, West Drayton.
- Yiewsley Recreation Ground is situated between Falling Lane and Yiewsley High Street.

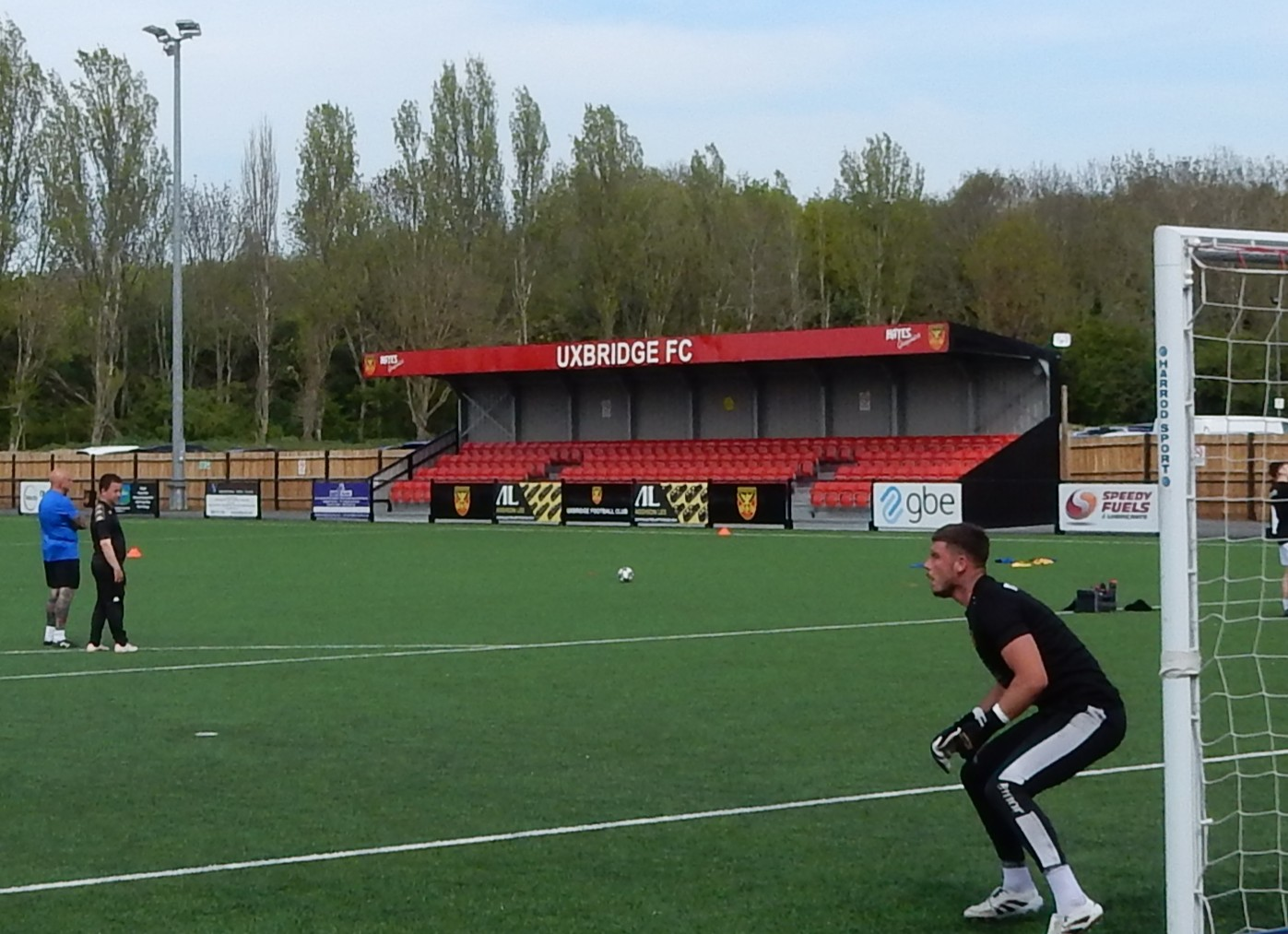
Uxbridge F.C.'s ground "Honeycroft" on Horton Road

- Uxbridge F.C., established 1871, are one of the oldest football clubs in the south of England. They play at Honeycroft on Horton Road.
- PureGym are situated in Continental House on Yiewsley High Street.
- Stockley Country Park has a network of footpaths in its 274 acres (111 ha) of parkland, and views across the local area. There is an 18-hole golf course, split in two by the A408 main road but linked by a cable-stayed bridge.
- The Beeches Way, the Celandine Route, the Colne Valley Trail, the Grand Union Canal Walk, the London Loop and Shakespeare's Way are routed along the footpaths, bridleways and canal towpaths in Yiewsley.
- Two fisheries have coarse fishing in their lakes in Yiewsley: Thorney Weir the Mets in Trout Lane; and Lizard Lakes in Trout Road.
- The Grand Union Canal gives boating access to the network of canals and rivers of England. Canalside moorings are available through Yiewsley, with the nearest marina being the Packet Boat Marina at Cowley Peachey. High Line Yachting operate boatyards on the Grand Union main line at Cowley Peachey and on the Grand Union Slough Arm at Iver.

== Literature ==
In his book Yiewsley published May 2026, poet Daljit Nagra writes a autobiographical collection exploring his experiences growing up in Yiewsley from the 1960s to the 1980s.

== Commerce ==
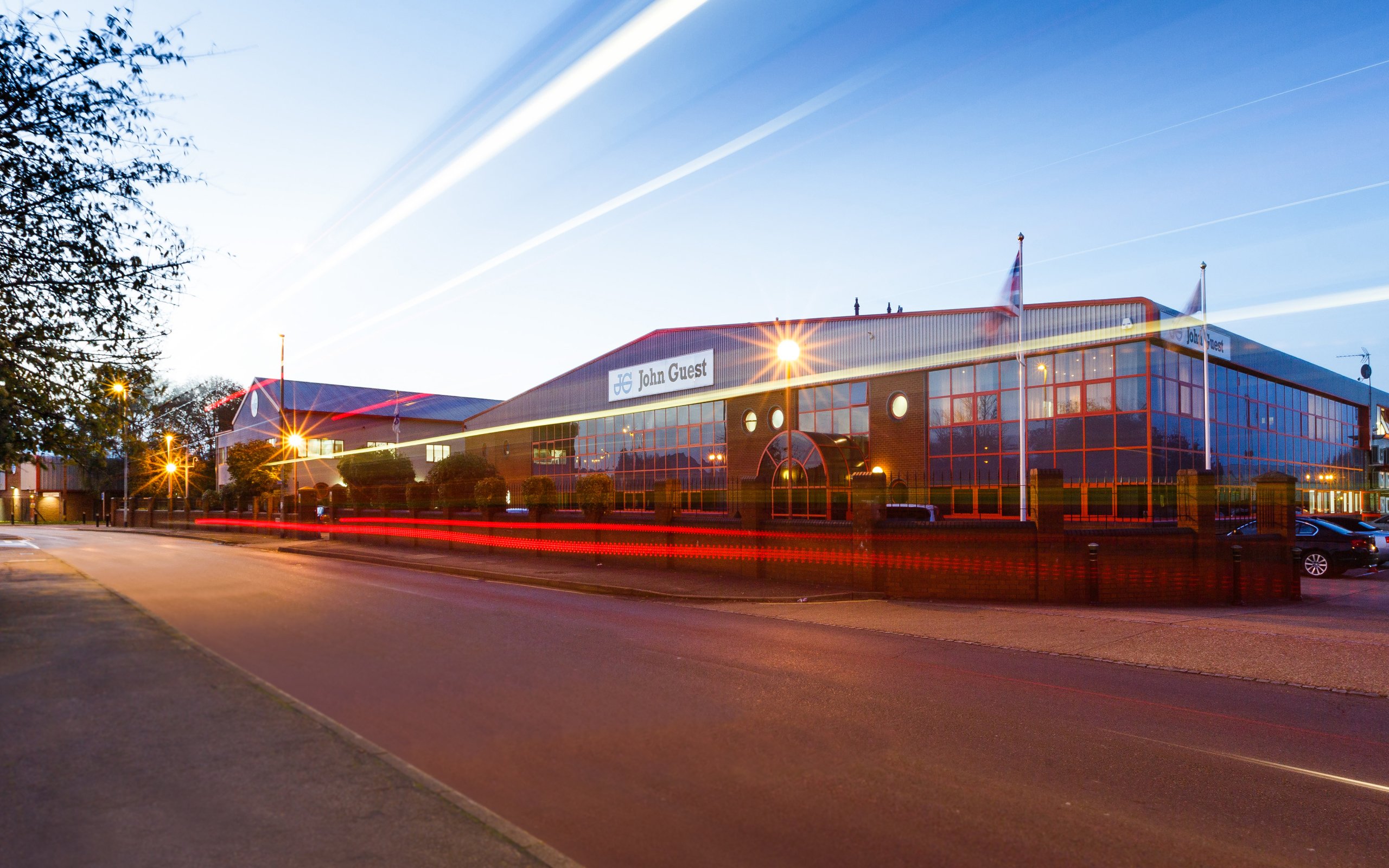
RWC (formerly John Guest) headquarters on Horton Road

Yiewsley's main commercial area is on and adjacent to Horton Road. There are over 70 businesses located here, including the Speedfit pipe fittings manufacturer John Guest (part of RWC Ltd). New Pro Foundries in Horton Close have produced the bronze BAFTA awards. The data centre company Virtus have the UK's largest data centre campus here at Prologis Park West London. East of Horton Road, across the A308 Stockley Road is the Stockley Business Park.

Heidelberg Materials UK operate at two sites in Yiewsley. They have a rail depot at the Old Coal Yard, Tavistock Road and an aggregates facility on Iron Bridge Road South.

== Transport ==
=== Rail ===
West Drayton railway station is located at the southern end of Yiewsley High Street and is on the Great Western Main Line. The Elizabeth line operates a stopping service between Abbey Wood and Reading. The station is also served by a small number of early morning and late evening Great Western Railway services between London Paddington and Reading.

=== Road ===
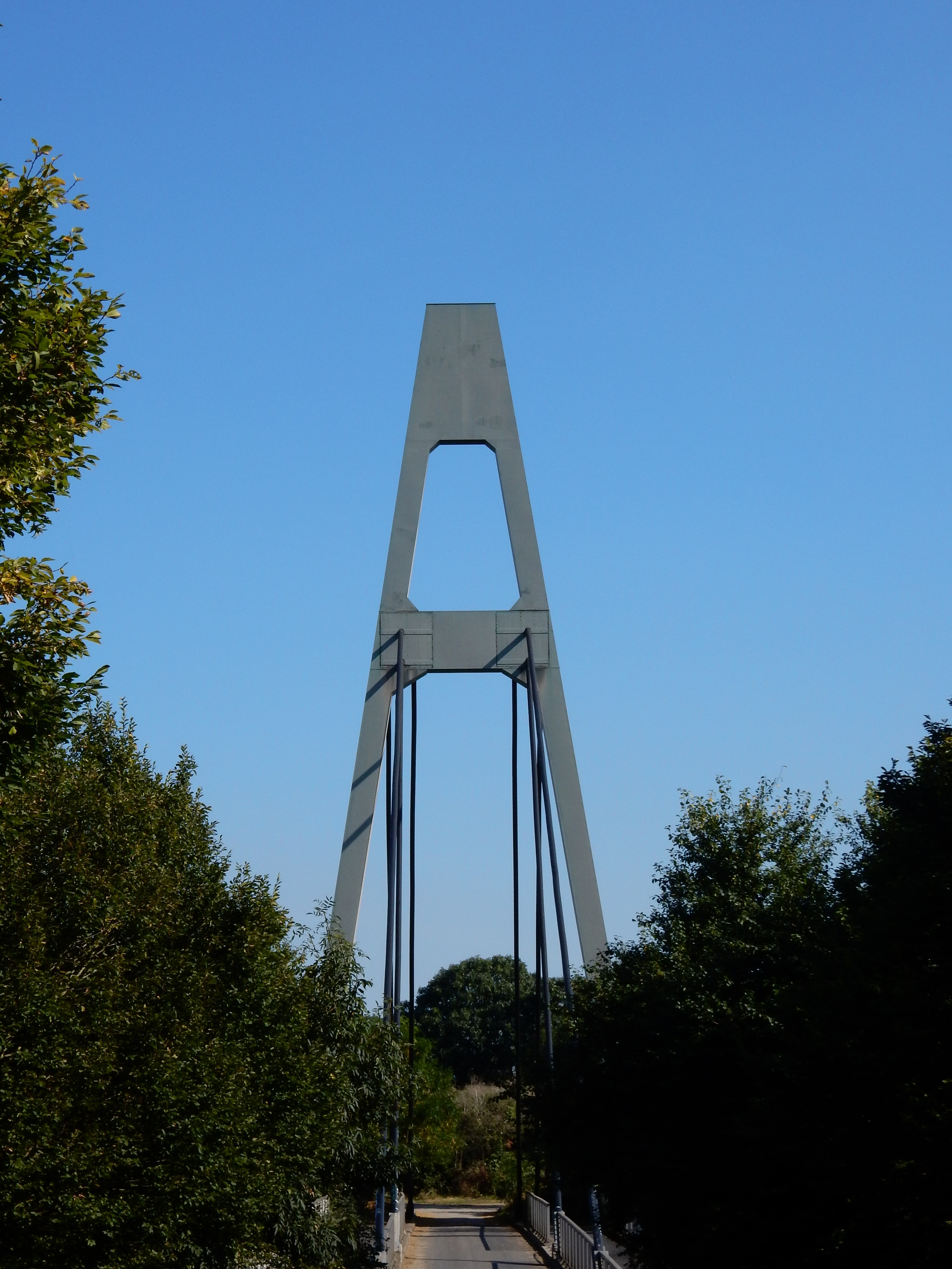
Cable-stayed footbridge over the A408 Stockley Road

Yiewsley is served by the M4 and M25 motorways about a mile to its south and west respectively, which interconnect at Thorney Interchange. The A408 Stockley Road dual carriageway on the eastern side of Yiewsley acts as a bypass, avoiding the town centre.

=== Buses ===
There are regular London bus services from Yiewsley to Uxbridge, Hayes, Ruislip, Hounslow and the Heathrow Airport terminals.

=== Air ===
Heathrow Airport lies 2.5 miles (4 km) south of Yiewsley.

== Notable people ==
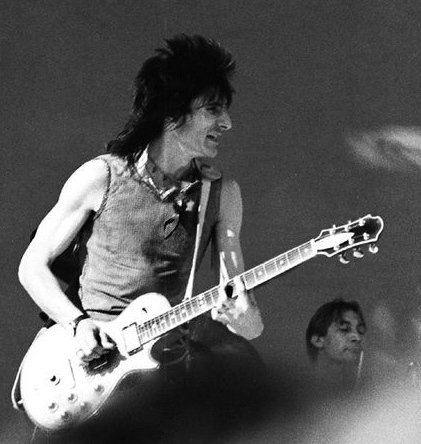
Ronnie Wood of the Rolling Stones in 1981

- Ronnie Wood (born 1947), guitarist in rock bands The Rolling Stones and Faces, grew up in Whitethorn Avenue, attending St Stephen's Infant School and St Matthew's Church of England Primary School.
- Art Wood (1937–2006), vocalist of the Sixties rhythm and blues group The Artwoods, grew up in Whitethorn Avenue.
- Ted Wood (1939–2003), traditional jazz vocalist and drummer, was born in Yiewsley, growing up in Whitethorn Avenue.
- Musician Kim Gardner (1948–2001), of The Birds, The Creation and Ashton, Gardner and Dyke, grew up in Yiewsley.
- Cinematographer Wally Gentleman (1926–2001), whose credits include the special effects on 2001: A Space Odyssey and Universe, was born in Yiewsley.
- George Thomas Moore Marriott (1885–1949), regarded as one of the best stage and screen character actors of his generation, was born in Alpha Place, High Street.
- Daljit Nagra (born 1966) is a celebrated poet and professor. He was born in Hillingdon Hospital and grew up in Yiewsley.
