= HMS Onslaught (S14) =

Submarine of the Royal Navy

- HMS Onslaught

History

United Kingdom
- Name: Onslaught
- Builder: Chatham Dockyard
- Laid down: 8 April 1959
- Launched: 24 September 1960
- Commissioned: 14 August 1962
- Decommissioned: 1990
- Identification: Pennant number: S14

General characteristics as designed
- Class & type: Oberon-class submarine
- Displacement: 1,610 tons standard; 2,030 tons full load surfaced; 2,410 tons full load submerged
- Length: 241 feet (73 m) between perpendiculars; 295.2 feet (90.0 m) length overall
- Beam: 26.5 feet (8.1 m)
- Draught: 18 feet (5.5 m)
- Propulsion: 2 × Admiralty Standard Range 16 VMS diesel generators; 2 × 3,000 shaft horsepower (2,200 kW) electric motors; 2 shafts
- Speed: 17 knots (31 km/h; 20 mph) submerged; 12 knots (22 km/h; 14 mph) surfaced
- Complement: 68
- Sensors & processing systems: Type 186 and Type 187 sonars; I-band surface search radar
- Armament: 8 × 21-inch (530 mm) torpedo tubes (6 forward, 2 aft); 24 torpedoes

HMS Onslaught was a British Oberon-class attack submarine operated by the Royal Navy.

== Design and construction ==
The Oberon class was a direct follow on of the Porpoise-class, with the same dimensions and external design, but updates to equipment and internal fittings, and a higher grade of steel used for fabrication of the pressure hull.

As designed for British service, the Oberon-class submarines were 241 feet (73 m) in length between perpendiculars and 295.2 feet (90.0 m) in length overall, with a beam of 26.5 feet (8.1 m), and a draught of 18 feet (5.5 m). Displacement was 1,610 tons standard, 2,030 tons full load when surfaced, and 2,410 tons full load when submerged. Propulsion machinery consisted of 2 Admiralty Standard Range 16 VMS diesel generators, and two 3,000 shaft horsepower (2,200 kW) electric motors, each driving a 7-foot-diameter (2.1 m), 3-bladed propeller at up to 400 rpm. Top speed was 17 knots (31 km/h; 20 mph) when submerged, and 12 knots (22 km/h; 14 mph) on the surface. Eight 21-inch (530 mm) diameter torpedo tubes were fitted (six facing forward, two aft), with a total payload of 24 torpedoes. The boats were fitted with Type 186 and Type 187 sonars, and an I-band surface search radar. The standard complement was 68: 6 officers, 62 sailors.

Onslaught was laid down by Chatham Dockyard on 8 April 1959, and launched on 24 September 1960. The boat was commissioned into the Royal Navy on 14 August 1962.

== Operational history ==
Onslaught was first assigned to the 2nd Submarine Squadron, based in Devonport. She was reassigned to the Singapore-based 7th Squadron in 1966, and received a refit in Devonport from 1970 to 1972. She was then assigned to the 1st Squadron in 1972. Her squadron assignment after 1983 is unknown.

Her patrols in the Mediterranean and Baltic seas from 1986 to 1988 are classified.

== Decommissioning and fate ==
Onslaught was paid off in 1990, and broken up at Aliağa, Turkey in 1991.

== Publications ==
- Colledge, J. J.; Warlow, Ben (2006) [1969]. Ships of the Royal Navy: The Complete Record of All Fighting Ships of the Royal Navy from the 15th Century to the Present (3rd Rev ed.). London: Chatham Publishing. ISBN 978-1-86176-281-8. OCLC 67375475.
- Hutchinson, Robert (2001). Jane's submarines : war beneath the waves from 1776 to the present day. London: HarperCollins. ISBN 978-0007105588..
