= HMS Ace =

Submarine of the Royal Navy

History

United Kingdom
- Name: Ace
- Builder: Devonport Dockyard
- Laid down: 3 November 1943
- Launched: 14 March 1945
- Identification: Pennant number: P414
- Fate: Scrapped in June 1950

General characteristics if completed
- Class & type: Amphion-class submarine
- Displacement: 1,385/1,620 tons (surfaced/submerged)
- Length: 279 ft 3 in (85.12 m) oa
- Beam: 22 ft 3 in (6.78 m)
- Draught: 17 ft 1 in (5.21 m)
- Depth: 500 ft (150 m)
- Installed power: 3,400 bhp (2,500 kW) diesel; 1,250 shp (930 kW) electric
- Propulsion: 2 × Admiralty 6-cylinder diesel engine; 2 × electric motors for submergence driving two shafts
- Speed: 17.5 kn (32.4 km/h; 20.1 mph) surfaced; 7 kn (13 km/h; 8.1 mph) submerged
- Range: 10,500 nmi (19,400 km; 12,100 mi) at 11 kn (20 km/h; 13 mph) surfaced
- Test depth: 600 ft (180 m)
- Capacity: 165 tons of fuel normal; 219 tons of fuel max
- Complement: 6 officers and 55 sailors
- Armament: 10 × 21 in (530 mm) torpedo tubes; 26 mines; 1 × 4 in (100 mm) deck gun, 3 × 0.303 machine gun, 1 × Oerlikon 20 mm AA gun

HMS Ace (P414) was an Amphion-class submarine of the Royal Navy laid down on 3 December 1943 and launched at Devonport Dockyard on 14 March 1945 during the Second World War. She was not completed because of the end of the war. However, her hull was used for explosives testing before she was sent in June 1950 to Smith & Houston of Port Glasgow, Scotland to be broken up.

== Construction ==
The Amphion-class or A class submarines were designed after the T-class submarines. They were designed to serve in the Pacific campaign, but most of them weren't completed before fighting ended. The Amphion-class submarines displaced 1385 tons surfaced and 1620 tons submerged. Their surface speed was 18.5 knots (34.3 km/h; 21.3 mph), and their submerged speed was 8 knots (15 km/h; 9.2 mph). The submarines were powered by diesel electric propulsion and two shafts. The onboard crew strength was 6 officers and 55 sailors. The submarines had ten 21 in (530 mm) torpedo tubes and carried a total of 20 torpedoes. There were four torpedo tubes on the bow, two on the bow exterior, two on the stern and two on the stern exterior. There were three 0.303 machine guns and one Oerlikon 20mm cannon as the anti-aircraft guns. The main deck gun was the QF 4-inch Mk XXII.

Ace was used as a target ship after World War II ended in 1945. Ace was fitted with 6-cylinder Admiralty engines because 8-cylinder engines weren't available. This reduced their speed by 1 knots and their power to 3,400 bhp (2,500 kW). Ace had 2 electric motors which produced 1,200 shp (890 kW). Ace was 279 feet 3 inches (85.12 m) long overall, had a beam of 22 feet 3 inches (6.78 m) and a draught of 17 feet 3 inches (5.26 m). The ship could carry 165 tons of fuel as a normal load and 219 tons of fuel as its maximum load. 60 tons were stored in internal tanks and 100 tons in external tanks, an extra 54 tons could be stored in the main tanks. Ace had a tinplated, circular-welded pressure hull, almost equivalent to a double hull. This allowed the ship to dive to a maximum operstional depth of 500 feet (150 m) and a test depth of 600 feet (180 m), though they would be moderately damaged below 200–300 feet (61–91 m).

== Bibliography ==
- Campbell, N. J. M (1980). "Great Britain". Conway's All The World's Fighting Ships, 1922-1946. London: Conway Maritime Press. pp. 2–85. ISBN 9780851771465.
