= RWC (disambiguation) =

RWC is a common abbreviation for the term Rugby World Cup, gender neutral name for the Men's Rugby World Cup and Women's Rugby World Cup, both quadrennial international rugby union competitions.

RWC may also refer to:

- Rawcliffe railway station, East Riding of Yorkshire; National Rail station code RWC
- Rear Window Captioning System
- Redwood City, California
- Reliance Worldwide Corporation, an ASX-listed company in the industrials sector
- Rideal-Walker coefficient, a figure expressing the disinfecting power of a substance
- Rich web client, a software application that is rich in features and executed inside a web browser
- Roberts Wesleyan College, a liberal arts college in North Chili, New York
- Russian Weapons Company, formed in 2011, the sole United States distributor of Russian manufactured Kalashnikov weapons
