= John Guest (company) =

Company based in Yiewsley, England

Premises at Yiewsley, London

John Guest is a British manufacturer of push-in fittings, pipe and plastic plumbing systems. Its industries and applications include drink dispensing, plumbing, pneumatics, compressed air Systems, water purification, drinks vending, automotive and telecommunications.

Headquartered in Yiewsley, England, John Guest has offices in North America, Asia, Europe as well as the Pacific. It was founded in 1961 by John Guest.

John Guest was acquired by Reliance Worldwide Corporation Ltd, in June 2018

== Company facts ==
John Guest has facilities in the UK, Europe, North America, Korea and the Pacific with over 1200 employees. Yiewsley is the production site for many of its products; however, the company has spread operations across sites in Hayes, Maidenhead, Bracknell and Launceston in the UK.

The first overseas company - John Guest SA was created in France in 1983. Two years later John Guest Pacific Ltd opened in Auckland, New Zealand and in 1986 John Guest USA Inc opened in New Jersey. John Guest Italia SRL opened in Turin, Italy, followed by John Guest Gmbh in Bielefeld in Germany in 1990. In 1997, new offices were established in Sydney, Australia - JG Pacific and John Guest SL in Barcelona, Spain. The first Far East operation opened in 2004 Seoul, South Korea. In 2005 the company opened an office in Ceske-Budejovice in the Czech Republic and in 2008 in Poznań in Poland.

== History ==
The company founder, John Guest, was born in Doncaster in 1927. Guest started his working life as a toolmaker apprentice in the Royal Ordnance factory in Hayes.

In 1950, Guest developed his first prototype hollow pressure die-casting machine. Under the name of John Guest Engineering, the newly established company specialized in tool making and precision engineering. It operated out of a small building that was known as Factory 1. The following year, John Guest Engineering merged with Guest Castings Ltd - a company specializing in zinc die-casting. This business also operated out of the Factory 1 site and its name remained unchanged until the early 1970s. During the 1960s both companies grew steadily specializing in simple die-cast products and tool making, consolidating their business in the white goods and automotive industries.

Renamed to John Guest Ltd in the early 1970s, Guest castings started producing more complex die-cast items and machining for the UK's major pneumatic valve manufacturers. The steady expansion enjoyed by the company was also the result of the investment in the second operation-machining department and painting facilities, including an automatic black elector-phonetic paint plant. In 1974, Guest invented the ‘speed fit’ tube connector concept followed by opening his second factory at Yiewsley covering around 9,000 sq ft the same year. In 1978 the company known today was formed, established specifically to market products designed and produced under the group name of John Guest Ltd.

John Guest Ltd. was recognized as a leading UK export manufacturer with two Queen's Awards for Export Achievement both in 1990 and 1995. In 2010, John Guest died aged 83. The three sons of John Guest serve as Directors. They are Robert, Barry and Tim Guest. More recently, two grandsons, Tristan and James Guest, became Directors.

== JG Speedfit Twist & Lock® Fittings ==
In 1974, Guest invented the ‘Super Speedfit’ tube connector concept. The new product reduced assembly times to a few seconds with an instant tube-coupling system, which needed no tools for putting together or disconnecting. The original fittings had brass collets and zinc or brass bodies. The current speedfit range mainly incorporates plastic fittings and plastic collets but still maintains the stainless steel teeth, an essential part of the collet design.

== Underfloor Heating ==
John Guest manufactures Underfloor heating (UFH) products and is a member of the Underfloor Heating Manufacturers Association in the UK.
