= Otter Dock =

Former arm of the Grand Junction Canal in Yiewsley, United Kingdom

Coordinates: 51.5127°N 0.4694°W

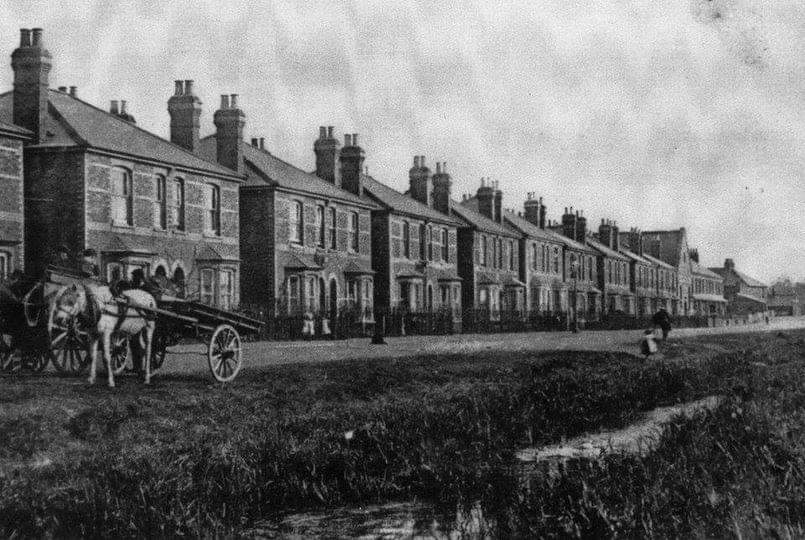
- Interactive map of Otter Dock

Specifications
- Length: 1.0 mile (1.6 km)
- Status: Filled in

History
- Construction began: 1818
- Date completed: 1820
- Date closed: North of Horton Road - 1909; South of Horton Road - Late 20th Century

Geography
- Connects to: Grand Junction Canal; Grand Union Canal

Otter Dock was a branch of the Grand Junction Canal (renamed Grand Union Canal from 1929) in Yiewsley, Middlesex.

In March 1818, permission was obtained from the Grand Junction Canal Company by a Mr John Mills for a dock to be built to service Yiewsley's brickmaking industry. Otter Dock would be the longest of nine arms and docks that served Yiewsley's industries. It was opened in 1820 and after several expansions extended 1,200 yards (0.7 of a mile /1.1 km) north from the mainline of the canal. With the inclusion of the arms within Otter dock, its total length was 1845 yards (1.05 miles /1.68 km).

Through the nineteenth century brick-earth was moulded and fired in clamp kilns within Yiewsley's brickfields with the finished bricks being transported via the Otter Dock and the Grand Junction Canal Paddington Arm to the South Wharf in the Paddington Basin and also to wharves situated along the Regent's Canal and to other locations along the canal and the River Thames. The bricks were then used in the construction of 19th-century London.

| Grand Junction Canal arms and docks in Yiewsley Parish and Yiewsley (and West Drayton) Urban District (west to east) | Length |
|---|---|
| Yiewsley or Onslow Mills Dock | 83yds |
| Holland's or Bentinck Dock | 35yds |
| Otter Dock | 1845yds |
| Dutton's, Cooper's or Houghton's Dock | 175yds |
| Liddall's, Eastwood's or Sabey's Dock | 610yds |
| Rutter's Dock | 20yds |
| Stockley Dock | 350yds |
| Wallington's or Dawley Dock | 320yds |
| Pocock's, Broad's or Starveall Dock | 1120yds |

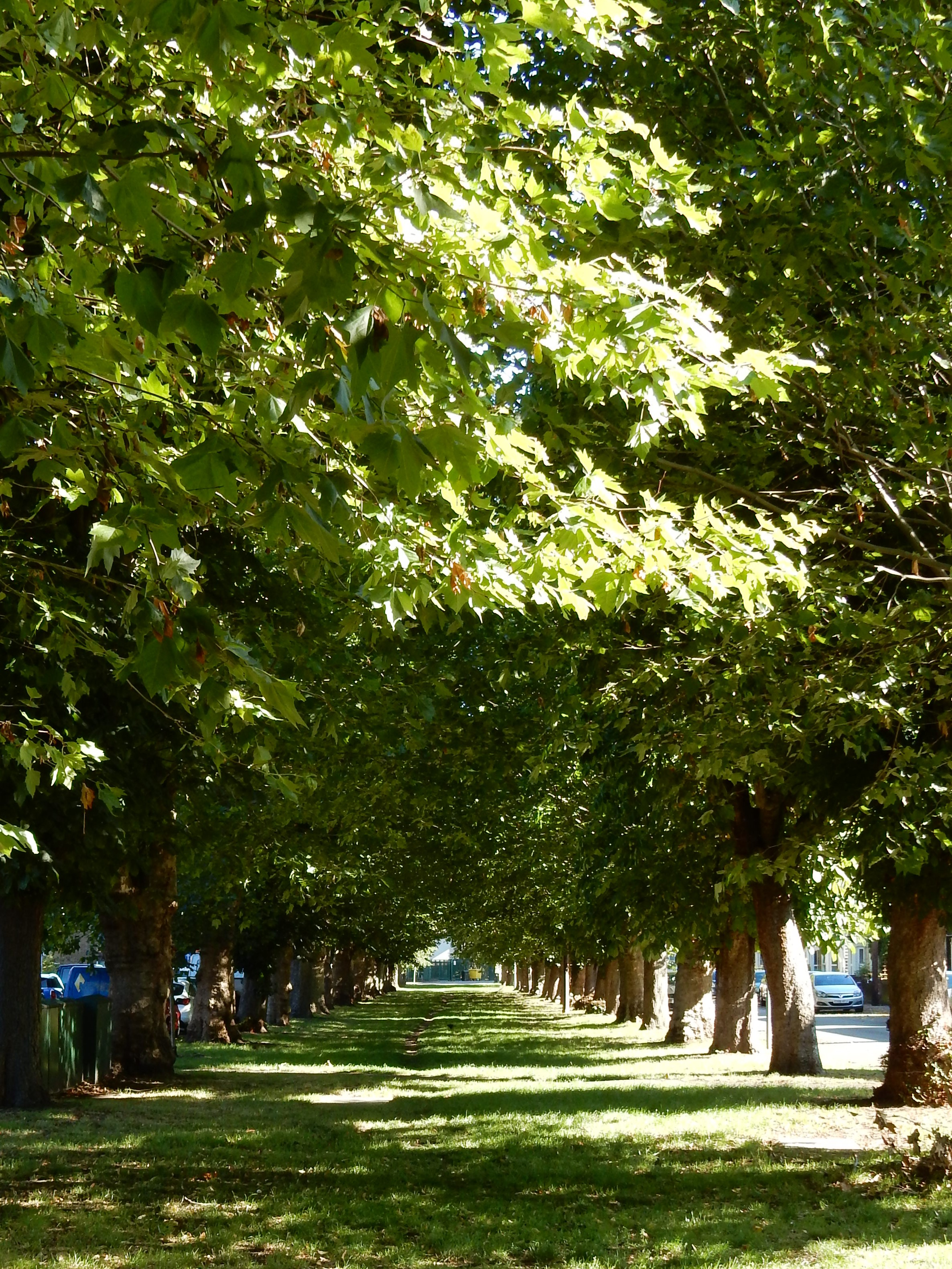
Trees line Royal Avenue, formerly part of the southern section of the Otter Dock

By the end of the century the brickfields and the later gravel pits which the Otter Dock served had been worked out. In July 1906 it was reported that the now disused arm was in an insanitary state and in November 1906 Yiewsley Parish Council were advised to fill the canal in. Because of the number of interested parties filling in Otter Dock north of Horton Road did not began until 1909 and was completed in 1911.

On 17 November 1910 work began on planting 70 chestnut and beech trees along the filled-in canal between Colham Road (known as Wharf or Dock Road until May 1904.) and Ernest Road in the southern section of the former Arm. The trees had been provided by the Metropolitan Public Gardens Association and the planting was completed by the beginning of December. In 1911 Yiewsley council purchased the land for it to be used as a public open space. By October 1911 it had been named Royal Avenue believed to be in honour of the Coronation of King George V and Queen Mary which had taken place on 22 June 1911. However, there had been a drought in the summer of 1911 which caused some of the trees planted in the previous November to die. In the council's surveyor's report of 5 March 1912 it was stated that the planting had taken place of 16 Chestnut and 14 plane trees to replace those trees that had not survived. Colham Road and Ernest Road were renamed Colham Avenue in 1938. The wide boulevard of Poplar Avenue was part of the northern section of the Arm.

South of Horton road Otter Dock remained through much of the 20th Century and was used in the 1930s as a boat repair facility. A water pumping station of the Rickmansworth & Uxbridge Valley Water Works Co was constructed adjacent to the truncated arm. The dock was also used by the Johnson's wax company and by timber merchant James Davies Ltd.

Over time the dock was shortened and in the late twentieth century it was fully filled in. Today the site of the dock is the location of the Knowles Close and Otter Way housing estates.
