= Reliance Worldwide Corporation =

Australian manufacturing company

Reliance Worldwide Corporation Limited
- Company type: Public company
- Traded as: ASX: RWC
- Founded: 1949 in Australia
- Headquarters: Atlanta, Georgia
- Areas served: Global
- Key people: Heath Sharp (CEO); Stuart Crosby (Chairman)
- Revenue: ▲ A$1,162.4 million (2020) (2020)
- Net income: ▼ A$130.3 million (2020)
- Total assets: ▼ A$283.1 million (2020) (2020)
- Number of employees: Over 2,200 (2020)
- Website: www.rwc.com

Reliance Worldwide Corporation is an Australian-owned publicly listed company which designs, manufactures and supplies water flow and control products. It is the world's largest manufacturer of PTC (Push to connect) behind the wall plumbing fittings. The company operates in Australia, New Zealand, Canada, the United States, Spain, France, Italy, India and the United Kingdom. It is administered from its head office in Melbourne, Australia.

== History ==
The company was founded in 1949 in Brisbane, Australia, as a small tool shop. In the 1950s it developed a number of industry firsts: reduction valves, relief valves, pressure vacuum relief valves, pressure reducing and non-return valves. In 1953, RMC unveiled the world's first packaged unvented water heating storage system. By combining pressure reducing and relief valves into a pre-assembled unit, RMC Full Control Valves removed the need for ventilation pipes and ceiling cistern tanks, all but eliminating faulty installations and associated dangers. In 1986, Reliance Machinery Company was acquired by GSA Industries Group, an Australian private investment company. Business continued to grow through ongoing product development. In 2000, RWC acquired Yorkshire Fittings along with its brass plumbing and heating range, York Flex. In 2005, GAS and Ryemetal (a major supplier) amalgamated to form Reliance WorldWide Corporation (Aust). At the same time, the new RWC entered the US market with the acquisition of Cash Acme, the world's largest volume temperature and pressure valve manufacturer. RWC started promoting its name as Reliance Worldwide Corporation at the AHR Expo in the US, to reflect its growing global reach. In 2016 RWC became a publicly listed company on the Australian Securities Exchange and reorganised into three geographical regions –Americas; Asia-Pacific; and Europe, Middle East & Africa.

== Controversies ==
Reliance Worldwide suffered a $970 million plunge in share-market value in February 2020 after a profit downgrade prompted by weak conditions in the UK and Australia.

In the 2020 Annual Report, Chairman Stuart Crosby revealed that, because of disruption caused by the COVID-19 pandemic, 40 per cent of staff in Europe had been sent on leave, Australian staff went to a four-day week and senior executives took a 20 per cent salary cut for two months. This was despite booming business in the U.S.
