= Admiralty Engineering Laboratory =

British naval research laboratory

Department overview
- Formed: 1917
- Preceding Department: Royal Naval Laboratory
- Dissolved: 1977
- Superseding Department: National Gas Turbine Establishment
- Jurisdiction: Government of the United Kingdom
- Headquarters: West Drayton, England
- Parent Department: Admiralty; Navy Department (Ministry of Defence)

The Admiralty Engineering Laboratory was an engineering research department of the British Admiralty from 1917 to 1964 then the Navy Department from 1964 to 1977. Its original work was the design of submarine engines but later to encompass ship engines.

== History ==
In 1915 the Engineer-in-Chief of the Navy communicated to the Board of Invention and Research his recommendations as to the material and design for submarine engines. Following and experimental engine was built to run through research testing and to identify any potential problems. In 1917 a Royal Naval Laboratory was established in South Kensington, London, England under the supervision of Sir Dugald Clerk as its director its name was later changed to the Admiralty Engineering Laboratory.

The research work of the Royal Naval Laboratory was initially shared between two separate departments, the Mechanical Engineering Department established in 1917 and the Electrical Engineering Department created later in 1919. In 1920 they transferred to the Sonic Works in the Yiewsley Urban District and became known as the Admiralty Engineering Laboratory, though collectively a part of the laboratory they remained independent organisations retaining their name and supervised by their own directors. In 1964 overall control of the laboratory was transferred to the Ship Department which was under the supervision of the Director-General Ships at Bath.

In 1972 it was absorbed into the National Gas Turbine Establishment. By 1974 it was a subordinate component of the Directorate-General Research Electronics until it was abolished in 1977. Towards the end of its existence its work focused on research, development, design and testing of electrical systems and machinery and researching on problems related to modern marine propulsion systems.

== Administration ==
Director Admiralty Engineering Laboratory

1. 1917–1919, Sir Dugald Clerk

Superintendent Admiralty Engineering Laboratory

1. 1917–1919, Engineer Commander C. J. Hawkes
2. 1923, Engineer-Commander H. B. Tostevin

Superintendent'

1. 1974–1977, Captain J Hurworth, FI MARE, RN

== Sources ==
1. "Admiralty: Admiralty Engineering Laboratory: Reports, Technical Notes and Memoranda". nationalarchives.gov.uk. The National Archives UK. 1920–1977. Retrieved 6 February 2019.
2. Brown, D. K. (2010). "1 Preparations for War". The Grand Fleet: Warship Design and Development 1906–1922. Barnsley, England: Seaforth Publishing. ISBN 9781783830602.
3. Hackmann, Willem Dirk (1984). Seek & strike : sonar, anti-submarine warfare, and the Royal Navy, 1914–54. London, England: H.M.S.O. ISBN 9780112904236.
4. Smith, G. H. (1975). "Ministry of Defence: Navy Department". The Civil Service Year Book. London: HM Stationery Office. ISBN 0116302151.
