= Jabez Earle =

English Presbyterian minister

Jabez Earle, D.D. (1676?–1768), was an English Presbyterian minister. He had a career of nearly 70 years as a London preacher.

== Career ==
Earle was probably a native of Yorkshire. He was brought up for the ministry by Thomas Brand. In December 1691 he witnessed the funeral of Richard Baxter, and long afterwards told Samuel Palmer, of the Nonconformist's Memorial, that the coaches reached from Merchant Taylors' Hall (whence the body was carried) to Christ Church, Newgate, the place of burial. Next year he became tutor and chaplain in the family of Sir Thomas Roberts, at Glassenbury, near Cranbrook, Kent.

In 1699 Earle became assistant to Thomas Reynolds at the Weighhouse presbyterian chapel, Eastcheap, and soon afterwards became one of the evening lecturers at Lime Street. In 1706 or 1707 he succeeded Glascock as pastor of the presbyterian congregation in Drury Lane, Westminster. In 1708 he joined with four presbyterians and an independent (Thomas Bradbury) in a course of Friday evening lectures at the Weighhouse on the conduct of public religious worship. He increased his congregation, partly by help of a secession from the ministry of Daniel Burgess (1645–1713); and moved it to a new meeting-house in Hanover Street, Long Acre.

At Hanover Street, Earle established a Thursday morning lecture, and maintained it until Christmas 1767. In the Salters' Hall conferences in 1719 Earle was one of the twenty-seven presbyterian subscribers. In 1723 he was elected one of the trustees of Dr. Williams' foundations. On 21 August 1728 the degree of D.D. was conferred upon him by the University of Edinburgh; shortly afterwards the same degree was conferred upon him by King's College, Aberdeen. At this time he held the position of chaplain to the Duke of Douglas (1694–1761).

== Later life ==
In June 1730 Earle was chosen one of the Tuesday lecturers at Salters' Hall, and held this post, in connection with other duties, to the last, in spite of age and blindness; remarking, when his friends pressed him to resign the lectureship, "I am sure you will not choose a better in my stead". In his congregation he had several assistants from 1732, including Benjamin Hollis (d. 11 March 1749), John Allen, M.D. (1749–59), Samuel Morton Savage, D.D. (1759–66), and Rice Harris, D.D., Earle's successor.

Earle was never out of good health, though he once broke his arm, and became blind many years before his death. At the age of 90 he could repeat a hundred lines at any given place from his favourite authors. The hackneyed stories of his jokes relate chiefly to his three wives, whom he called "the world, the flesh, and the devil"; to one of them he explained the difference between exportation and transportation by saying, "If you were exported I should be transported". He preached on the last Sunday of his life, smoking his pipe in the vestry before sermon as usual, and died suddenly in his chair on 29 May 1768, aged 92, or, according to another account, 94 years.

== Works ==
Earle's sermons included:

- Sermon to the Societies for the Reformation of Manners … at Salters' Hall, 26 July, 1704, (dedicated to Sir Thomas Roberts, 4th Baronet).
- Hearing without Doing, 1706 (last sermon at Lime Street lecture).
- Sacramental Exercises, 1707; reprinted, Boston, Mass., 1756; a version in Gaelic, Edinburgh 1827.
- On Prayer and Hearing the Word, 1708 (part of the Weighhouse Friday series; reprinted in Twenty-four Practical Discourses, 1810, 2 vols.).
- Sacred Poems, 1726 (dedication, dated 27 June, to Mrs. Susanna Langford; styles himself "chaplain to his grace the Duke of Douglas").
- Umbritii Cantiani Poemata, 1729 (anon. dated "ex agro Cantiano Cal. Mart. 1729"; a small volume of Latin verse; it contains a poem addressed to Prince Frederick, also elegies on Joseph Addison, Gilbert Burnet, Israel Tonge, and others).

Earle published some twenty other separate sermons, including Ordination Sermon at Newport Pagnell (for William Hunt), 1725; and funeral sermons, for John Cumming, D.D., 1729, Joseph Hayes, 1729, and Alice Hayes, 1733, His last publication seems to have been The Popish Doctrine of Purgatory, 1735; a sermon at Salters' Hall.

In other works, Earle contributed to the Occasional Papers, 1716–19 and translated into Latin treatises by Daniel Williams, for foreign distribution in accordance with the terms of Williams's will. At the end of Matthew Clarke's funeral sermon for Jeremiah Smith, 1723, is Smith's character as attempted in verse by Earle. Andrew Kippis published his facetious lines on the value of degrees in divinity; his lines on the burial service are given in the Evangelical Magazine, ii. 264.
