= John Woodhouse (Nonconformist minister) =

English Presbyterian minister (c.1627–1700)

Reverend John Waterhouse
- Born: c. 1627; Wombourne
- Died: 1700; London
- Education: Trinity College, Cambridge
- Known for: Founder and teacher of Sheriffhales dissenting academy.; Presbyterian writer
- Spouse: Mary Hubbert
- Children: William; George; John; Mary; Two other daughters
- Parents: John Woodhouse (father); Mary Huntbach (mother)

Ecclesiastical career
- Religion: Christianity
- Church: Presbyterian
- Writings: A Sermon Preached at Salters-Hall; Funeral Sermon for Jane Papillon; A Catalogue of Sins
- Congregations: Saxelbye, Leicestershire; Rearsby, Leicestershire; Sheriffhales, Staffordshire; Little St Helen's Church, London

John Woodhouse (c.1627–1700) was a noted English Presbyterian minister and preacher. He founded an dissenting academy at Sheriffhales. His ministry, in the Stuart restoration period and the reign of William III and Mary II, was mostly in the English Midlands, particularly Leicestershire and his native Staffordshire. A moderate Calvinist, he was the author of three extant publications, from the last few years of his life when he was preaching in London.

== Background ==
A drawing of the Wodehouse, published 1898, and thought to be by the architect and designer Charles Robert Ashbee

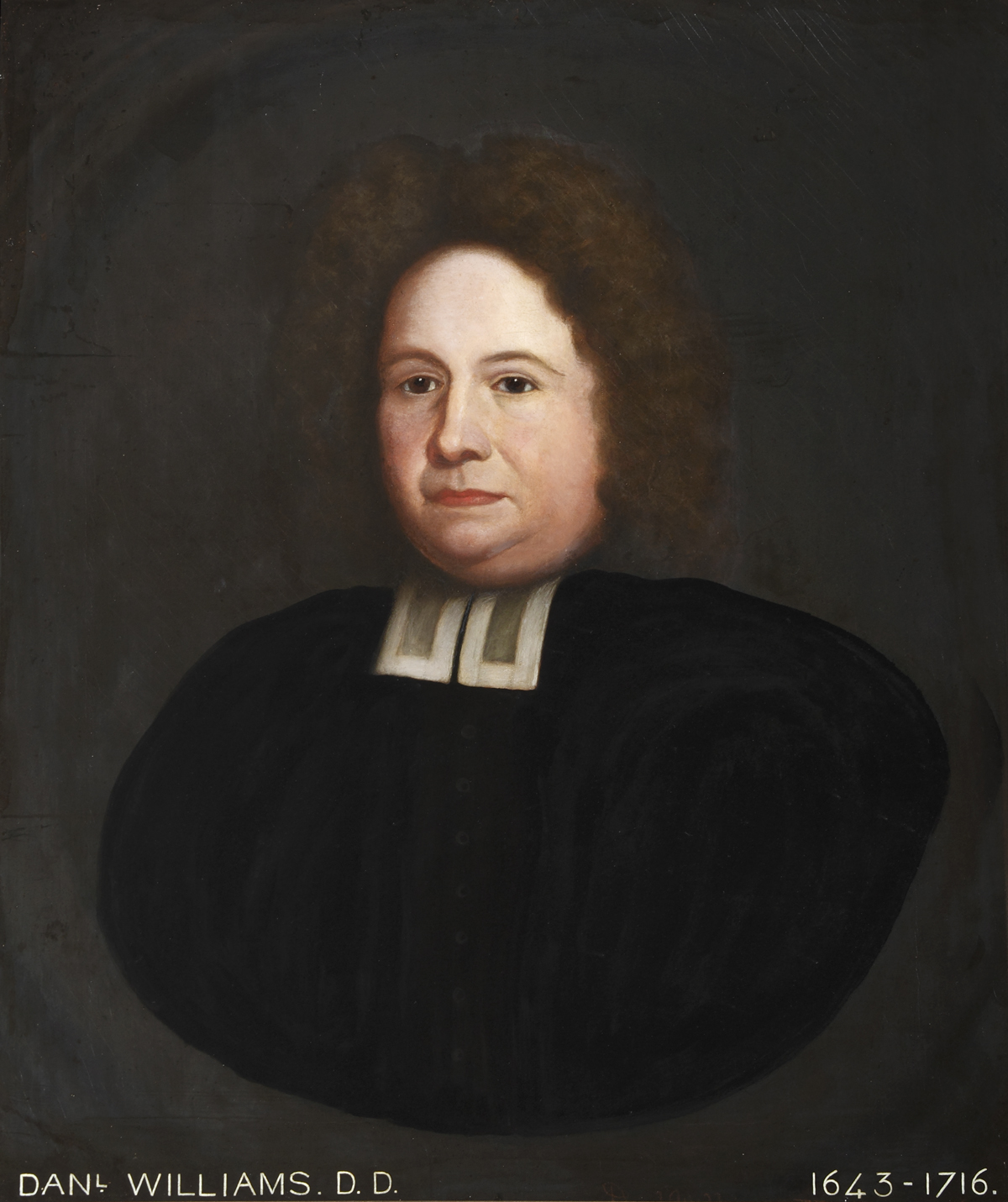
Daniel Williams as represented by Gustavus Ellinthorpe Sintzenich. A Welsh Presbyterian minister and contemporary of Woodhouse, who delivered a sermon at his funeral.

John Woodhouse was possibly the younger son of John Woodhouse of The Wodehouse at Wombourne, Staffordshire, born around 1627. The Victoria County History account of the Wodehouse estate mentions only one plausible candidate for father of the nonconformist minister: a John Woodhouse who died in 1651. It cites the heraldic visitation of the county, 1663–1664, which shows that the older John Woodhouse married Mary Huntbach, who was probably the younger John's mother. He was succeeded by his son eldest son Edward, who was born about 1625. Edward was therefore perhaps the minister's brother. Edward was the first of his family to claim the title of gentleman and it seems to have been his financial ineptitude that led to the Wodehouse ending in the hands of the Hellier family.

Although many basic details are uncertain, Daniel Williams, a fellow dissenting minister who delivered Woodhouse's funeral oration, thought to give a description of his inner life. He portrayed Woodhouse as having a "special talent" for prayer from an early age, and undergoing a conversion experience which "changed his soul."

== Education ==
John Woodhouse's university education has two distinct chronologies, although its location seems unchallenged. The University of Cambridge alumni database has a record of a John Woodhouse, admitted as a pensioner to Trinity College, Cambridge, on 20 January 1661. There is no mention of his graduation. This entry is accepted as referring to the nonconformist minister by Calamy Revised, the updated 20th century version of Edmund Calamy's famous account of ejected and slenced ministers. However, David Wykes, in his ONDB entry on Waterhouse gives the date of his entry to Trinity College as 1655, implying him to be about 28 years of age at that time. Williams said that Woodhouse's disposition was so serious "as to be admitted into the Intimate Society of some of the Gravest Divines in that Place." However, Williams describes Woodhouse as being "but young" when he left university for his first post, which casts considerable doubt on both chronologies for his education.

== Early ministry ==
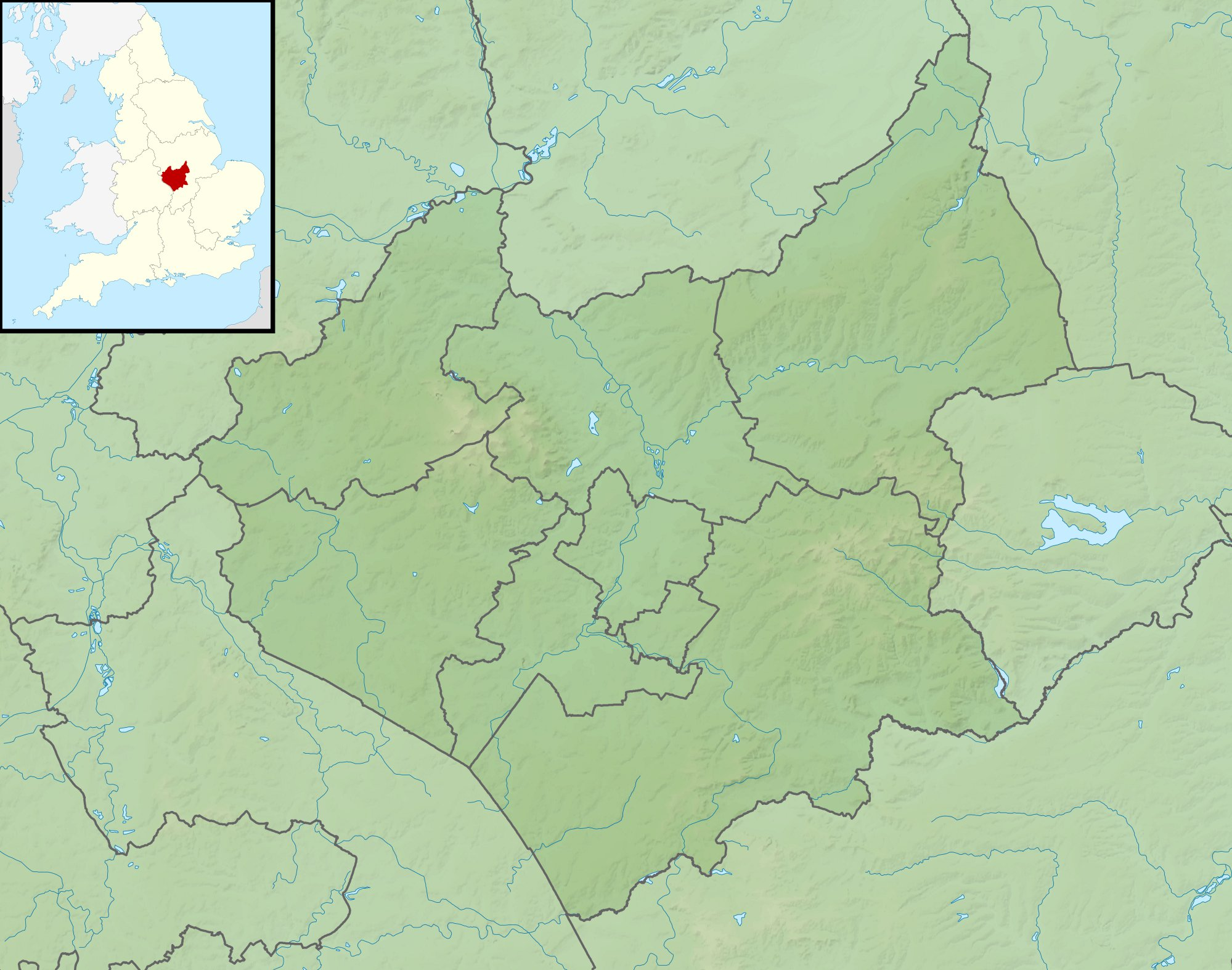
Map of Leicestershire, showing showing some locations of Woodhouse's early ministry.

Probably without graduating, Woodhouse went on to act for some years as a private chaplain to a family, where he gained skill and experience as a tutor. He was apparently a candidate for the ministry in Nottinghamshire but was silenced by the enforcement of the Act of Uniformity 1662, although he was not affected by the Great Ejection which followed, as he had no clerical post to lose. Williams tells us that Woodhouse developed his own distinctive moderate viewpoint within Calvinist theology during this early period of his ministry and that his efforts led to the conversion of some of the family members with whom he worked.

Providence about that time, directed his Acquaintance with a Pious Gentlewoman, under great Doubts and Perplexities of Mind; by her Experience he became instructed, in the various Exercises of a Child of Light, Walking in Darkness; there he found an Instance, what a Godly Person may be reduced to; and how such should be dealt with, in those Self-condenming Fears; which proceed either from Temptation, Weakness of Mind, Bodily Indisposition, or the Hidings of God's Face; yea, sometimes from all together. But as hereby he was prepared, to be a Vessel of Consolation to many, so he became by the Divine Blessing, a Means of Peace to this distressed Person; aſter the long Endeavours of several good Ministers had fail'd to satisfy her.

— Daniel Williams, A Funeral Sermon on the Decease of the Reverend Mr. John Woodhouse, p. 102–103.

Calamy and Wykes agree that Woodhouse then worked for some time as chaplain to Lady Grantham in Nottinghamshire, while the latter adds the details that she lives at Ratcliffe-on-Soar, a Nottinghamshire village close to the borders with both Derbyshire and Leicestershire, and that she died in 1667. It seems that she was Lucy Grantham, whose first husband was Henry Sacheverell of Ratcliffe-on-Soar. She had then married Sir Thomas Grantham in 1625, but he had died as early as 1630, leaving her a widow for more than three decades. Williams stressed the challenge posed by pastoral care in her situation.

On 27 November 1667, probably after the death of Lucy Grantham, Woodhouse married Mary Hubbert at Saxelbye, in Leicestershire. She was the daughter of William Hubbert, a professional soldier who had become a major under George Monck. Williams described her as "a Woman of singular piety, Good Estate, and to Him in all respects agreeable."

In 1669 Woodhouse was reported as resident at Saxelbye in Leicestershire. Working with the former vicar, William Grace, he was preaching on Sundays to a conventicle of about fifty at Saxelbye, and to one of about 20 at Rearsby. The details are slightly misleading. Grace had actually been Rector of Rearsby, but was forced at the Restoration to move back to Shenstone, where he had been vicar previously. Ejected in 1662, after 1665 he moved to Syston, close to Rearsby but sufficiently distant to comply with the Five Mile Act 1665, from which, with Woodhouse's assistance, he ministered to substantial nonconformist rural communities. Williams portrays Woodhouse as developing a ministry of preaching and sick-visiting and credits him with great numbers of conversions in the Vale of Belvoir, so he was very active across a broad sweep of north-east Leicestershire and possibly the neighbouring counties. However, he seems not to have acquired a licence to preach under the Declaration of Indulgence (1672).

In 1675 the Woodhouses were living at Wartnaby when John was licensed by the Archbishop of Canterbury, then Gilbert Sheldon, to teach grammar in the dioceses of Lincoln, Lichfield and Hereford.

== The Sheriffhales Academy ==
=== Disputed dates ===
The precise opening date of the Sheriffhales academy is debatable. Early historians of the dissenting academies tended to favour a very early date, notably Irene Parker who thought it was in operation from 1663 to 1697. Woodhouse's adventures in Leicestershire seem to preclude such an early date. A recent thesis by Mark Burden implies 1675, when Woodhouse received his licence to teach grammar, as the earliest possible date The earliest mention of John and Mary Woodhouse in the Sheriffhales parish register is 12 January 1677, when their son John was baptised by George Plaxton.

=== The manor house ===
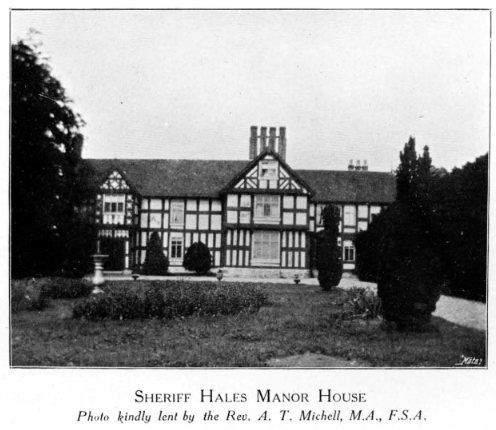
The manor house at Sheriffhales, c. 1900. The photograph was provided by Arthur Michell to the Congregational Historical Society. and shows the building before it was heavily restored in the 1950s.

Shortly afterwards, Woodhouse was conducting his academy in Sheriffhales manor house, a four-bayed structure, just west of the church. which had been built in the late 16th and 17th centuries. Arthur Michell, a later vicar of Sheriffhales described it as "an interesting example of the halftimbered mansions of moderate size, not uncommon in Shropshire," and explained that it had generally been rented out by the lord of the manor. The dating places its construction probably in the time of the admiral Richard Leveson, who rented it to his sister, or possibly a little earlier, in the time of their father, Walter Leveson. In the time of Woodhouse most of the parish of Sheriffhales, including the village, the church and the manor house, was actually in Staffordshire, although a small part was in Shropshire. The whole parish was transferred to Shropshire only in 1895.

The manor house was leased to Woodhouse by William Leveson Gower. The next lessee would move into the manor house on 15 February 1697, which suggests a standard 21-year lease. This was in opposition to the advice of George Plaxton, whom Leveson Gower had presented as Vicar of St Mary's Church, Sheriffhales in 1673, and who hated both nonconformists and leasehold tenure. A friend and former schoolmate of Leveson Gower, Plaxton was not at this point the manager of the estates, as he later became, but he gave advice on the selection of tenants. Twenty years later he wrote to Leveson Gower's son, John, recalling the circumstances;

Your father took me aside and told me that Mr Charleton had brought him an excellent and substantial tenant, and one who would prove a very good neighbour to me, and that he had let to him the manor house and several lands at Sheriff Hales...and I took your father aside and asked him in words to this effect, "Sir do you do or what you have done? You have let your land to a stranger out of you tenants' hands at a very low rate. They will give you more money considerably than he doth.

The "Mr Charleton", who in Plaxton's account obtained the lease for Woodhouse, was Francis Charlton (1639–1698) of Apley Castle. He was the brother of Margaret Baxter, and so the brother-in-law of the great Presbyterian theologian Richard Baxter. Charlton's patronage alone would have been enough for Plaxton to identify Woodhouse as a nonconformist. Charlton was to reappear as an alleged Whig conspirator alongside Woodhouse. If the leasing of the manor house occurred early in 1676 Leveson Gower had already embarked on his career as a Member of the English Parliament, initially as part of the Court party, supporting Charles II. However, his belief in Protestant unity against the largely imaginary Popish Plot would take him over to the opposition and make him a steadfast supporter of Exclusion of James, Duke of York from succession to the throne.

=== Curriculum ===
Burden finds there is no evidence for teaching a university-style curriculum before 1680. This university learning was essential if the nonconformist students were to circumvent the ban on their entry to the two English Universities, which demanded an oath of allegiance to the Church of England. Joshua Toulmin, a radical nonconformist theologian and historian, reported in 1814 on the curriculum followed by Woodhouse, with lectures in logic, anatomy and mathematics, followed by physics, ethics and rhetoric, as well as Greek and Hebrew. Toulmin also claimed that there were more professionally-oriented lectures for those going on to become lawyers or ministers. He stressed that:

Practical exercises accompanied the course of lectures; and the students were employed at times in surveying land, composing almanacks, making sun-dials of different constructions, and dissecting animals.

Toulmin included a lengthy account of the texts generally read and discussed by the students. He cited as his source a manuscript from a John Woodhouse Crompton of Birmingham, which is no longer extant. Irene Parker and other authors largely repeated or condensed Toulmin's account of the curriculum. A contemporary critic of the academy was Thomas Foley who was dissatisfied with Woodhouse's skills in mathematics. However Foley was in revolt at the restrictions imposed by his Puritan father, rejected ethics as a pursuit unsuitable for a gentleman, and grew up to be a Tory squire.

=== Alumni ===
...many of his Pupils are winning Souls, and promoting the Interest of our Blessed Redeemer, whereby the Extent of his Usefulness is beyond my Reach to measure; for the Blessing in it, is like Successively to descend to several Ages.

— Daniel Williams, A Funeral Sermon on the Decease of the Reverend Mr. John Woodhouse, p. 110.

Mark Burden remarks that "From the 1670s it is clear that a major function of the academies was the production of ministers." The Sheriffhales academy educated a large number of future nonconformist clergy. A list derived from the Wilson Manuscripts at New College, Oxford, and printed by the Congregational Historical Society, in alphabetical order, is given below, with minor amendments.

- Benjamin Bennett, Newcastle-on-Tyne: author of The Christian Oratory, etc., died 21 September 1726, aged 52.
- Chewning Blackmore: son of W Blackmore, MA, ejected from St Peter upon Cornhill; minister at Worcester; died 1742
- Richard Carver: minister at Stretton-under-Fosse; still living in 1745.
- Matthew Clark: son of Matthew Clark ejected from Narborough; minister at Miles Lane (a Presbyterian meeting house close to St Michael, Crooked Lane); died 27 March 1726.
- Mr Doughty (name added in another hand at the foot of the list among the Wilson manuscripts.)
- George Flower: domestic chaplain to Philip Foley, afterwards first dissenting minister at Stourbridge; ordained 14 April 1698; died 1 June, 1733, aged 60.
- Daniel Greenwood: minister at West Bromwich, afterwards at Birmingham and Oldbury; died about 1730.
- Jonathan Hand: assistant to Chewning Blackmore at Worcester; ordained 30th May, 1699; died December, 1719.
- ? Hayley; minister at Leominster; died 1719.
- John Newman: minister at Salters' Hall; ordained 20 October 1697; died 25th July 1741.
- John Norris: minister at Welford, Northamptonshire; died 8 February 1738, aged 63.
- Edward Oasland: son of Henry Oasland ejected from Bewdley, minister in the same town; died 1750.
- Samuel Philips: minister at Bromyard; died 1721.
- John Ratcliff: minister at Jamaica Road, Rotherhithe; ordained 1705; died 16 February 1728.
- Benjamin Robinson: ordained at Findern, October 1688; opened a grammar school there; removed to Hungerford 1693, and trained a few students there for the ministry; removed to London 1701, succeeding Mr. Woodhouse at Little St. Helen's; died 30 April, 1724.
- Paul Russel: itinerant in Staffordshire and Worcestershire; associated with work at Coseley, but usually lived at Gnosall.
- Ferdinando Shaw: son of S. Shaw, ejected from Long Whatton, Leicestershire; minister at Derby from 1697; died 1743, aged 72.
- John Southwell: nephew of Richard Southwell, ejected from Baswich, Staffordshire; successively chaplain to Philip. Foley,Esq., assistant to Mr. Woodhouse, schoolmaster at Kidderminster, and minister at Dudley and Newbury, Berkshire, where he died about 1694.
- John Spilsbury: son of J Spilsbury, MA, ejected from Bromsgrove; minister at Kidderminster. He was nephew and executor of Dr. John Hall, who was Bishop of Bristol 1691–1710; died 31 January 1727, aged 60.
- Joseph Stokes: minister at Dudley, 1701-43.
- James Thompson: minister at Bromsgrove from 1699; died 1729.
- William Tong: (also studied under Frankland at Rathmell Academy, then based at Natland); ordained 1687; minister at Knutsford, Chester, Coventry and London; died 21 March 1727, aged 65.
- Robert Travers: native of Laniboy (perhaps Llanboidy), Carmarthenshire; studied also under James Owen at Oswestry; minister at Langdon and Lichfield; ordained 27 September 1692, still living in 1747.
- James Warner: minister at Tewkesbury to 1737, afterwards at Walsall; died 1741.
- John Warren: chaplain to Philip. Foley, Esq., at Prestwood, near Kidderminster; then for nearly fifty years at Coventry, as assistant, co-pastor, and sole pastor; died 1742, aged 70.
- Edward Warren: brother of John Warren; minister at Birdbush, Wiltshire; living in 1736.
- William Willets: minister at Dudley from 1694; died 2 March 1700.
- William Woodhouse: son of John Woodhouse, is not mentioned in the list, but most likely received tuition from his father. He was ordained for Rearsby, Leicestershire, 21 August 1702.

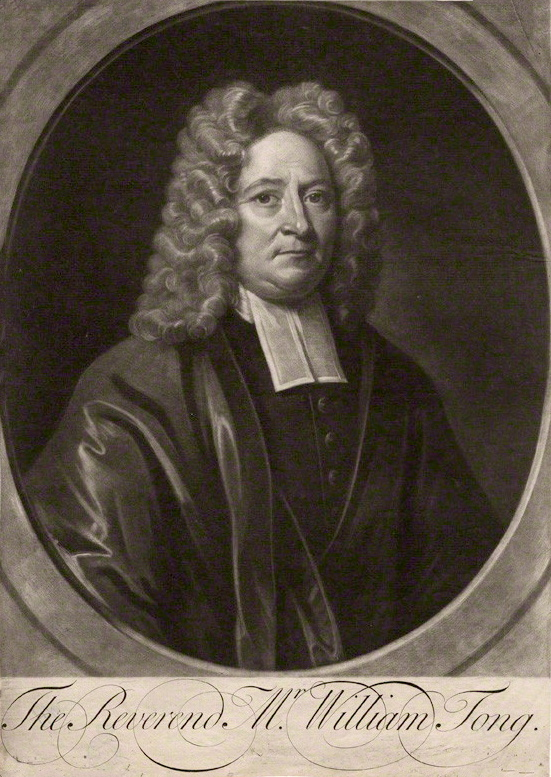
William Tong (1662–1727), an influential Presbyterian minister. Mezzotint print by John Simon after John Wollaston the Elder (1672–1749). National Portrait Gallery: NPG D4370.

The clerical alumni were particularly influential in the Midlands. William Tong and John Warren at Coventry, already had at least 1500 "hearers" when they commenced their ministry, as well as the backing of the corporation. This allowed them to open a large new premises at Smithson Street in 1700, which became known as the "Great Meeting." The Presbyterians remained a major force in Coventry throughout the century, despite a split that led to the opening of a rival meeting house at Vicar Lane and a schism caused by the rise of Unitarianism at the Great Meeting.

Several of Woodhouse's students served as private chaplain to Philip Foley, a Member of Parliament and a wealthy iron-master, who had holdings in Staffordshire, Worcestershire, the Forest of Dean, Nottinghamshire and Derbyshire. Unlike his nephew Thomas, he remained a strong supporter of the cause, retaining Presbyterian chaplains until 1706 and contributing to the "common fund" set up to support nonconformist clergy.

== Persecution ==
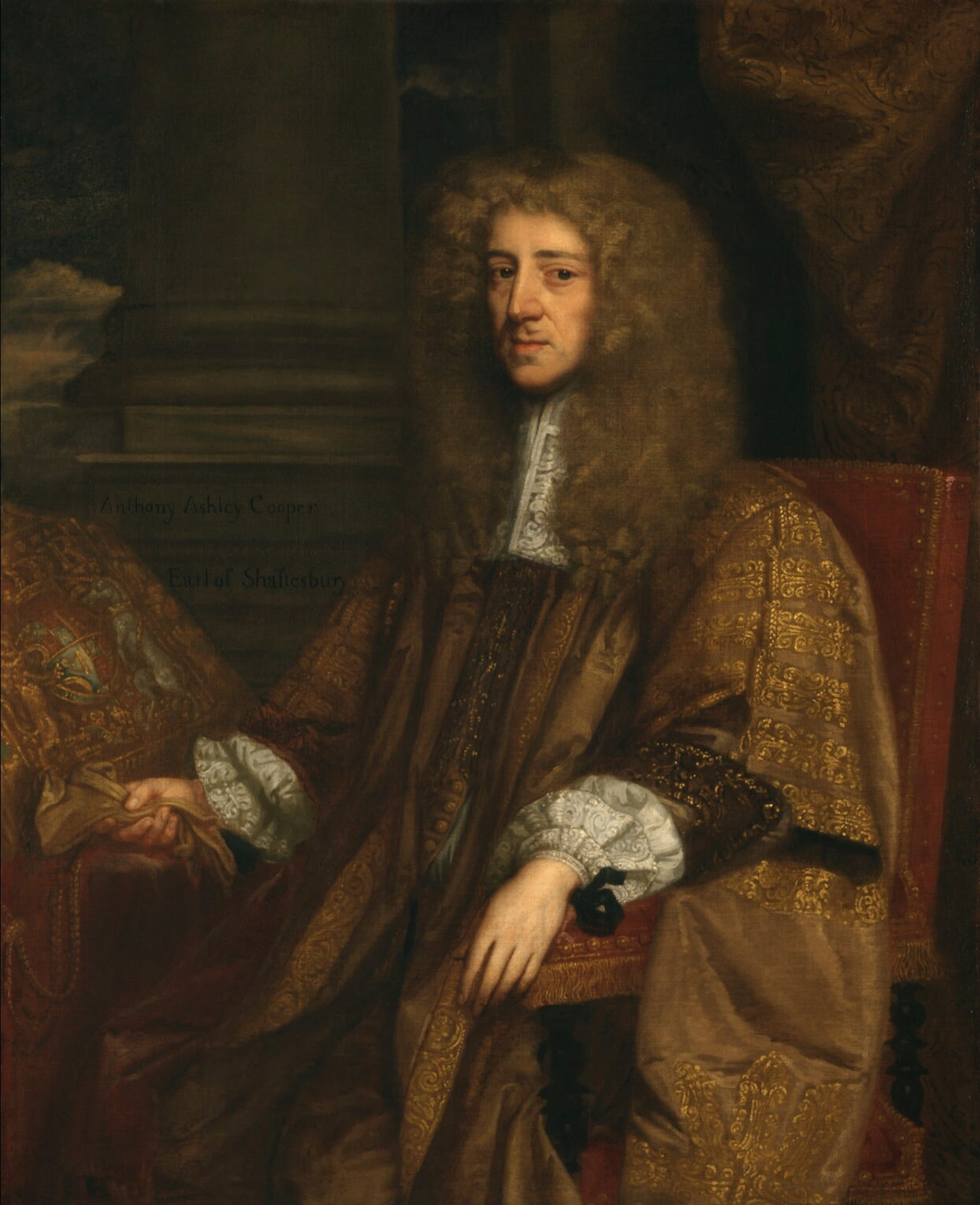
Portrait by John Greenhill of Anthony Ashley-Cooper, 1st Earl of Shaftesbury, leader of the Whig opposition.

James Scott, Duke of Monmouth and Buccleuch, circa 1683. Possibly after Willem Wissing. NPG 151. © National Portrait Gallery, London.

The Trial of William, Lord Russell, in 1683 by Sir George Hayter, painted in 1825.

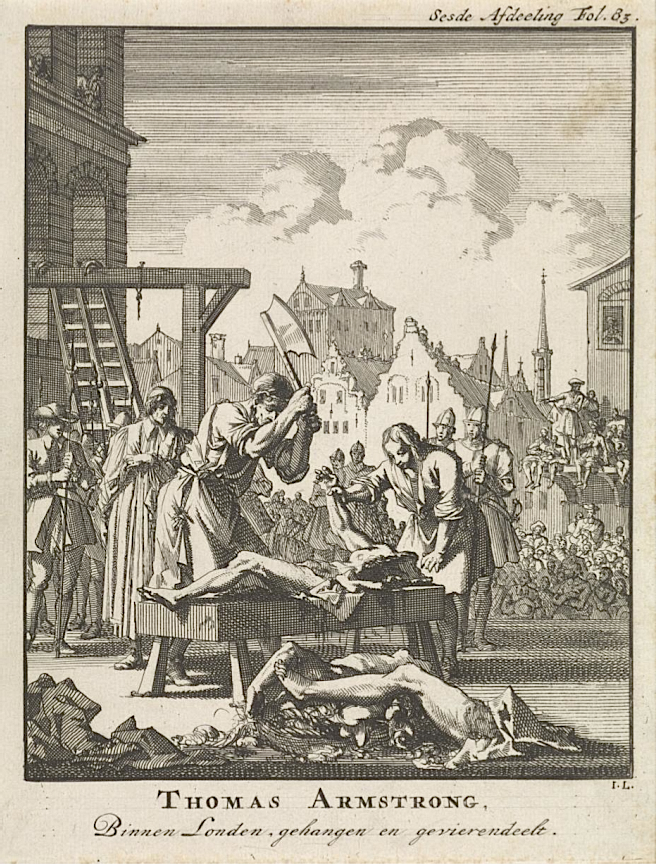
Engraving attributed to Jan Luyken depicting the execution of Sir Thomas Armstrong in 1684.

Student discontent was the least of Woodhouse's problems. He was sucked into the whirlpool of spying and rumour that stemmed from the discovery of the Rye House Plot in June 1683. In early July he was questioned on his activities of the two previous years. He admitted he had met Monmouth, the Whig candidate for the succession, but claimed it was on behalf of a soldier friend about his pay arrears: plausibly, this might refer to George Hubbert, his brother-in-law, who died the following year. He also admitted he knew some of the usual suspects, particularly Francis Charlton of Apley Castle, who had helped him obtain the lease for the academy building, and Robert Ferguson, a Scottish Presbyterian minister who acted as envoy for the Whig magnate Shaftesbury. He went so far as to admit he had heard of limited arms purchases, but his acquaintance with principal plotters, like Lord Russell and Sir Thomas Armstrong, both later to be executed, was limited to no more than two hours in each case. Subsequently, an informer reported arms purchases by William Forester, the MP for Much Wenlock, Leveson Gower, Lord Brandon and others but, when asked about a planned uprising, claimed that "Mr Woodhouse of Sheriff Hales is the likeliest man to be privy to such design."

Allegations continued to pursue Woodhouse. On 22 October a correspondent in Leicester alleged that Woodhouse attended a meeting of dissidents at Wanlip Hall, home of the Palmer family, accompanied by Clement Needham a Presbyterian army officer from Saxeby. He claimed that "Woodhouse was a creature of Lord Shaftesbury's and the man that brought, as is supposed, Mr Charlton into his present circumstances." By this time Charlton was imprisoned in the Tower of London.

In October George Plaxton, the vicar, sent a damning letter about Woodhouse to George Weld, a deputy lieutenant of Shropshire. It soon landed, as Plaxton intended intended, on the desk of Leoline Jenkins, Secretary of State, and head of the government spy network. Plaxton requested that Woodhouse's licence to teach be revoked, "for under colour of it he vends his counterfeit wares and traffics in faction."

Shortly after a series of court appearances and imprisonments began. Woodhouse was served with a capias writ, an arrest warrant sent to the King's Bench ordering detention in cases of excommunication. He successfully appealed against this, obtaining a Prohibition in the King's Bench on November 1683, as the prosecution had falsely claimed he had refused to pay court fees.< A further capias writ on 20 October 1684 led to Woodhouse's imprisonment at Shrewsbury. The Puritan minister and diarist Roger Morrice gave a first-hand report of Woodhouse's appeal, which took the form of his solicitor, Mr Williams, moving a writ de cautione admittenda in the Court of Chancery on 31 October. This was in effect a means of enlisting the secular power, exercised by the King through his courts, against the Church and its unaccountable power of excommunication. It was contested by Dr Richard Raines, the Chancellor of the Diocese of Lichfield, who adopted a studiedly neutral stance in his work. According to Morrice's account, the succession of events was farcical, with both sides missing appointments or being unavailable at relevant times, while Morrice himself tried to hasten proceedings by reminding Williams to pay any outstanding legal bills. Ultimately the writ was never properly lodged and Woodhouse remained for some time in prison.

The Monmouth Rebellion against James VII and II began in the south-west in June 1685 but triggered repression throughout the country. Woodhouse was imprisoned at Chester Castle in July, along with three Shropshire dissidents, whom Morrice grouped with him, perhaps believing Woodhouse also to be from Shropshire, although Sheriffhales was then in Staffordshire.

== Later years ==
Woodhouse's circumstances later eased. In 1684, as the worst period of persecution began, he and Mary had greatly benefited financially when George Hubbert, her brother, died without issue, leaving his fortune to them. This seems to have left them without financial concerns. In the reign of William III and Mary II, the Toleration Act removed legal penalties from Protestant nonconformists, although not the barriers to higher education.

A Presbyterian survey, conducted around 1690, records that Woodhouse was still working at his academy in the manor house and that he "preached to his pupils and some few neighbours but never was a publick minister." He was assisted by John Doughty, who was possibly the son of Samuel Doughty, the ejected Rector of Sibson, Leicestershire. The name Doughty also appears in a list of Woodhouses pupils who became Presbyterian ministers (see above), so he was perhaps a pupil who deputised for him. Samuel Beresford was a Presbyterian minister who occasionally preached for Woodhouse. He was a Shrewsbury man who had been ejected from his living at St Werburgh's, Derby, in 1662 and had since lived at Shifnal and with Sir Thomas Wilbraham at Weston under Lizard.

The parish register records the marriage of Woodhouse's daughter, Mary, to a minister named Oliver Cromwell on 3 June 1691. The Woodhouse family is never mentioned in the register after this.

Plaxton wrote to John Leveson Gower on 30 December 1695, denouncing Woodhouse for allowing farm buildings to fall into disrepair and damaging the woodland attached to the manor, although he also vented his spleen at Woodhouse's nonconformity: "the keeping of a schismatical host in your house were enough to turn a man's stomach against such a tenant if none of the former objections came into the scales against him."

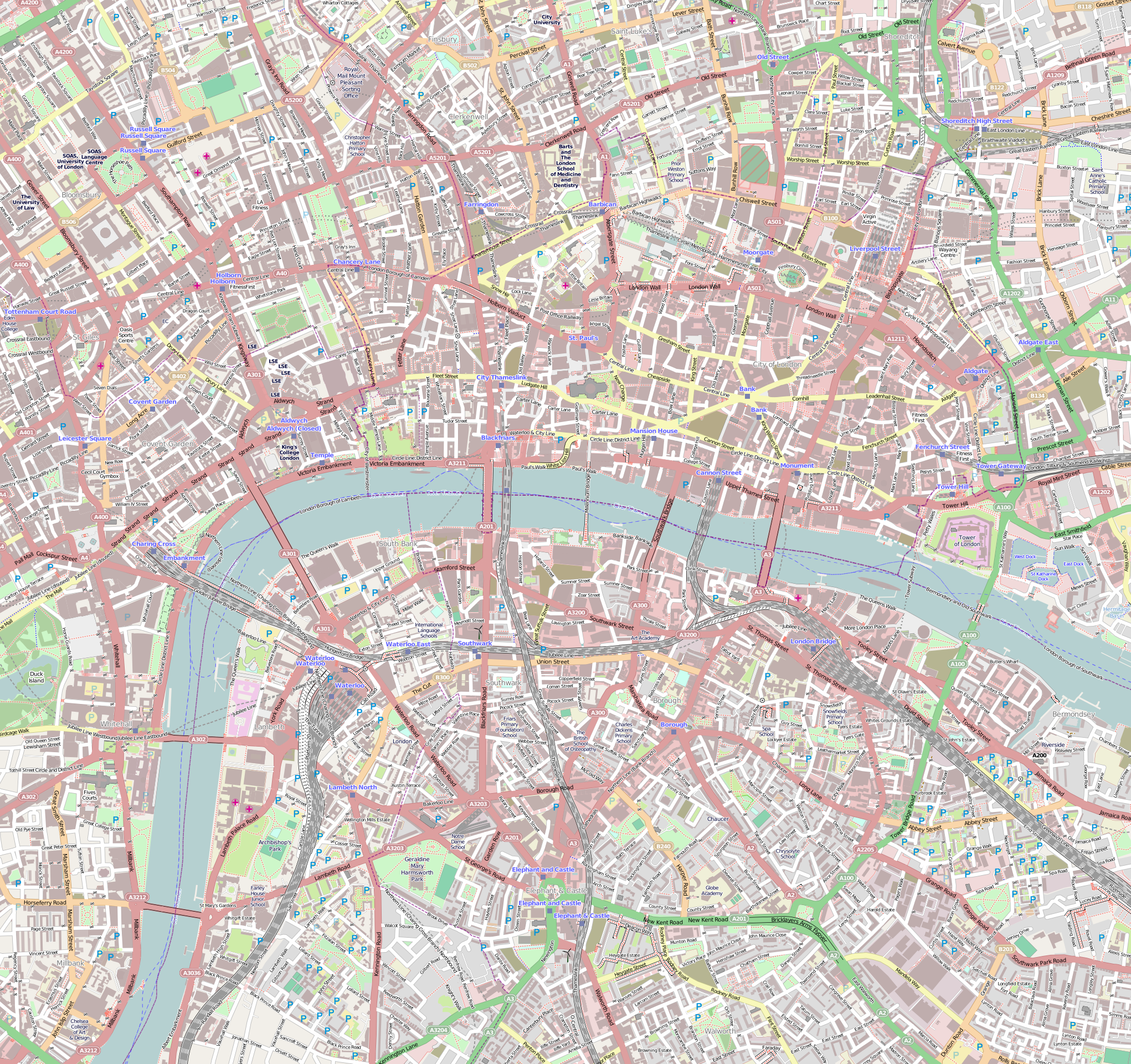
Map of East Central London, illustrating John Woodhouse's last years of ministry.

Woodhouse closed the academy in 1696 or early 1697 because of deteriorating health. Williams said that he worked at the academy until "a great Distemper enfeebled him." Rev Edward Aston, Rector of Kemberton, took out a lease of the manor house on 15 February 1697. Daniel Williams testified that the invitation to preach in London arrived within a few days of the closure of the academy.

According to the entry on him in Calamy Revised, Woodhouse preached at Little St Helen's Church, London as successor to Samuel Annesley, which seems impossible, as St Helen's was a Church of England parish church. The same publication, however, in its entry for Annesley, locates his post as a preacher at a meeting house in what became St Helen's Place, which is slightly north of the church. This is likely to be where Woodhouse ministered for his final years. His known activities and contacts in this period were highly concentrated in a small area on the eastern side of the City of London, although his will shows him to have resided in the parish of St Paul's Church, Shadwell, an area with close maritime connections a short distance East of the City.

== Writings ==
Woodhouse's published writings all date from his last years in London.

=== A Sermon Preached at Salters-Hall ===
A Sermon Preached at Salters-Hall, to the Societies for Reformation of Manners was published 1697, the title itself explaining the occasion. The original sermon had been delivered on 31 May of that year. In his preface Woodhouse makes clear that he was preaching frequently at this time and that this sermon was one of three he preached in less than thirty hours. The audience was made up London and Westminster members of the Society for the Reformation of Manners, which was mainly concerned with the suppression of lewdness and prostitution, at least in public. Woodhouse, however, took a much broader view in the sermon, which is entitled "A Call to Reformation." He referred to the work of the Society as "this narrower Reformation you have so happily set a going." Speaking on a text from the prophet Haggai,, his considerations took on an eschatological perspective and a political focus. He denounced the corruption of the Court under Charles I and Charles II as the root of public immorality. and bemoaned the lack of thoroughness achieved in the English Commonwealth, which he termed "this Revolution," and called for a Reformation of institutions: "We must first settle the Throne, establish the Government, and then reform what was amiss in the Religion and Morals of Men." He also alluded to his own experience under the Stuart Restoration:

they found there was a sort of Persons, (the Remains of the old Puritans) who were not fully of the Way of the Established Church (which they thought wanted a fuller Reformation); who by their Preaching, and Living, gave great Rebuke to what was doing; Ways were found to discourage these Men, Laws procured, Informers encouraged, and many Persons, and Families, ruined.

=== Funeral Sermon for Jane Papillon ===
A Funeral Sermon Occasioned by the Death of Mrs Jane Papillon, was published in 1698, based on a sermon preached on 24 July of that year. The publication was requested by Thomas Papillon, the deceased's husband, a Whig, and an immensely wealthy London merchant and MP of French origins, who attended Huguenot services. The text began:

"And I heard a voice from heaven saying unto me, Write, Blessed are the dead which die in the Lord, from henceforth: Yea, saith the Spirit, that they may rest from their labours; and their works do follow them."

Largely free from explicit political polemic, the sermon demonstrates Woodhouses's command of the Greek text and takes for granted the specifically Calvinist rejection of psychopannychism or Christian mortalism.

=== A Catalogue of Sins ===
A Catalogue of Sins: Highly Useful to Self-Acquaintance, Experimental Prayer; And above all To a Suitable Preparation, for a Worthy Partaking of The Supper of the Lord, was published 1699, the lengthy title aptly describing the contents. It is dedicated to "that Part of Christ's Flock, to which I am more Especially related: Meeting at Little St. Helen's in Bishopsgate-street, London." In the dedication Woodhouse defined his primary responsibility to the congregation as "to undertake the Pastoral Care of your Souls." Woodhouse placed the Eucharist or Lord's Table, which he also called Holy Communion, at the centre of Christian life, calling it "a Priviledge of Unspeakable Benefit." He recommended preparation through regular self-reflection, which he was adamant should be realistically kind as well as comprehensive:

Pass an impartial Judgment on thy self. Let not Self-abhorrence make thee too Severe in thy Censure, or Self-love too favourable. Do not side with Satan to over-look the good that is in thee, do not take part with the Flesh, to over-look the Evil that is in thee. The Word of God is the Measure of Judgment, make that thy Rule, and thou can'st not miss.

Woodhouse's penchant for lists and taxonomies is seen at its fullest in this short work. He considers the implications of original sin, before moving to a more detailed analysis of actual sin, which is analysed according to the commandments against which it offends.

=== Publication ===
All three of Woodhouse's extant works were published by John Lawrence, based in The Poultry in the centre of the City of London. Lawrence was well known as a specialist Presbyterian publisher and was active at least from 1681—1711. He operated from premises by the Poultry Compter, a small local prison for minor miscreants. At least two of the books were printed by the Astwoods, James and his son John, who operated from behind the church of St Christopher le Stocks, which was in Threadneedle Street.

== Death ==
He was tenderly loved by his Relations, and survived neither Will nor Gifts for Service, he took a kind of Solemn Leave in the Sermon he preach'd with his usual Warmth; within a few Day of the Period of his Life. And Mercy followed him in his Death, Exercise of Reason was not intermitted, no, nor Grace neither. He prayed with great Fervour, the Tempter was chained from Disturbing, he was full of Inward Comfort, Gasping he chearfully joined with the Prayers of others, and died without a Groan.

— Daniel Williams, A Funeral Sermon on the Decease of the Reverend Mr. John Woodhouse, p. 110.

John Woodhouse died in October 1700. He was buried in the churchyard at Rearsby, where his son William was minister to a small nonconformist congregation, on 17 October. Williams testified that he was preaching until the last few days of his life, and that he died in full consciousness, although he also thought Woodhouse was intestate, which was certainly untrue.

Woodhouse died a wealthy man, with holdings in Leicestershire, Shropshire, Staffordshire, and Worcestershire. He left bequests to two of his three sons and his three daughters and their husbands: George, the second son, received nothing because of his behaviour. The eldest son, William, was his main heir and carried on his work as a nonconformist minister, while John, the youngest, studied medicine at Leiden University in the Netherlands and graduated on 11 February 1700, before his father's death. His wife Mary was not a beneficiary, so seems to have predeceased him.
