= Benjamin Robinson =

Benjamin or Ben Robinson may refer to:

- Benjamin Robinson (minister) (1666–1724), English Presbyterian minister
- Benjamin Lincoln Robinson (1864–1935), American botanist
- Ben Robinson (archaeologist) (fl. 2000s–present), English archaeologist and television presenter
- Ben Robinson (politician) (fl. 1980s–present), American politician from Oklahoma
