= Augusta De Gruchy =

British novelist and poet active in Jersey (1841–1893)

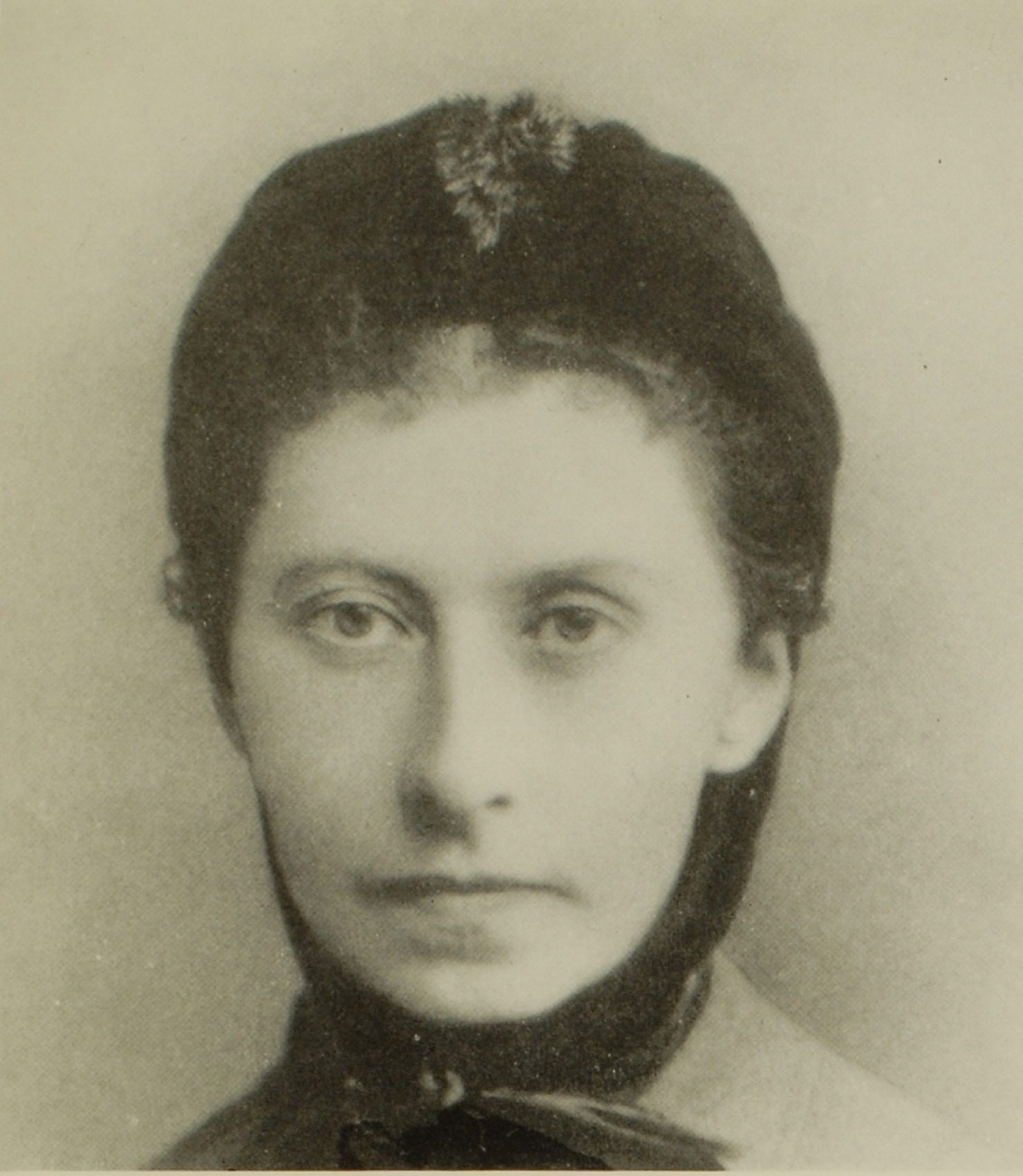
- De Gruchy in 1883
- Born: Augusta Chambers Smith; 6 July 1841 Bedfordshire, England, UKGBI
- Died: 3 March 1893 (aged 51) Beaumont Street, London, UKGBI
- Resting place: St Saviour's Church, Jersey
- Occupation: Novelist; poet
- Spouse: William Lawrence De Gruchy (m. 1864)
- Children: 4

Augusta Chambers De Gruchy (née Smith; 6 July 1841 – 3 March 1893) was a British novelist and poet active in Jersey.

== Biography ==
De Gruchy was born Augusta Chambers Smith on 6 July 1841 in Bedfordshire to Jabez Smith and Charlotte Smith. By 1861, De Gruchy was living with her parents in St Helier, Jersey.

She married William Lawrence De Gruchy in 1864, a draper turned lawyer who served as a mayor and judge in Jersey. They lived in a house called Rochebois with a view of the harbor of Saint Aubin, Jersey. In 1886, the collapse of the Jersey Banking Company forced the family to relocate to London.

De Gruchy published two novels, Lalage (1875), a romance set in Italy, and Octavia's Lovers (1880). Her collection of poetry, Under the Hawthorn (1893) was published posthumously.

In 1894, Gruchy's husband commissioned a stained glass memorial window to be installed in her memory at St Aubin on the Hill. Designed by Edward Burne-Jones in a Pre-Raphaelite style, the window was constructed by the firm of William Morris.

== Personal life ==
De Gruchy had four children. Two died young, a son as a baby and her daughter Violet at age twelve. They also had a daughter, Maud, and a son, Guy, who became Seigneur of Noirmont.

On 3 March 1893, De Gruchy died at a convalescent home on Beaumont Street, London aged 51. De Gruchy was buried at St Saviour's Church, Jersey on 7 March 1893.

== Bibliography ==
- Lalage: A Novel. 1 vol. London: Samuel Tinsley, 1875.
- Octavia's Lovers. 3 vol. London: Samuel Tinsley, 1880.
- Under the Hawthorn and Other Verses. London: Bodley Head, 1893.
