= Thomas Bradbury (minister) =

English dissenting minister

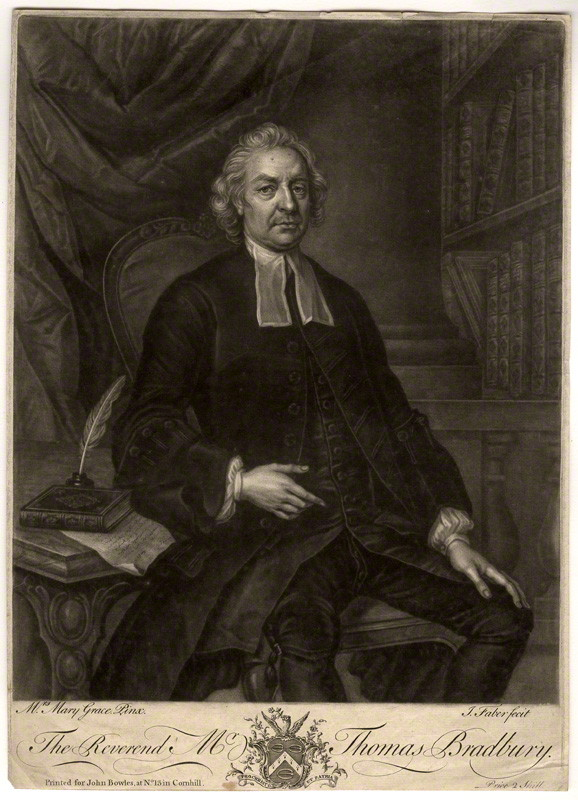
Reverend Thomas Bradbury engraved by John Faber the Younger, after Mary Grace

Thomas Bradbury (1677–1759) was an English Dissenting minister.

== Life ==
Bradbury was born in Yorkshire, and educated for the congregational ministry at Attercliffe Academy; Oliver Heywood gave him books. He preached his first sermon on 14 June 1696, and went to reside as assistant and domestic tutor with Thomas Whitaker, minister of the independent congregation at Call Lane, Leeds. From Leeds, in 1697, Bradbury went to Beverley, as a supply; and in 1699 to Newcastle-on-Tyne, first assisting Richard Gilpin, and then Benjamin Bennet, Gilpin's successor, both presbyterians. It seems that Bradbury expected a co-pastorate, and on William Turner's account his later influence helped split the congregation.

Bradbury went to London in 1704 as an assistant to John Galpin, in the independent congregation at Stepney. On 18 September 1704 he was invited to become colleague with Samuel Wright at Great Yarmouth, but declined. After the death of Benoni Rowe, Bradbury was appointed (16 March 1707) pastor of the independent congregation in New Street, by Fetter Lane. He was ordained 10 July 1707 by ministers of different denominations; his confession of faith on the occasion (which reached a fifth edition in 1729) showed uncompromising Calvinism, expressed entirely in words of scripture. His brother Peter became his assistant. Bradbury took part in the weekly dissenting lectureships, delivering a series at the Weighhouse on the duty of singing (1708), and a sermon before the Societies for Reformation of Morals (1708).

== Political sermons ==
Bradbury boasted of being the first to proclaim George I, which he did on Sunday, 1 August 1714, being apprised, while in his pulpit, of the death of Queen Anne by the agreed signal of a handkerchief. The report was current that he preached from 2 Kings ix. 34, "Go, see now this cursed woman and bury her, for she is a king's daughter"; but perhaps he only quoted the text in conversation. Another story is to the effect that when, on 24 September, the dissenting ministers went in their black gowns with an address to the new king, a courtier asked, "Pray, sir, is this a funeral?" On which Bradbury replied, "Yes, sir, it is the funeral of the Schism Act, and the resurrection of liberty".

Robert Winter, D.D., Bradbury's descendant, is responsible for the statement that there had been a plot to assassinate him, and that the spy who was sent to Fetter Lane was converted by Bradbury's preaching. On the other hand, it is said that Harley had offered to stop his mouth with a bishopric. Bradbury's political harangues were sometimes too violent for men of his own party. Daniel Defoe may be the author of "A Friendly Epistle by way of reproof from one of the people called Quakers, to T. B., a dealer in many words", 1715, 8vo (two editions in same year).

== The Salters' Hall controversy ==
With the reference of the Exeter controversy to the judgment of the dissenting ministers of London, a large part of Bradbury's vehemence passed from the sphere of politics to that of theology. The origin of the dispute arose during the life of James Peirce (1674–1726), an intellectual leader of dissent against the positions of Edward Wells and William Nicholls. Peirce, the minister of James's Meeting, Exeter, was accused, along with others, of favouring Arianism. The Western Assembly was disposed to salve the matter over by admitting the orthodoxy of the declarations of faith made by the parties in September 1718. But the body of thirteen trustees who held the property of the four Exeter meeting-houses appealed to London for further advice. After much negotiation the whole body of London dissenting ministers of the three denominations was convened at Salters' Hall to consider a draft letter of advice to Exeter. Bradbury put himself in the front of the conservative party; the real mover on the opposite side was the whig politician John Shute Barrington, viscount Barrington, a member of Bradbury's congregation, and later the "Papinian" of Nathaniel Lardner's Letter on the Logos (1759).

The conference met on Thursday, 19 February 1719 (the day after the royal assent to the repeal of the Schism Act), when Bradbury proposed that, after days of fasting and prayer, a deputation should be sent to Exeter to offer advice on the spot; this was negatived. At the second meeting, Tuesday, 24 February, Bradbury moved a preamble to the letter of advice, embodying a declaration of the orthodoxy of the conference, in words taken from the Assembly's catechism. This was rejected by fifty-seven to fifty-three. Sir Joseph Jekyll witnessed the scene and once said "The Bible carried it by four". At the third meeting, 3 March, the proposition was renewed, but the moderator, Joshua Oldfield, would not take a second vote. Over sixty ministers went up into the gallery and subscribed a declaration of adherence to the first Anglican article, and the fifth and sixth answers of the Assembly's catechism. They then left the place amid hisses, Bradbury exclaiming "'Tis the voice of the serpent, and may be expected against a zeal for the seed of the woman". Principal John Chalmers, of King's College, Old Aberdeen, who was present at the third meeting, and in sympathy with Bradbury's side, reported to Edmund Calamy that he had never seen nor heard of such strange conduct and management.

The non-subscribing majority, to the number of seventy-three, met again at Salters' Hall on 10 March, and agreed on their advice, which was sent to Exeter on 17 March. Bradbury and his subscribers (61, 63, or 69) met separately on 9 March, and sent off their advice on 7 April. Apart from the preamble the two advices are almost identical; and the letter accompanying the nonsubscribers' advice declares their ‘sincere belief in the doctrine of the blessed Trinity and the proper divinity of our Lord Jesus Christ, which they apprehend to be clearly revealed in the Holy Scriptures.’ Both advices preach peace and charity, while supporting the duty of congregations to withdraw from ministers who teach what they deem to be serious error.

The Exeter trustees had taken the matter into their own hands by formally excluding Peirce and his colleague from all the meeting-houses. Bradbury had his share in the ensuing pamphlet war, which was political as well as religious, for a schism in dissent was deprecated as inimical to the Whig interest.

Barrington left Bradbury's congregation, and joined that of Jeremiah Hunt, D.D., independent minister and non-subscriber, at Pinners' Hall. Bradbury was brought to book by "a Dissenting Layman" in Christian Liberty asserted, in opposition to Protestant Popery, 1719, a letter addressed to him by name, and answered by "a Gentleman of Exon", in A Modest Apology for Mr. T. Bradbury, 1719. But most of the pamphleteers passed him by as an angry man, to aim at William Tong, Benjamin Robinson, Jeremiah Smith, and Thomas Reynolds, four presbyterian ministers who had issued a whip for the Salters' Hall conference in the subscribing interest, and who subsequently published a joint defence of the doctrine of the Trinity.

In 1720, an attempt was made to oust Bradbury from the Pinners' Hall lectureship; in the same year he started an anti-Arian Wednesday lecture at Fetter Lane. This did not improve matters. There appeared ‘An Appeal to the Dissenting Ministers, occasioned by the Behaviour of Mr. Thomas Bradbury,’ 1722; and Thomas Morgan (the ‘Moral Philosopher,’ 1737), who had made an unusually orthodox confession at his ordination in 1716, but was now on his way to ‘Christian deism,’ wrote his ‘Absurdity of opposing Faith to Reason’ in reply to Bradbury's 5 November sermon, 1722, on ‘The Nature of Faith.’ He had previously attacked Bradbury in a postscript to his ‘Nature and Consequences of Enthusiasm,’ 1719.

== Later life ==
Returning to a former topic, Bradbury published in 1724, The Power of Christ over Plagues and Health, prefixing an account of the anti-Arian lectureship. He published also The Mystery of Godliness considered, 1726, 2 vols. (sixty-one sermons, reprinted Edinburgh 1795). In 1728 his position at Fetter Lane became uncomfortable; he left, taking with him his brother Peter, now his colleague, and most of his flock.

The presbyterian meeting-house in New Court, Carey Street, Lincoln's Inn Fields, was vacant through the removal of James Wood (a subscriber) to the Weighhouse in 1727; Bradbury was asked, 20 October 1728, to New Court, and accepted on condition that the congregation would take in the Fetter Lane seceders and join the independents. This arrangement, which has helped to create the false impression that at Salters' Hall the presbyterians and independents took opposite sides as denominations, was made 27 November 1728, Peter continuing as his brother's colleague (he probably died about 1730, as Jacob Fowler succeeded him in 1731). Bradbury now published Jesus Christ the Brightness of Glory, 1729, (four sermons on Hebrews i. 3); and a tract On the Repeal of the Test Acts, 1732. His last publication seems to have been Joy in Heaven and Justice on Earth, 1747, (two sermons), unless his discourses on baptism, from which Caleb Fleming drew The Character of the Rev. Tho. Bradbury, taken from his own pen, 1749, are later. He was an effective as well as an unconventional preacher; the lampoon (about 1730) in the Blackmore papers is evidence of his "melodious" voice, his "head uplifted", and his "dancing hands".

== Death and family ==
Bradbury died on Sunday, 9 September 1759, and was buried at Bunhill Fields burial ground. His wife's name was Richmond. He left two daughters, one married (1744) to John Winter, brother to Richard Winter, who succeeded Bradbury, and father to Robert Winter, D.D., who succeeded Richard; the other daughter married (1768) George Welch, a banker. Besides the publications noticed above, Bradbury printed several funeral and other sermons, including two on the death of Robert Bragge (died 1738; "eternal Bragge" of Lime Street, who preached for four months on Joseph's coat).

== Works ==
Bradbury's Works, 1762, 3 vols. (second edition 1772) consist of 54 sermons, mainly political. They attracted attention by their style and titles. Among them were:

- The Son of Tabeal [Is. vii. 5–7] on occasion of the French invasion in favour of the Pretender, 1708 (four editions);
- The Divine Right of the Revolution [1 Chron. xii. 23], 1709;
- Theocracy; the Government of the Judges applied to the Revolution [Jud. ii. 18], 1712;
- Steadiness in Religion … the example of Daniel under the Decree of Darius, 1712;
- The Ass or the Serpent; Issachar and Dan compared in their regard for civil liberty [Gen. xlix. 14–18], 1712 (a 5 November sermon, it was reprinted at Boston, U.S., in 1768);
- The Lawfulness of resisting Tyrants, &c. [1 Chron. xii. 16–18], 1714 (5 Nov. 1713, four editions);
- Eikon basilike, the image of the Kingdom "Eἰκὼν Bασιλικὴ; a sermon [Hos. vii. 7]" preached 29 May, with Appendix of papers relating to the Restoration, 1660, and the present settlement,’ 1715;
- Non-resistance without Priestcraft [Rom. xiii. 2], 1715 (5 Nov.);
- The Establishment of the Kingdom in the hand of Solomon, applied to the Revolution and the Reign of King George [1 K. ii. 46], 1716 (5 Nov.);
- The Divine Right of Kings inquired into [Prov. viii. 15], 1718;
- The Primitive Tories; or … Persecution, Rebellion, and Priestcraft [Jude 11], 1718 (four editions).
