= Mary Grace =

British artist (died 1799/1800)

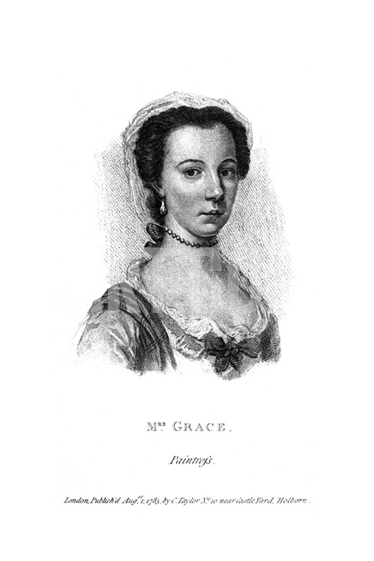
- Died: 1799/1800

Mary Grace (died 1799/1800) was a British self-taught professional portrait painter and copyist in the 18th century.

== Life ==
Mary Hodgkiss' father was a shoemaker, so her skill as a painter is thought to be self-taught, although she may have had some assistance from Stephen Slaughter. She married Thomas Grace in 1744 in London.

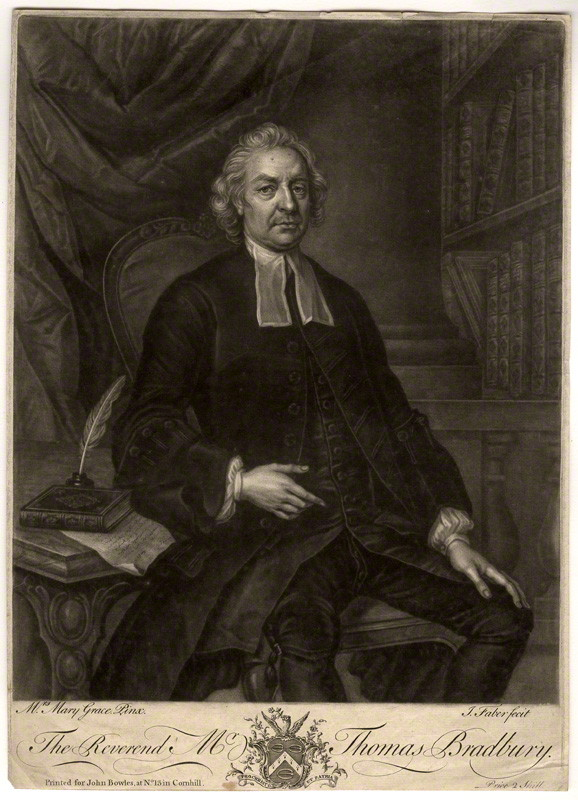
Reverend Thomas Bradbury after Grace

In 1749 a painting by her of the Reverend Thomas Bradbury was published after it was engraved by John Faber. The National Portrait Gallery has copies of this print and another, again after Mary Grace, of Thomas Bradbury, but engraved by Jonathan Spilsbury. Grace exhibited her own compositions at the Society of Artists of Great Britain every year from 1762 to 1769, and also obtained work copying other images. Grace was elected as an honorary member of the Incorporated Society of Artists in 1769. She was described in a contemporary publication, The Artists' Repository (1770–1780), as "responsible for many portraits 'whose management, as well as likeness, do her great honour'." As well as portraits, she exhibited paintings of historical and classical scenes (e.g. The Death of Sigismunda (1765), Antigonous, Seleucus and Stratonice (1767)), and contemporary scenes such as Beggars (1763) and Pea-Pickers Cooking Their Supper (1764). To date, these are known only from descriptions in the Society of Artists' exhibition catalogues.

In about 1770 Thomas Grace died leaving property in Hackney, but Mary Grace had other property by 1799 or 1800, as she died at Weymouth Street in Marylebone leaving £1300. In 1785 her own self-portrait was engraved and published. The original of this self-portrait, the only known surviving painting by Grace, is in the collection of the Santa Barbara Museum of Art and was shown in an exhibition of British women artists at the Tate Britain in 2024.
