= Thomas Brand (minister) =

English minister

Thomas Brand (1635–1691) was an English nonconformist minister and divine.

== Life ==
Brand was the son of the rector of Leaden Roothing, Essex. He was educated at Bishop's Stortford, Hertfordshire, and Merton College, Oxford. There he studied law, and later entered the Temple.

An acquaintance with Samuel Annesley led Brand to decide to join the ministry. He entered the family of the Lady Dowager Roberts of Glassenbury, Kent, the education of whose four children he superintended. He caused the whole of his salary to be devoted to charity. He soon preached twice every Sunday, and frequently a third time in the evening, at a place two miles distant. He established weekly lectures at several places, and monthly fasts. On the death of the Rev. Mr. Poyntel of Staplehurst, he left Lady Roberts, went to Staplehurst, and was ordained. About two years later he married a widow, by whom he had several children, who all died young.

He continued at Staplehurst until driven away by persecution. After wanderings he settled near London. He built many meeting-houses, and contributed to their ministers' salaries. He gave away thousands of catechisms and other books, and reprinted twenty thousand of Joseph Alleine's Treatise on Conversion to be given away, altering the title to a Guide to Heaven. He and his friends sold bibles under cost price to all who desired them, provided they did not sell them again. Brand supported children of poor parents, and put them to trades. Jabez Earle, minister of the presbyterian congregation in Hanover Street, London, was one of his protégés. Brand said he ‘would not sell his estate because it was entailed, but he would squeeze it as long as he lived.’

Brand died 1 December 1691, and was buried in Bunhill Fields.
