= Jeremiah Smith (clergyman) =

English Presbyterian minister (died 1723)

Jeremiah Smith (died 1723), divine, was minister of a congregation at Andover, Hampshire, and in 1708 became co-pastor with Samuel Rosewell of the Silver Street Presbyterian Chapel, London. He took a prominent part in the Salters' Hall debates in 1719 concerning the Trinity, and was one of four London ministers who wrote The Doctrine of the Ever Blessed Trinity stated and defended. He was the author of the portion relating to the Epistle to Titus and the Epistle to Philemon in the continuation of Matthew Henry's ‘Exposition,’ and published, with other discourses, funeral sermons on Sir Thomas Abney (1722) and Samuel Rosewell (1723). He died on 20 August 1723, aged nearly seventy.

Matthew Clarke preached and published a funeral sermon.

== See also ==
- Benjamin Robinson, one of the other authors of The Doctrine of the Ever Blessed Trinity stated and defended.

== Sources ==
This article incorporates text from a publication now in the public domain: Lee, Sidney, ed. (1898). "Smith, Jeremiah (d.1723)". Dictionary of National Biography. Vol. 53. London: Smith, Elder & Co.
