= Beaumont Street, London =

Street in the City of Westminster, London

Coordinates: 51.5206°N 0.1504°W

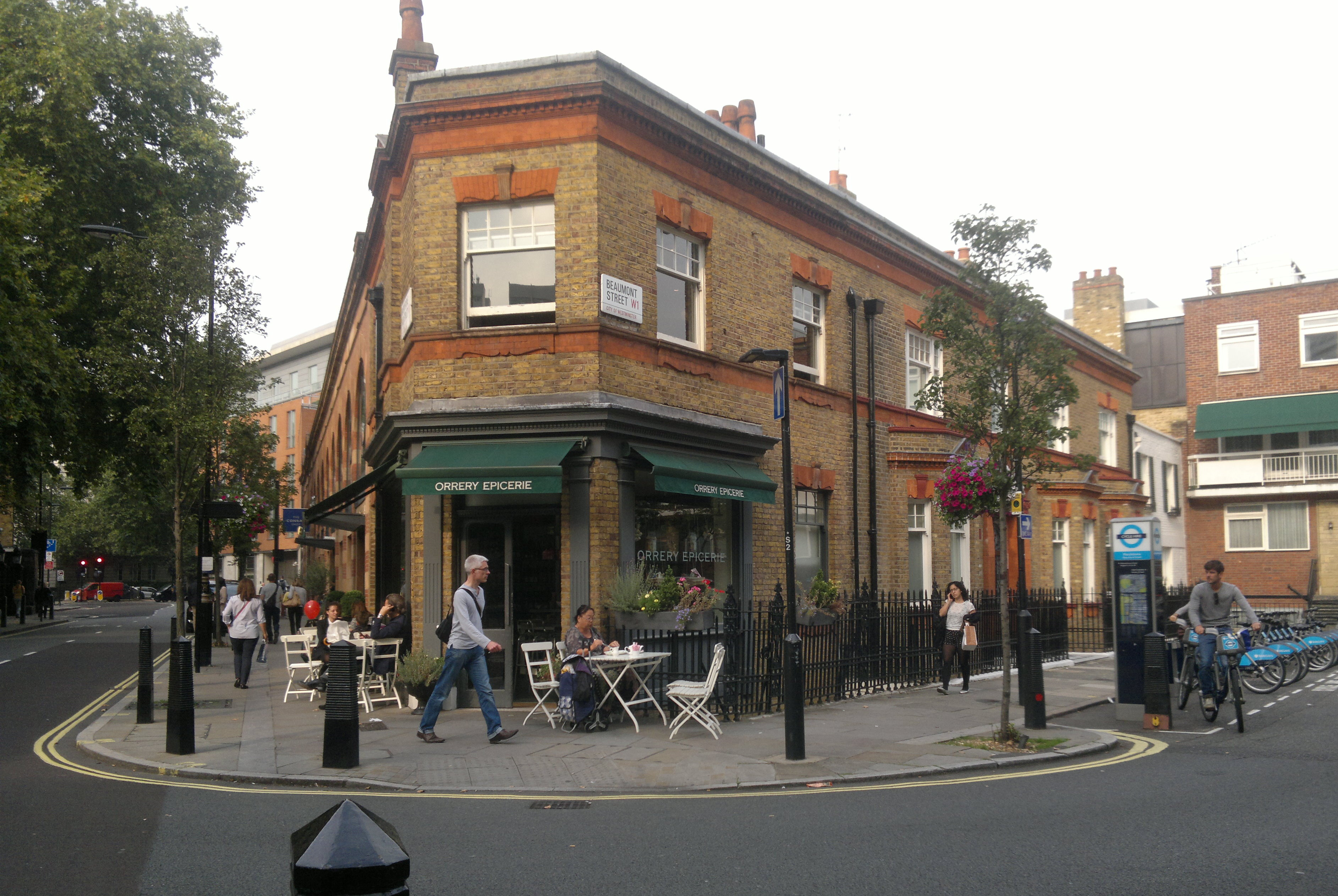
The Orrery Epicerie on the corner of Beaumont Street and Marylebone High Street in the north.

Beaumont Street is a street in the City of Westminster, London, that runs from Marylebone High Street in the north to the junction of Westmoreland Street and Weymouth Street in the south. The street is crossed midway by Devonshire Street and Clarkes Mews adjoins Beaumont Street on its eastern side at the southern end.

== Inhabitants ==
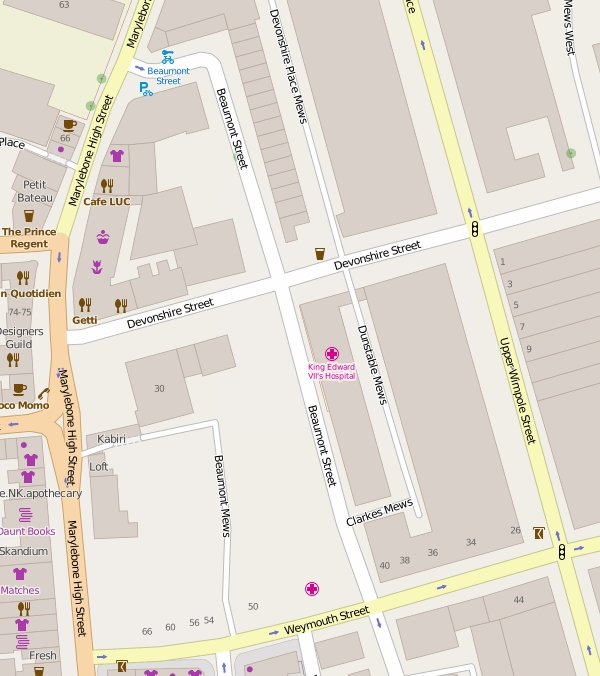
The immediate vicinity of Beaumont Street.

The historian John Richard Green lived at No. 4 The Macdonald sisters lived at No. 17 in the middle of the nineteenth century. Walter Savage Landor lived at No. 38 in 1794 after being expelled from Oxford University for firing a pistol at the window of a Tory at the university.

== Buildings ==
Beaumont Street is the home of the King Edward VII Hospital and for a time, the Marylebone Library.
