= Weymouth Street =

Street in the City of Westminster, London, England

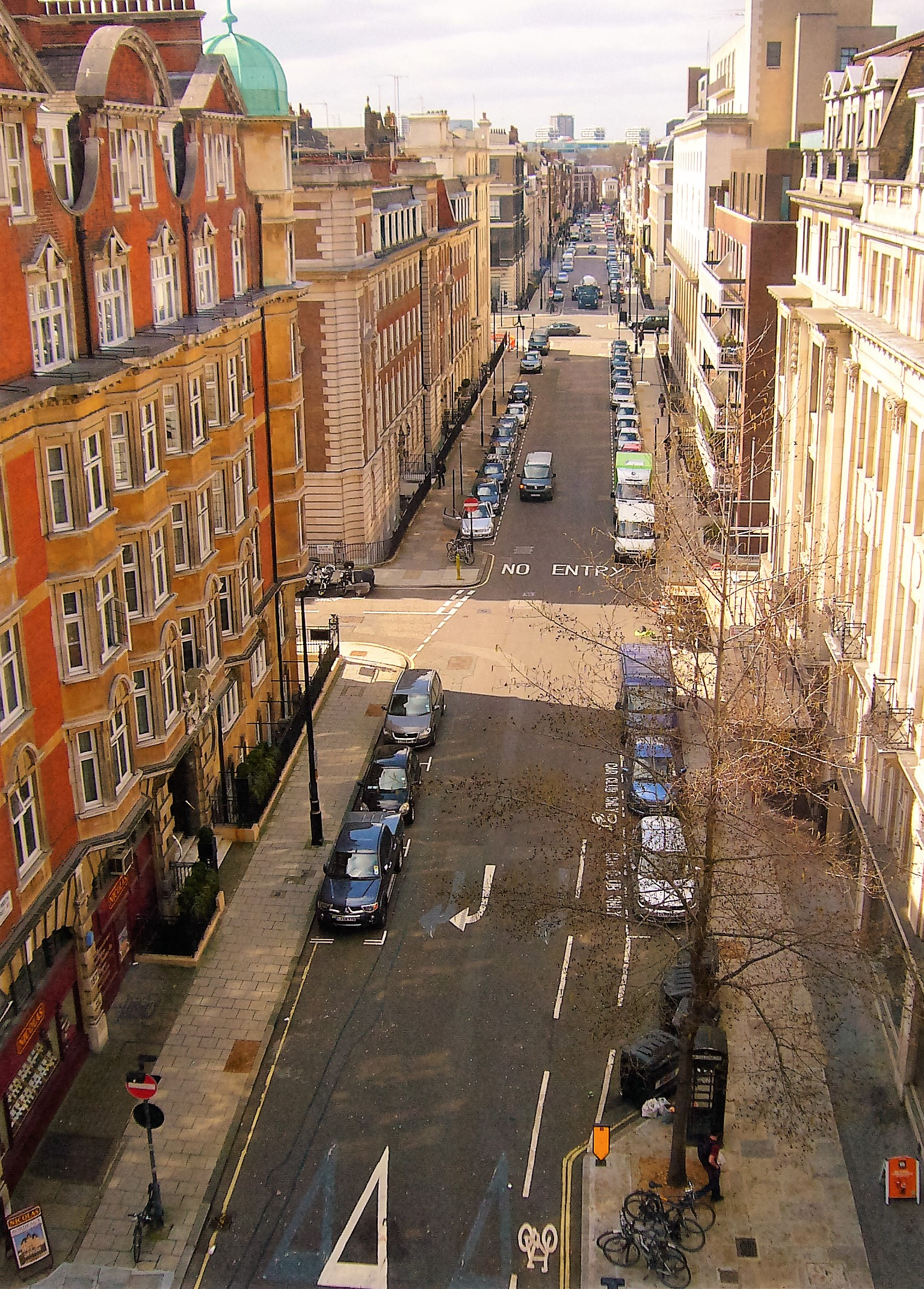
- Looking west down Weymouth Street in 2010
- Length: 601 m (1,972 ft)
- Location: Westminster, London
- Postal code: W1
- Nearest Tube station: Great Portland Street; Oxford Circus; Regent's Park; Bond Street
- Coordinates: 51°31′16.03″N 0°8′39.66″W
- East end: Great Portland Street
- West end: Marylebone High Street

Construction
- Completion: 1770

Weymouth Street lies in the Marylebone district of the City of Westminster and connects Marylebone High Street with Great Portland Street. The area was developed in the late 18th century by Henrietta Cavendish Holles and her husband Edward Harley, 2nd Earl of Oxford. This part of Marylebone was noted to part of Manor of Tyburn and dates back to the year 1086.

== History ==
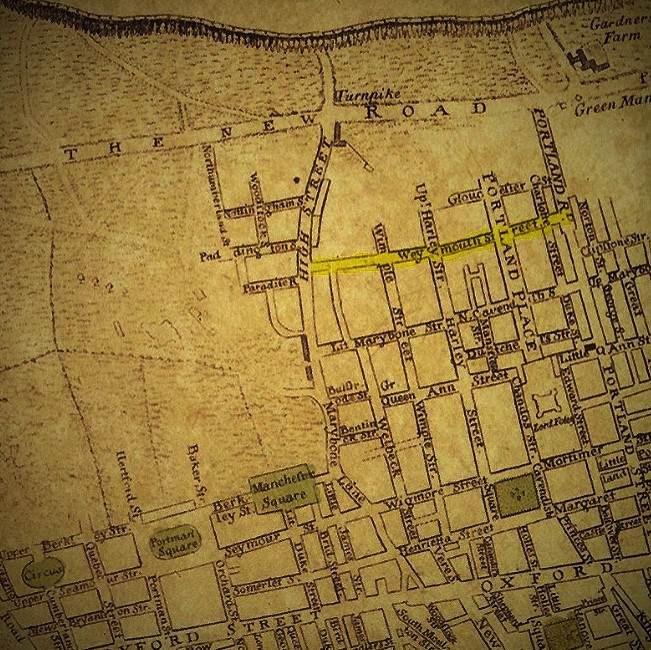
Map clipping of Marylebone from around 1770 with Weymouth Street outlined in yellow

The area of Marylebone in which Weymouth Street is located originally belonged to the Manor of Tyburn which existed at the time of the Domesday Book (1086). Weymouth Street was first laid out and built up in the late 1770s and early 1780s in line with the development of Harley Street, Portland Place and Great Portland Street. Approximately a century later, the street was partially rebuilt and modernised mainly with neoclassical architecture. At the beginning of the 1900s, following lease expiries, large mansion blocks were developed near the main intersections of the street. During the London Blitz of 1940–41, the street was struck twice by high explosive bombs. Some of the original 18th century buildings survive to this day, for example at 45-49 Weymouth Street.

== Location ==
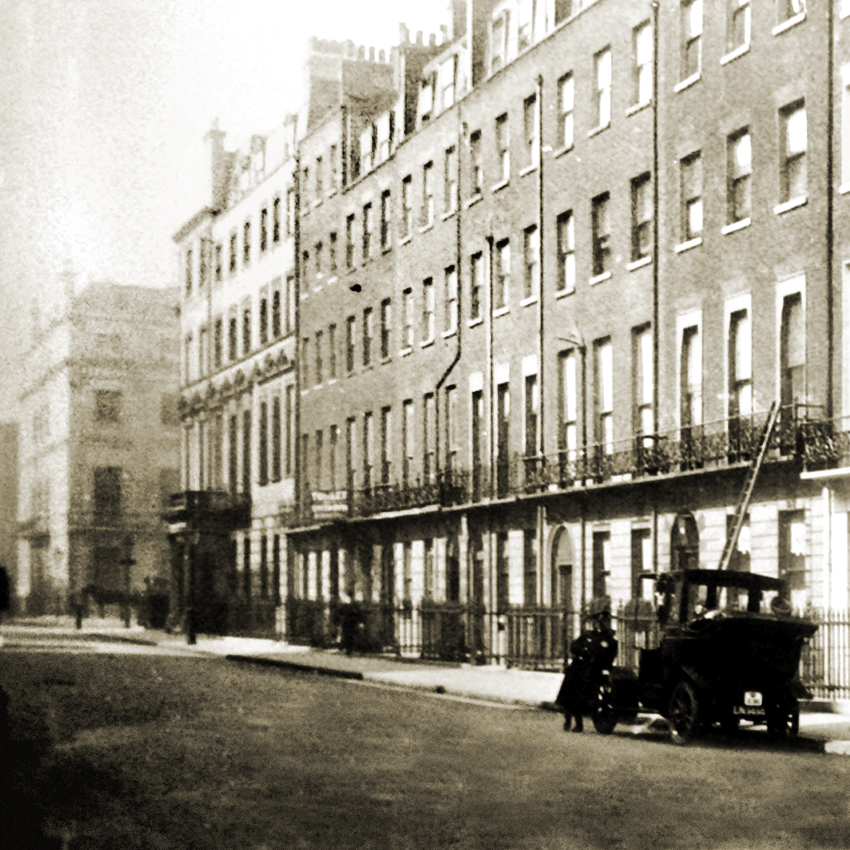
Weymouth Street looking west towards Portland Place around 1905.

Weymouth Street lies in the Parish of St. Marylebone. In administrative terms, the street lies within the City of Westminster's Marylebone High Street Ward as well as the Harley Street Conservation Area. It is one of the four principal streets that cross eastern Marylebone and its renowned medical district in and around Harley Street.

Weymouth Street is part of a rectilinear grid and is crossed by Harley Street, Portland Place, and Hallam Street. The streets that join Weymouth Street on its north side are (east to west) Beaumont Mews, Beaumont Street, Upper Wimpole Street, and Devonshire Mews South. On its south side it is joined by Marylebone Street, Wesley Street, Westmoreland Street, Wimpole Street, Wimpole Mews, and Weymouth Mews.

== Land ownership ==
Almost all of Weymouth Street is now part of the Howard de Walden Estate. Its eastern edge by Great Portland Street is controlled by the Langham Estate (on land once also part of the Howard de Walden Estate).

== Character ==
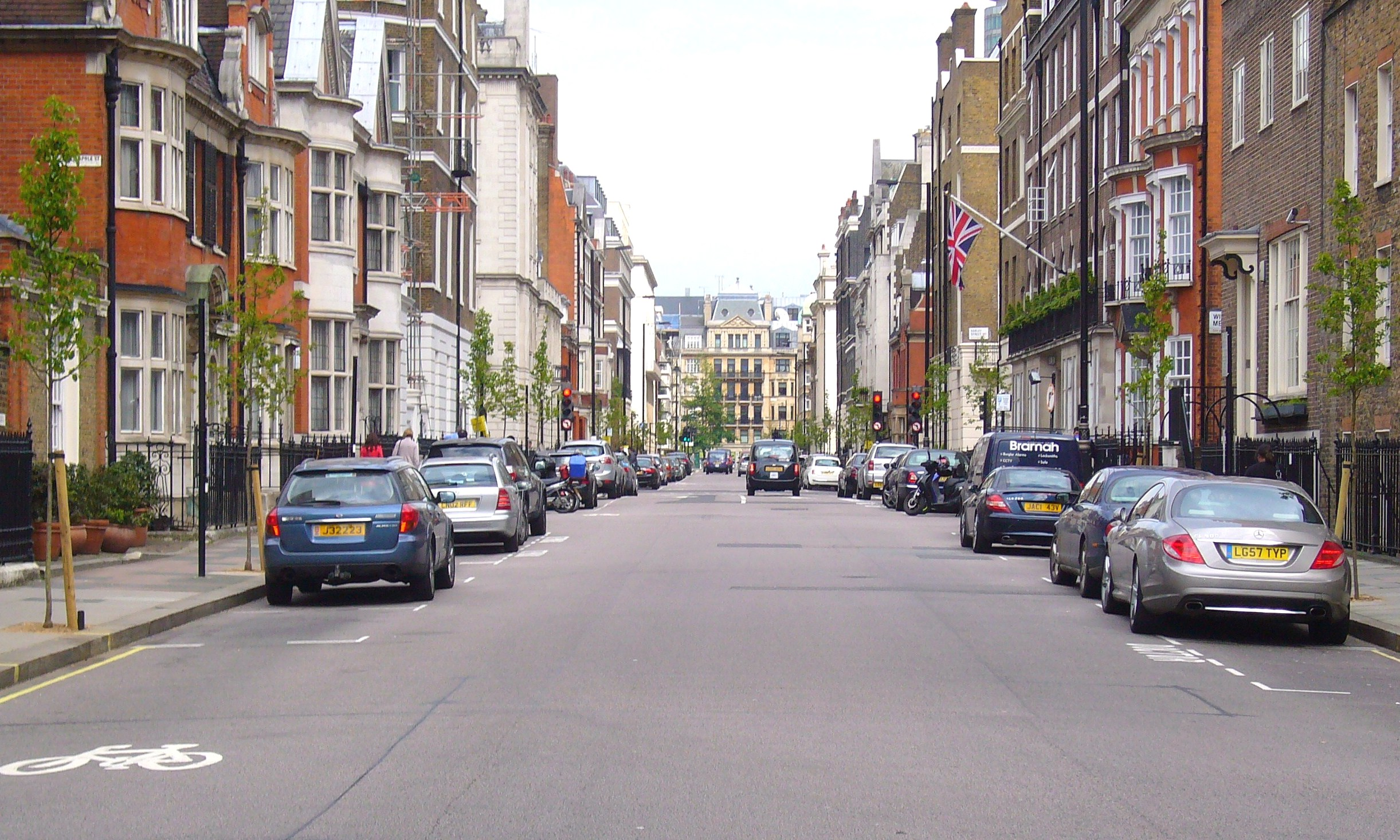
View east down Weymouth Street in 2010

The street is known for its medical establishments, most notably The Harley Street Clinic built in 1935. Over time, larger institutional and residential buildings replaced earlier Georgian terraces at its intersections with Marylebone High Street, Portland Place and Great Portland Street. In contrast, central sections of the street still "retain much of their former domestic scale and character." The street was lined with trees in 2010 as part of a neighbourhood community and stakeholder-based greening initiative.

== Notable residents ==
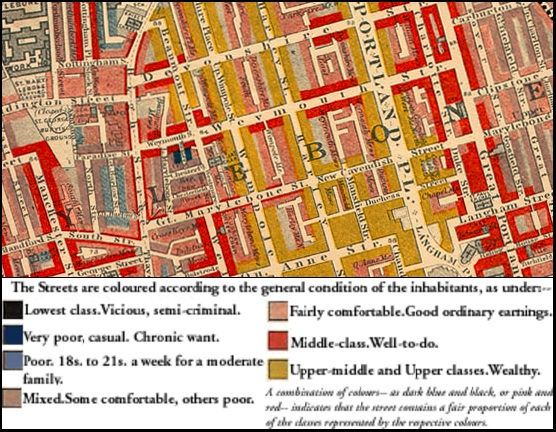
Marylebone extract from Charles Booth's 1889 London survey of the lives and occupations of area residents.

Notable residents who have lived on Weymouth Street include Edward Foley (1747–1803), MP, the second son of Lord Foley, of Foley House Ernest Vaughan, 4th Earl of Lisburne (no 40), James Butler, 1st Marquess of Ormonde (no 14), the portraitist Mary Grace, the actress Mary Wells (actress) (no 12), Michael Faraday (no 18), the writer Jane Marcet (no 49), Queen Marie-Louise Coidavid of the Kingdom of Haiti - the first Black monarchy established in the Western world - (also no 49) and psychoanalyst Dr Estelle Maud Cole, journalist and broadcaster Gilbert Harding, the entertainer Hughie Green and the pathologist Professor Keith Simpson (the latter four all lived at 1 Weymouth Street).

== Listed buildings ==
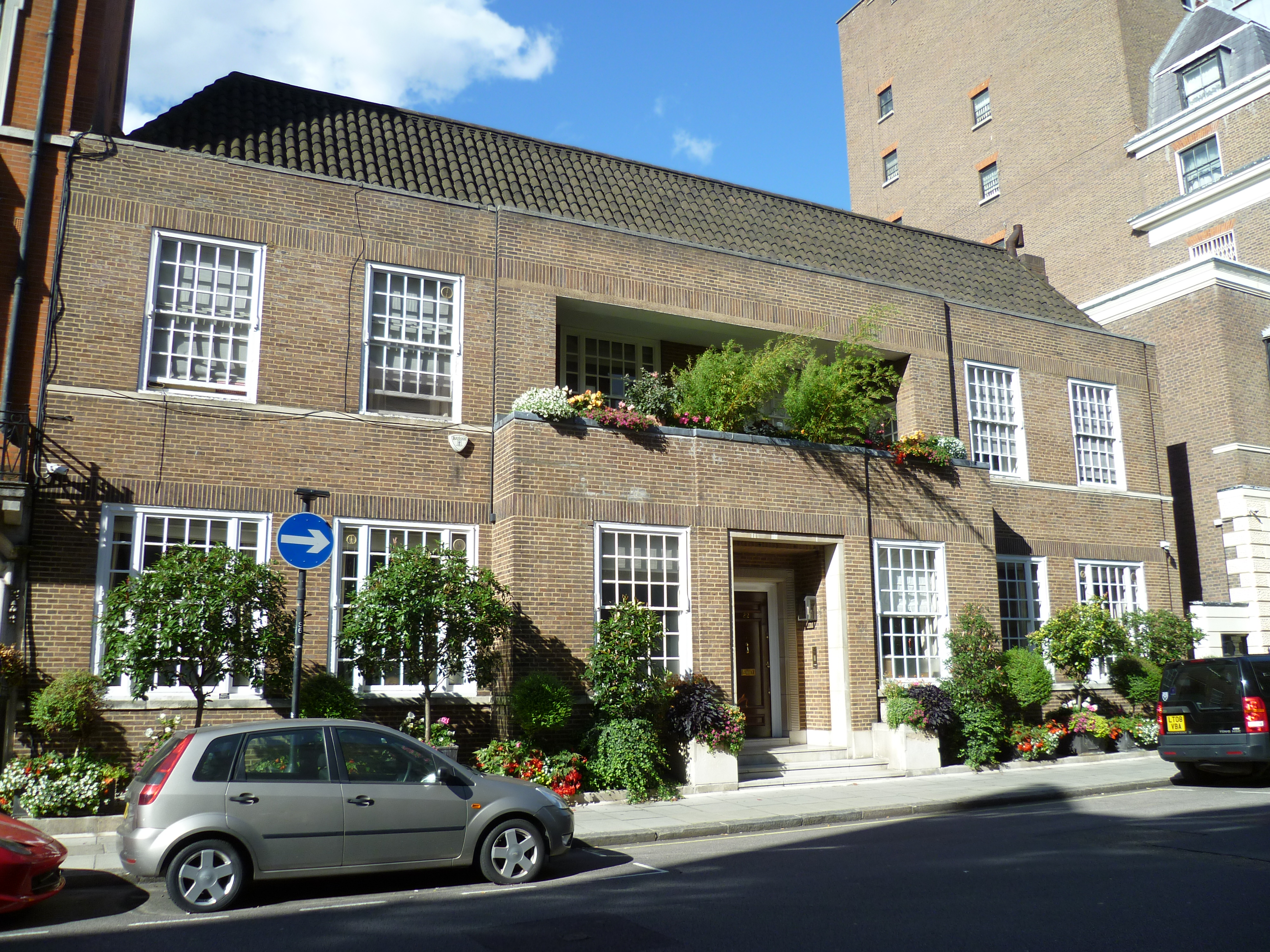
22 Weymouth Street is Grade II listed

There are a large number of listed buildings in Weymouth Street, all of which are Grade II. 69 Portland Place and 115 Harley Street, both of which are on the corner with Weymouth Street, are both Grade II*. 22 Weymouth Street (1934) is notable for its combination of traditional and modernist architectural elements. All of Weymouth Street lies within the Harley Street Conservation Area.

== Gallery ==
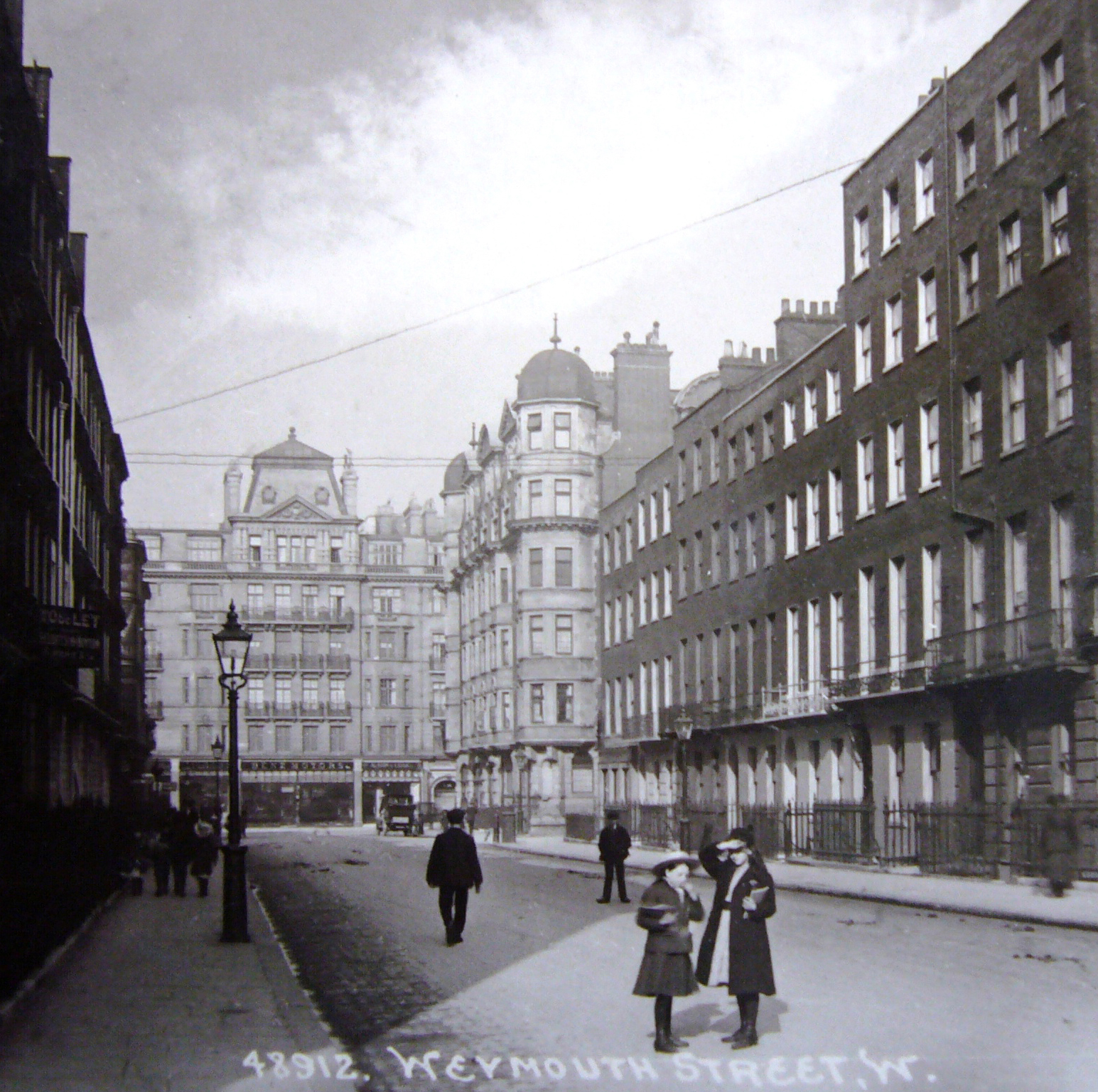
Weymouth Street in 1905 looking east towards Great Portland Street.

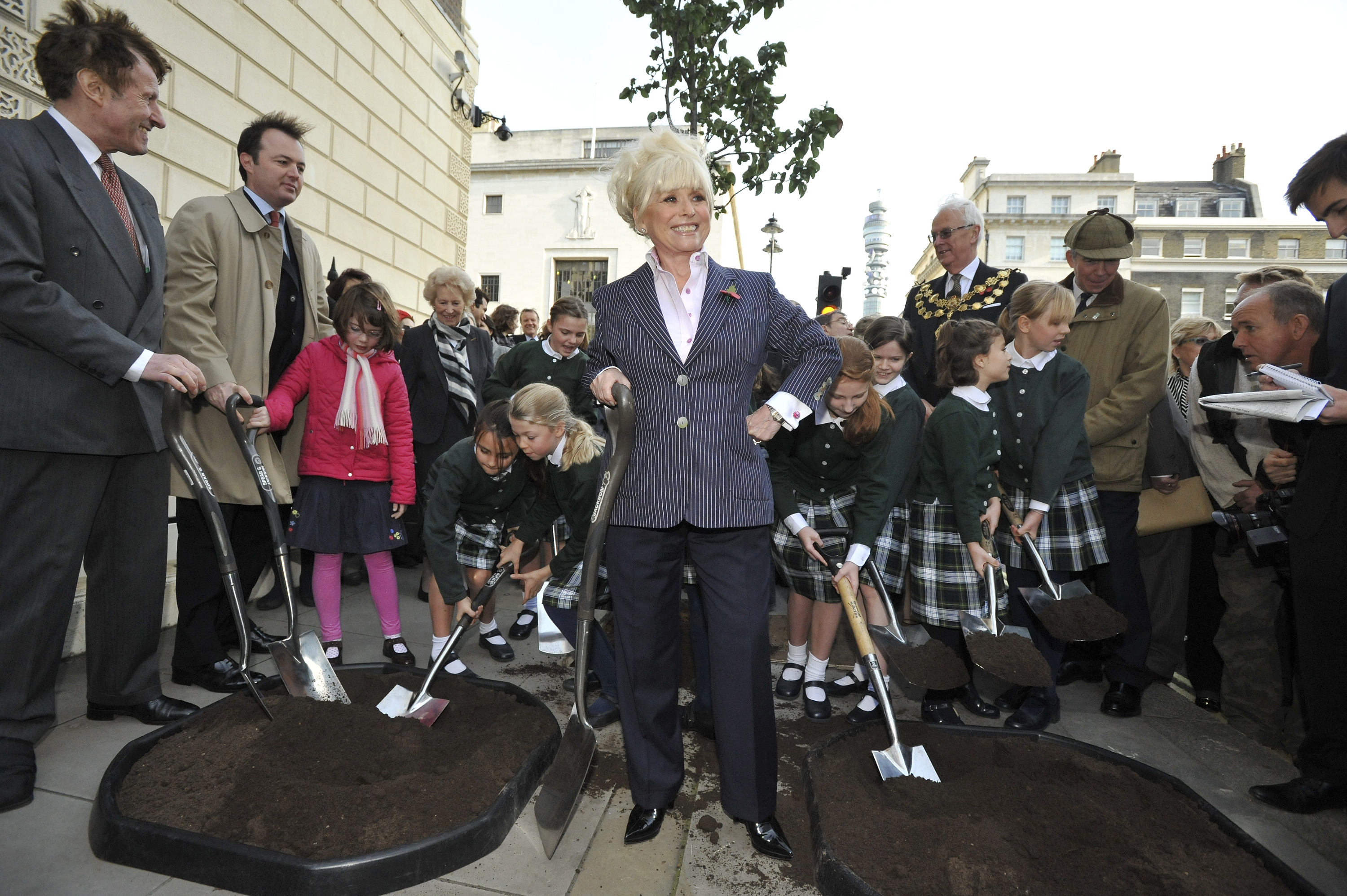
Barbara Windsor, actress, with local residents plants the last of 53 trees to be added to Weymouth Street in 2010.

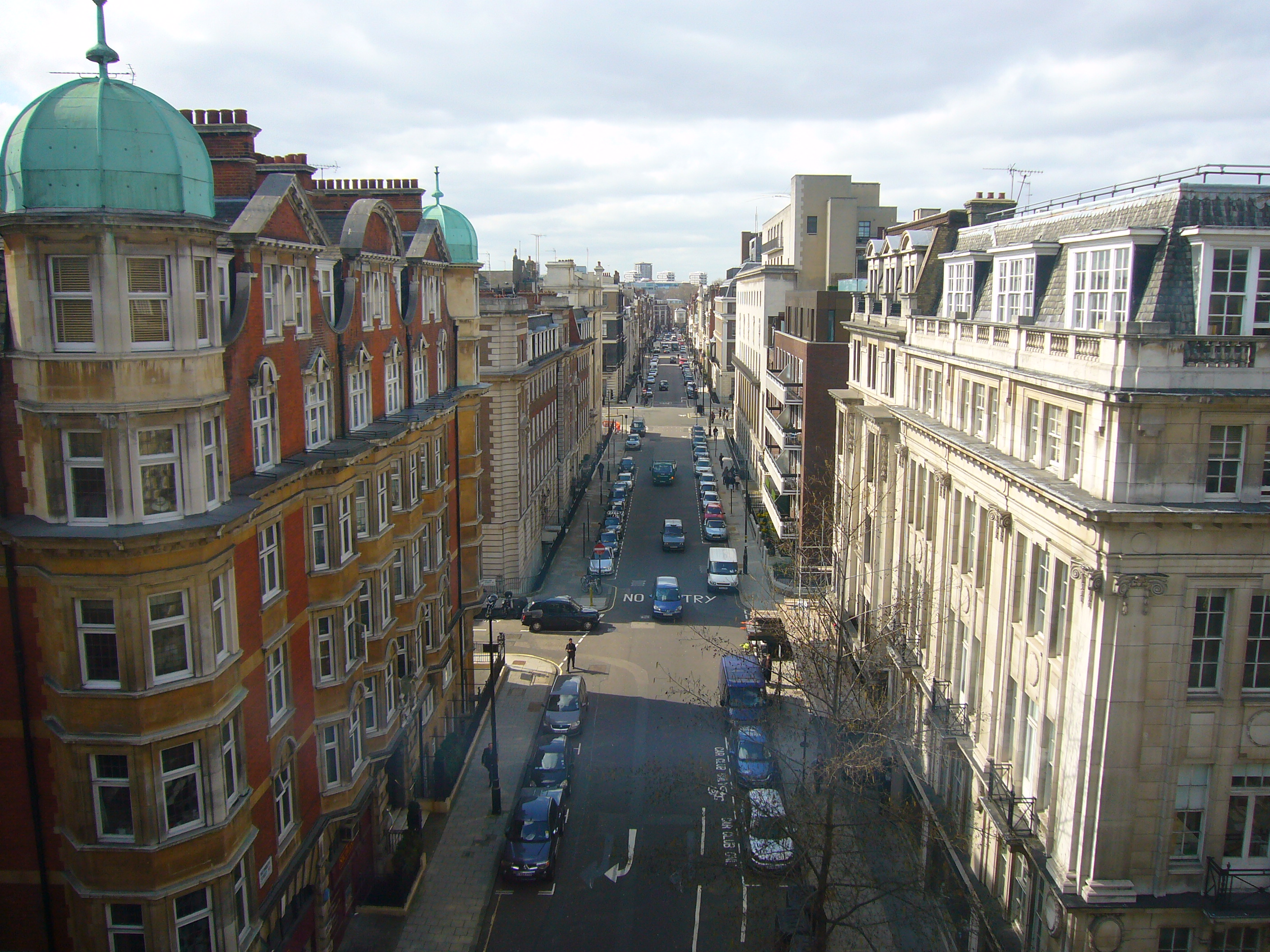
Photograph looking west down Weymouth Street in 2010.

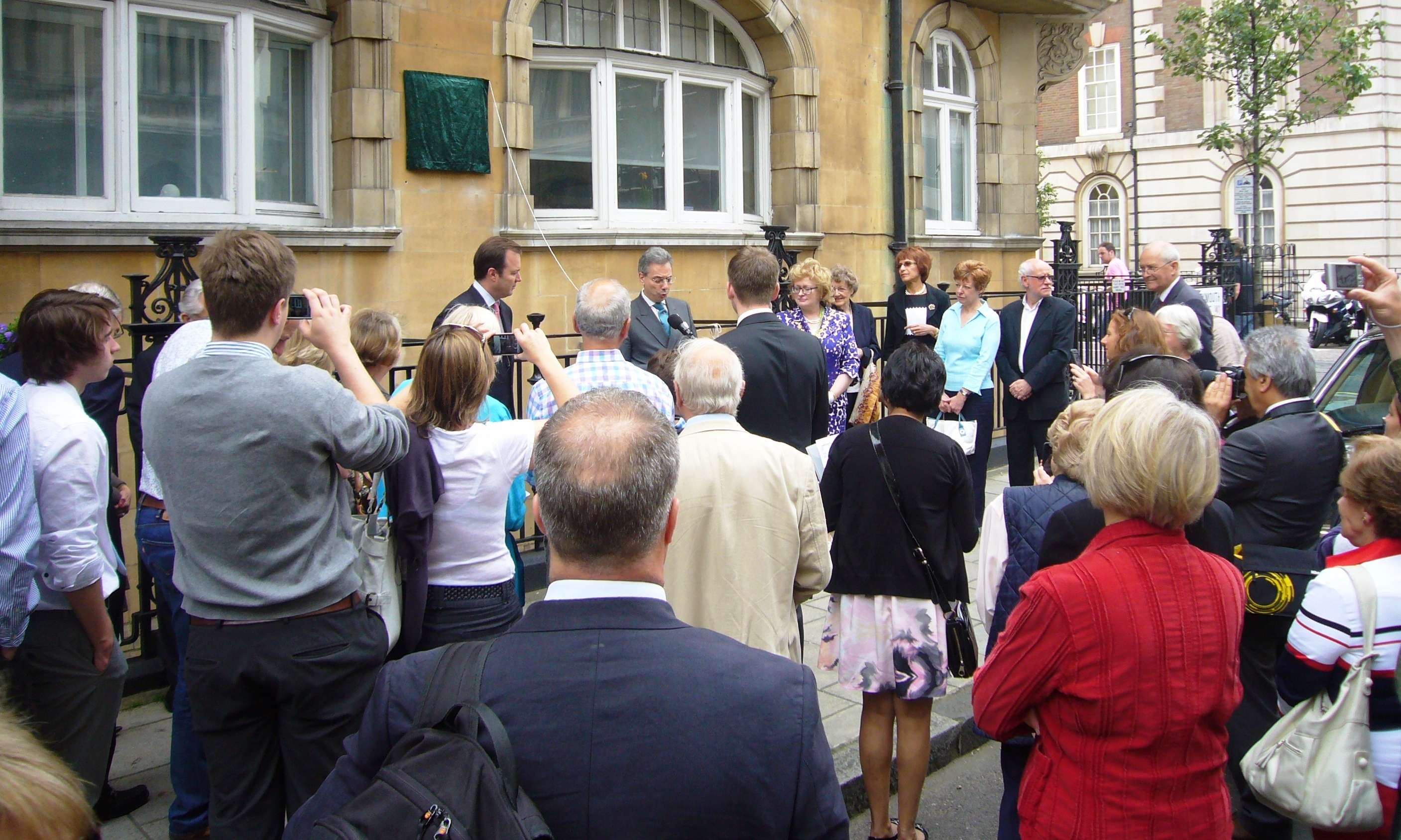
WCC Green Plaque unveiling for Professor Keith Simpson at 1 Weymouth Street in 2012

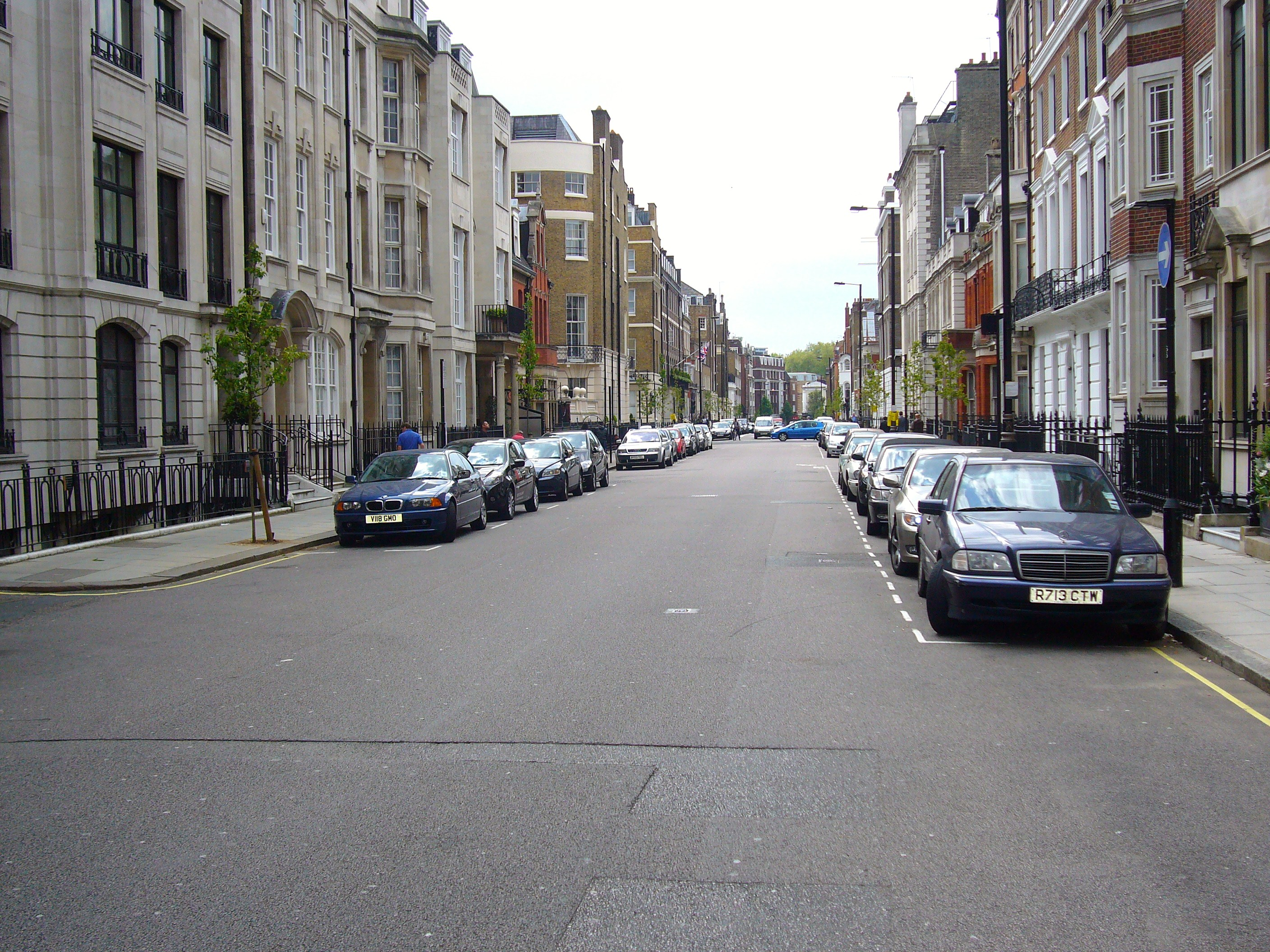
Weymouth Street views towards Marylebone High Street in 2009

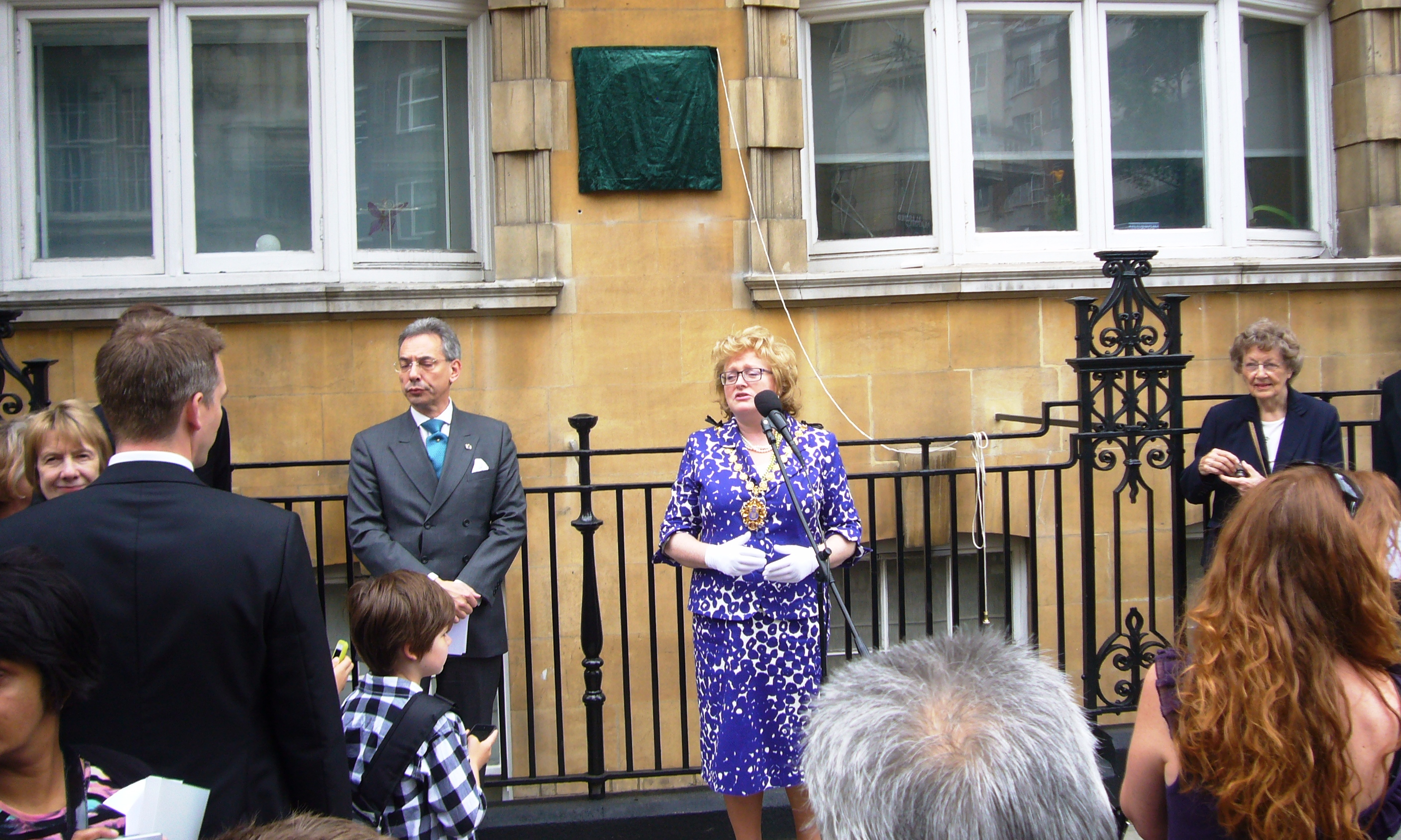
Lord Mayor of Westminster speeches at 1 Weymouth Street in summer 2012
