= 22 Weymouth Street =

London house

Coordinates: 51.520896°N 0.146308°W

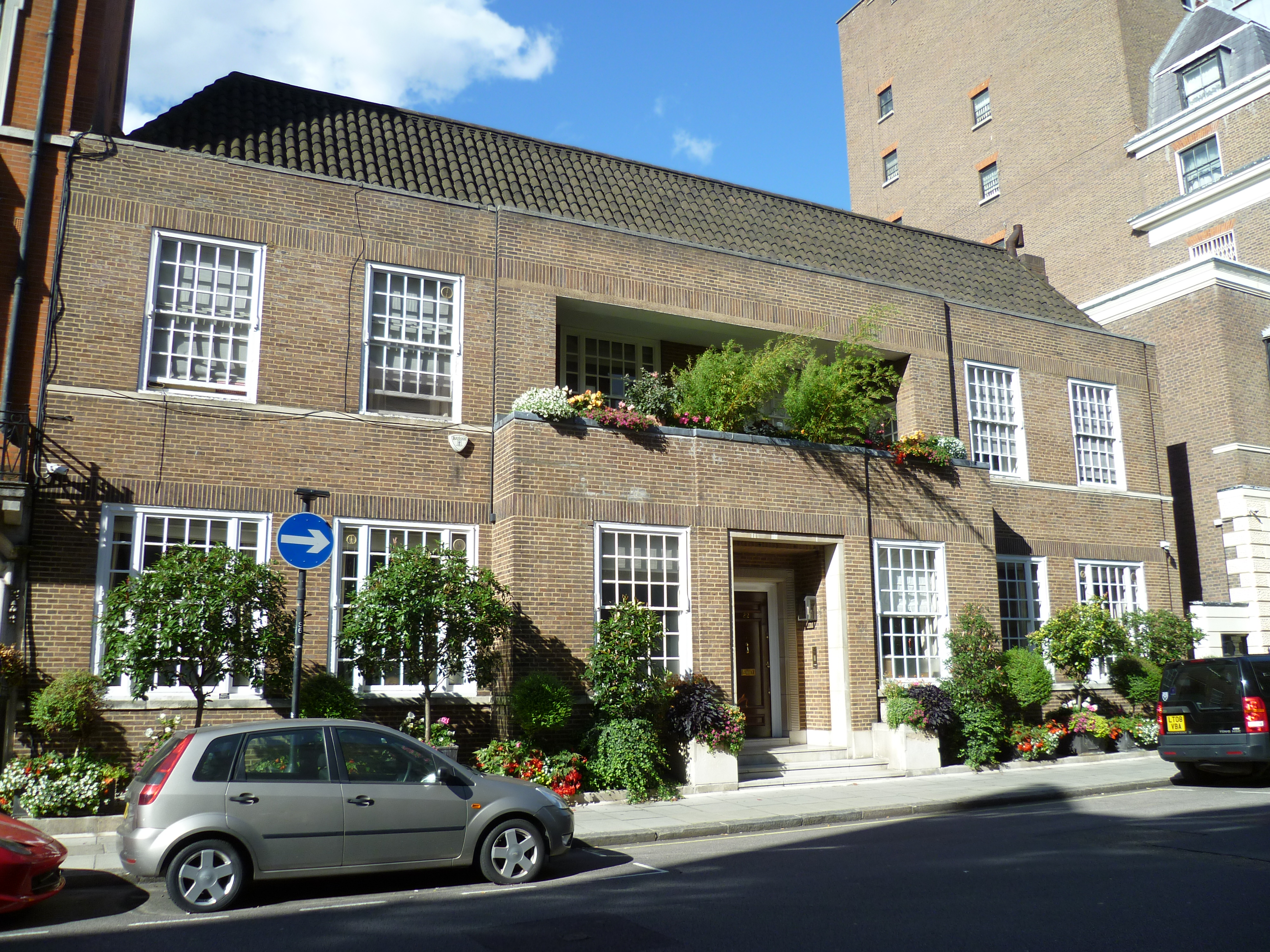
22 Weymouth Street

22 Weymouth Street is a grade II listed building in Weymouth Street, in the City of Westminster. The house was built in 1934 by Bovis Ltd to a design by Giles Gilbert Scott and his brother Adrian Gilbert Scott. It is notable for the combination of traditional and modernist architectural elements.
