= Benjamin Bennet (minister) =

English Presbyterian minister

Benjamin Bennet (ca. 1674 – 1 September 1726) was an English Presbyterian minister.

== Life ==
Bennet was born in Wellsborough, in Sibson, Leicestershire. He received his elementary education in his parish school. He went next to Sheriff Hales in Shropshire, under John Woodhouse who ran a dissenting academy.

Bennet began his public ministry as a preacher-evangelist at Temple Hall, a village near his native place. He immediately succeeded John Sheffield on his move to Southwark in 1697. He was not formally ordained until 30 May 1699. This was done in Oldbury chapel in Shropshire by some of the surviving ejected ministers, along with three others, one of whom was John Reynolds of Shrewsbury. He became noted for his eloquence in the pulpit.

In 1703 he accepted an invitation to go to Newcastle-on-Tyne as colleague to Richard Gilpin. The congregation had been weakened by a temporary secession under one of Gilpin's assistants, Thomas Bradbury. Ben Bennet used to spend sixty hours a week in his study, and days were consecrated to intercessory prayer and fasting.

Never robust, Bennet had, for twelve years before his death, an assistant, Samuel Lawrence. It was during their joint ministry that the congregation erected their second church in Hanover Square, Westgate Street. Bennet did not live to see it opened; he died of a fever in his fifty-second year, on 1 September 1726. Bennet baptised the poet Mark Akenside in 1721.

== Works ==
Besides hymns, Bennet wrote religious and historical works. His Irenicum, or a Review of some late controversies about the Trinity, Private Judgment ... and the Rights of Conscience from the Misrepresentations of the Dean of Winchester [Francis Hare] in his "Scripture vindicated from the Misrepresentations of the Lord Bishop of Bangor" (1722), is measured in its tone; but it was attacked by John Atkinson of Stainton, an ultra-orthodox nonconformist. In 1714, on the death of Queen Anne and the accession of King George I, Bennet published some sermons under the title Several Discourses Against Popery, in view of the dangers of a restoration of the Catholic House of Stuart. His Christian's Oratory, or the Devotion of the Closet, went through many editions (a sixth edition was published in 1760, and a seventh in 1776). Bennet's manuscripts yielded a number of posthumous publications, among them: a second part of his Christian's Oratory (1728); Truth, Importance, and Usefulness of Scripture (1730); View of the whole System of Popery (1781).

In 1717 Bennet published A Memorial of the Reformation, growing out of a sermon preached on George I's coronation; it was a Protestant view of the Reformation. It preserved anecdotes from original sources not to be found elsewhere, as, for instance, of Judge Jeffreys's visit to Newcastle in 1683. A second, updated edition (dedicated to Lord Barrington) appeared in 1721 covering further episodes in English history such as the Civil War. This work led to a disagreement with Zachary Grey, with Bennet defending himself in his Defence of the 'Memorial of the Reformation' (1723).

== Notes ==
Attribution

This article incorporates text from a publication now in the public domain: "Bennet, Benjamin". Dictionary of National Biography. London: Smith, Elder & Co. 1885–1900.
