= Westmoreland Street, London =

Street in Marylebone, London

Westmoreland Street
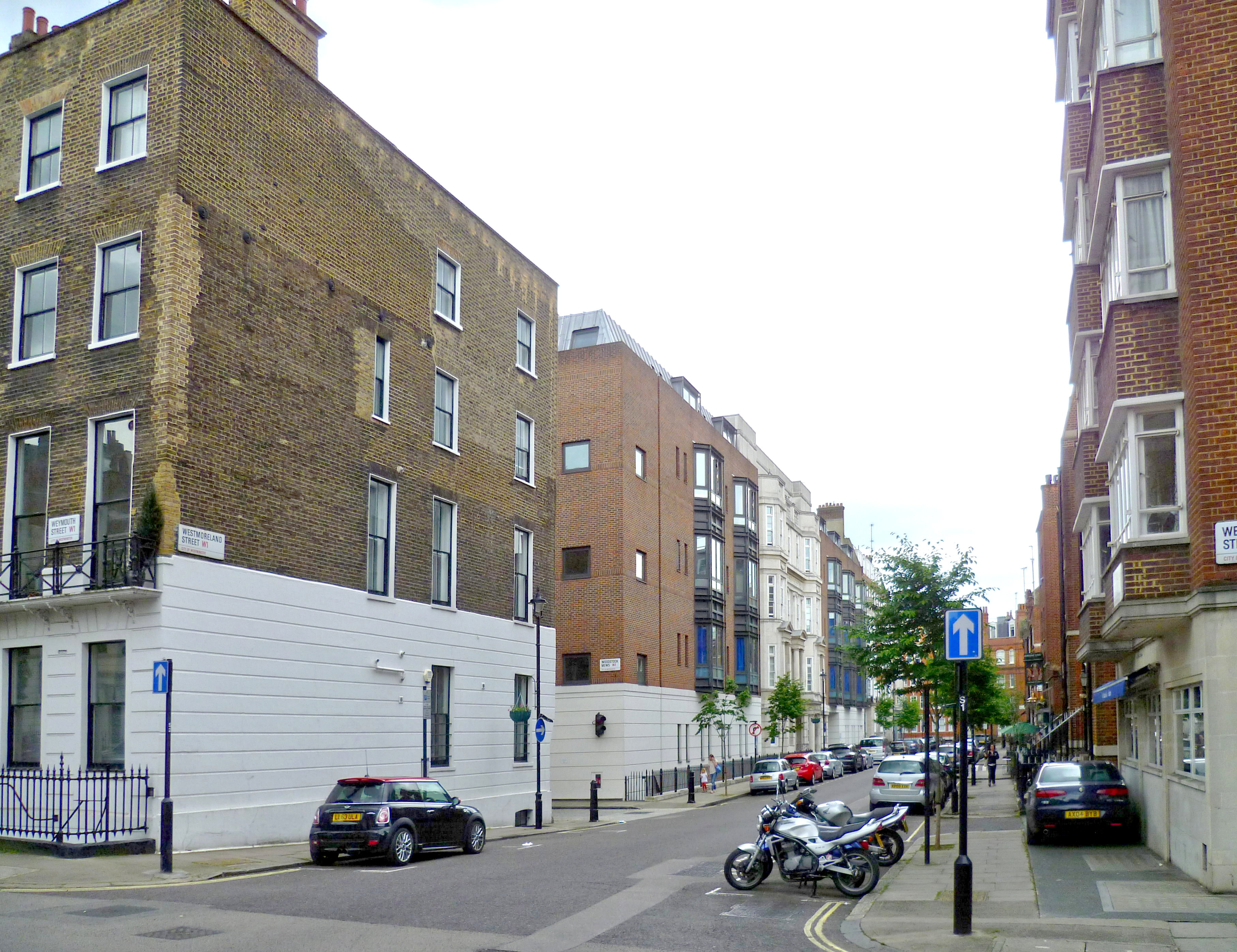
- Westmoreland Street looking south
- Interactive map of Westmoreland Street
- Former name: Woodstock Street (north part)
- Area: Marylebone
- Location: City of Westminster
- Postal code: W1G
- Coordinates: 51°31′11″N 00°09′00″W

Other
- Known for: Welbeck Chapel (St James's Church); National Heart Hospital

Westmoreland Street is in the Marylebone district of the City of Westminster in London, England. The street was built from the 1760s by William Franks and runs from Beaumont Street and Weymouth Street in the north to New Cavendish Street in the south. It was formerly the location of the Welbeck Chapel, which became St James's Church. In 1968, it was the site of Britain's first heart transplant when the National Heart Hospital was located there. The hospital is now known as University College Hospital at Westmoreland Street.

== Origins and location ==
Westmoreland Street is located in the Marylebone district of the City of Westminster, London, and runs from Beaumont Street and Weymouth Street in the north to New Cavendish Street in the south. Woodstock Mews is accessed from its eastern side, and Wheatley Street and De Walden Street join it on its western side. It was built from the 1760s by the local builder William Franks. The origin of its name is unknown.

The northern section above Wheatley Street was originally named Woodstock Street, which is still the name of the adjoining mews, and was a separate and narrower street. It was widened in 1862 and 1874 until the two streets became one.

Another location with the same name, Westmoreland Street, SW1, was renamed to Westmoreland Terrace in the 1930s.

== Buildings ==
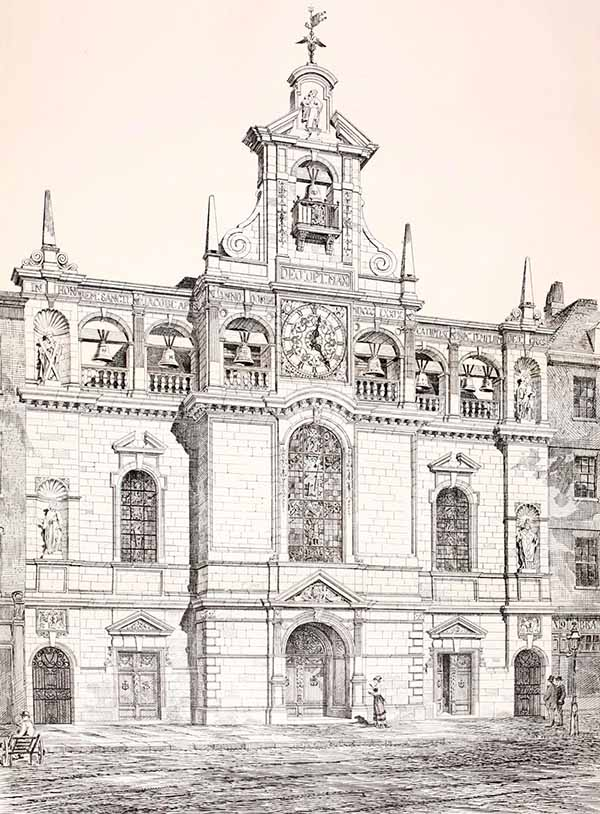
Design for St James's Church by George Gilbert Scott Jr., published in The Building News, 1879.

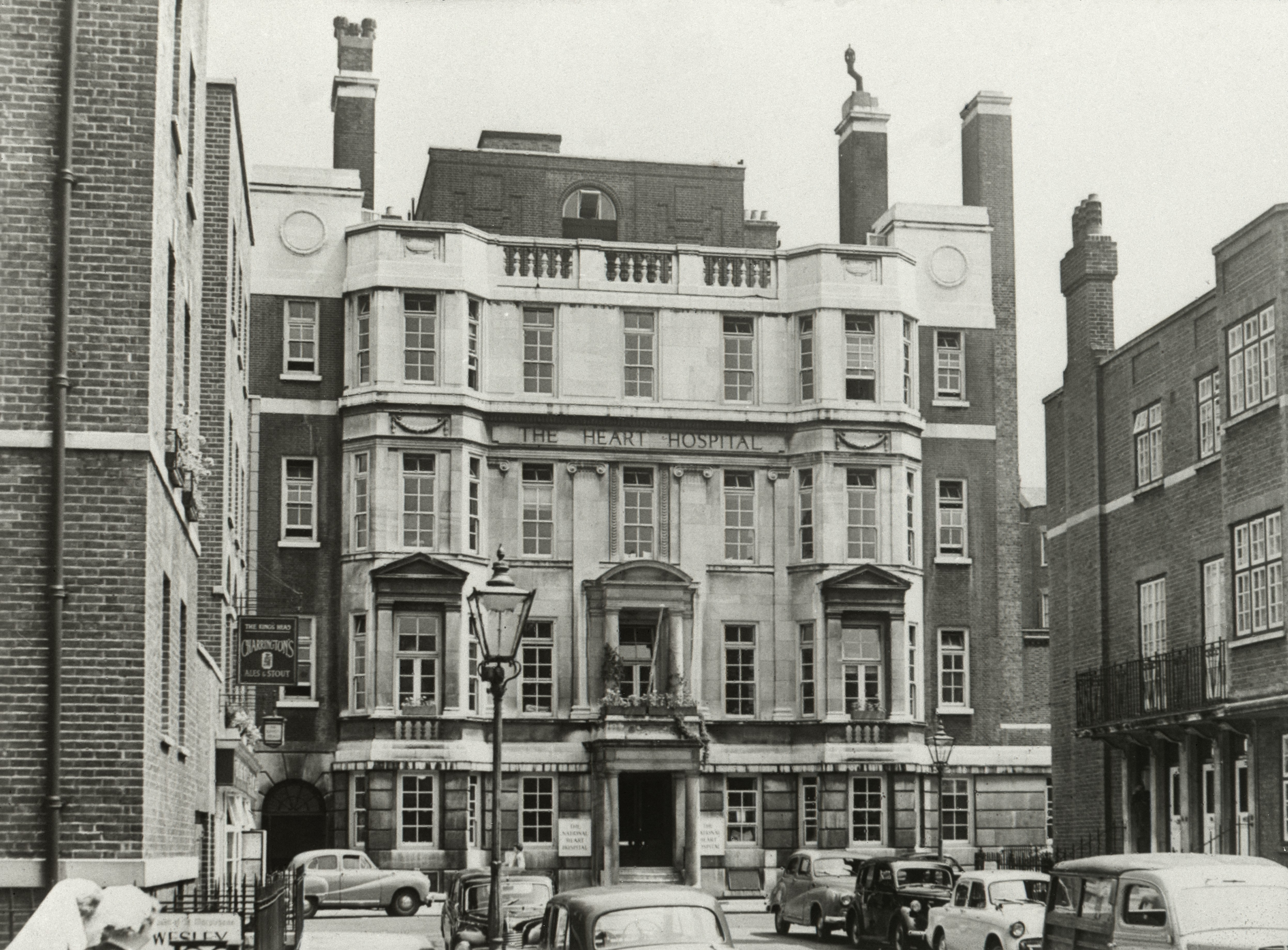
Historic image of The National Heart Hospital, Westmoreland Street, now University College Hospital.

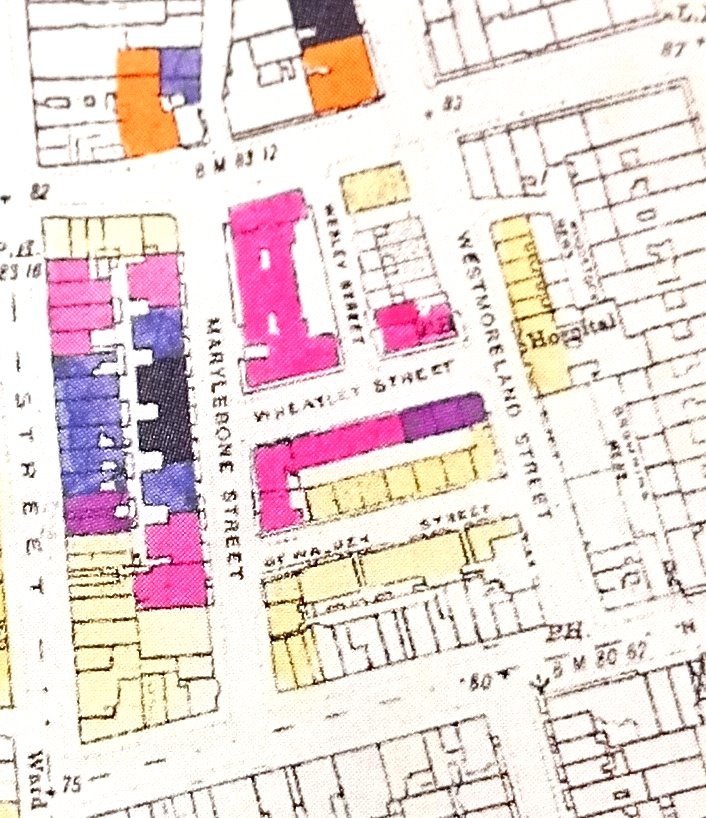
Bomb damage map for the Marylebone Street, Wheatley Street, and Westmoreland Street vicinity

The street was formerly the location of the Tichfield Chapel, which was built by William Franks facing Wheatley Street. In 1773, he sold it to John Sarson who owned the stable-yard in Little Marylebone Street. It became the Welbeck Chapel around 1800 and in 1817 was transferred to the Crown. It was renovated and in 1831 was renamed St James's Church. Thomas Hartwell Horne spent part of his early clerical career there and Hugh Reginald Haweis officiated from 1866, who has been described as the "most prominent exponent of spiritualism among London clergy". The church was highly successful under Haweis and was renovated again in 1870–71 with the installation of new stained-glass windows and later in the decade George Gilbert Scott Jr. drew-up designs for a new exterior. The church stagnated under the later years of Haweis's tenure after he was affected by scandal, and it closed two years after his death in 1901. It was demolished around 1907. Records relating to the church are held by the British National Archives.

It is the former home of the National Heart Hospital, which moved there from Soho Square in 1914, and occupies the site left vacant by the demolition of St James's Church. During the First World War it became a centre for the treatment of military recruits with heart problems. In 1968, Donald Ross and his team carried out Britain's first heart transplant there. That day, on 3 May 1968, traffic stood still while the ambulance arrived with the donor heart, and photographs of the street appeared in the Sun, Daily Mail and Daily Express. The hospital moved to the Fulham Road, London, in 1991 and after a period of private ownership the hospital in 2001 re-entered the National Health Service, where it is known as University College Hospital at Westmoreland Street.

Westmoreland Street and Wheatley Street were seriously damaged by German bombing during the Second World War with the whole of Wheatley Street marked as damaged to some degree. Numbers 18 to 28 on the south side of Wheatley at the Westmoreland end were hit in September 1940 during the Blitz and marked as "damaged beyond repair" on the London County Council's bomb damage maps but were rebuilt in duplicate in 1948. The maps also show blast damage to other buildings on the west side of Westmoreland Street and to a row of six buildings on the east side of the street opposite the entrance to Wheatley Street, including the hospital. The King's Head public house at 13 Westmoreland Street, on the corner with Wheatley Street, was badly damaged and required partial rebuilding.
