= Shenstone =

Shenstone may refer to:

== Places in England ==
- Shenstone, Staffordshire, a village
- Shenstone, Worcestershire, a village

== People with the surname ==
- Allen Shenstone (1893–1980), Canadian physicist
- Beverley Shenstone (1906-1979), Canadian aerodynamicist
- Clare Shenstone, English artist
- Michael Shenstone (1928-2019), Canadian diplomat
- William Shenstone (1714–1763), English poet and landscape gardener

== See also ==
- Shenston, Ontario, Canada
