= Benjamin Robinson (minister) =

British clergyman (1666–1724)

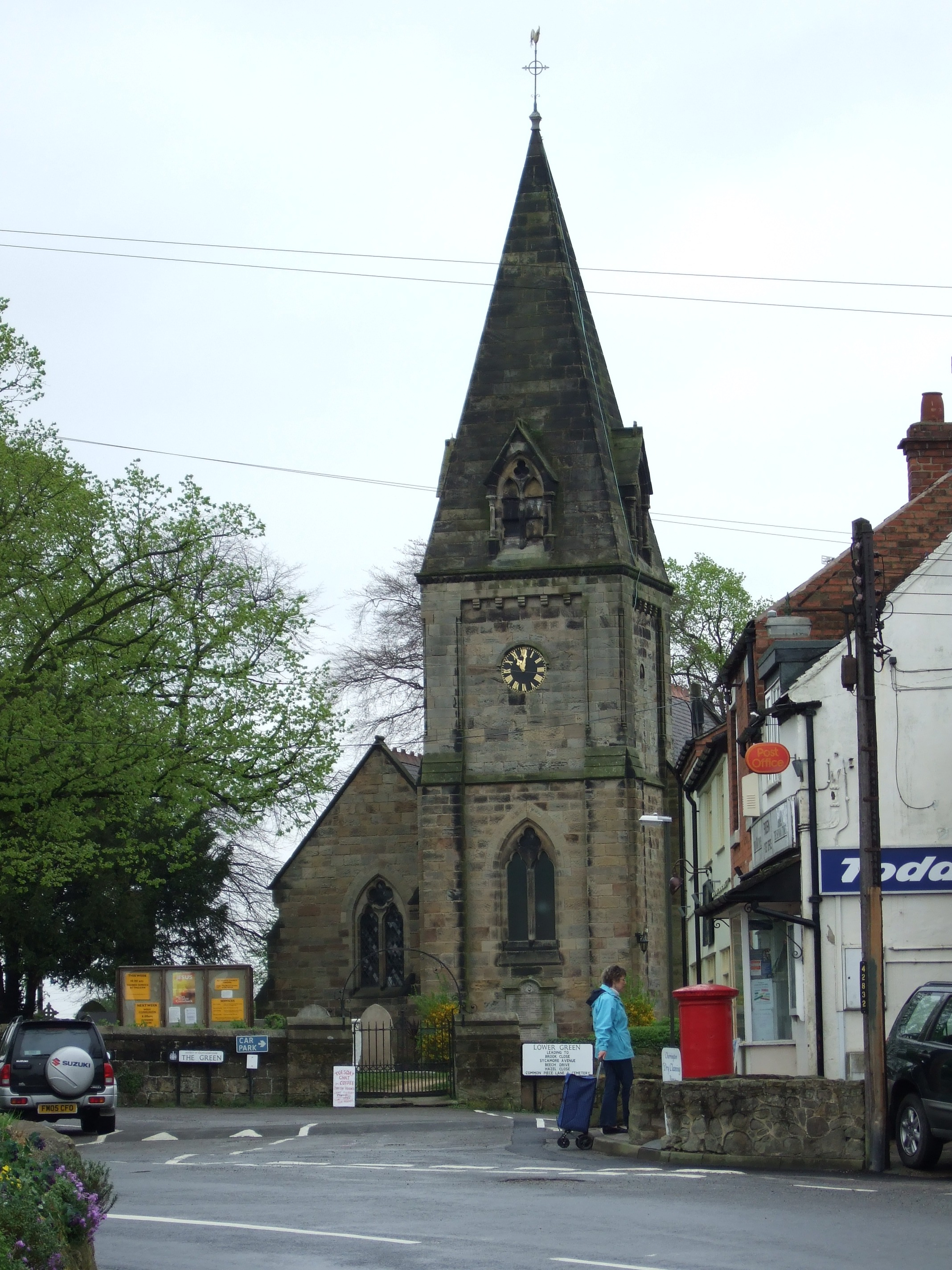
- His first church in Findern (today)
- Born: 1666; Derby, Derbyshire
- Died: 1724
- Education: Sheriff Hales, Shropshire
- Occupation: Presbyterian minister
- Spouse: Anne
- Children: several

Benjamin Robinson (1666–1724) was an English Presbyterian church minister who was a pupil of Samuel Ogden (1626–1697). He came to be a respected theologian and had his views published. He started a school in Findern in south Derbyshire.

== Life ==
Benjamin Robinson was born at Derby in 1666 and educated for the ministry by John Woodhouse at the dissenting academy in Sheriffhales, then in Staffordshire. He began life as chaplain and tutor in the family of Sir John Gell at Hopton, Derbyshire. He was subsequently chaplain at Normanton to Samuel Saunders, upon whose death he married and settled as Presbyterian minister of Findern, Derbyshire, being ordained on 10 October 1688.

In 1693 he opened a school at Findern, and for so doing was cited into the bishop's court. Knowing William Lloyd, then bishop of Coventry and Lichfield, he went to remonstrate with him. Lloyd stayed the prosecution, and discussed nonconformity with Robinson till two o'clock in the morning; they afterwards corresponded. John Howe recommended him to a congregation at Hungerford, Berkshire, to which he removed from Findern in 1693. Here also, in 1696, he set up a school which developed into an academy for training ministers; students were sent to him by the Presbyterian fund. It was his aim to inspire them with proper sentiments and dispositions to allure them to habits of study.

Gilbert Burnet, Bishop of Salisbury, being at Hungerford on a visitation, sent for Robinson, who defended his course and gained Burnet's friendship. Subsequently he and Edmund Calamy had several interviews with Burnet in 1702, when nonconformist matters were before parliament. It was said "he could do as much in an hour as another man could in a day".

In 1700 he succeeded Woodhouse, his former tutor, as Presbyterian minister at Little St. Helen's, Bishopsgate Street in the City of London. Here he enjoyed great popularity as a preacher, having much natural eloquence, and a gift of rapid composition with a strong pen. In 1705 he succeeded George Hamond as one of the Salters' Hall lecturers, and made this his first business when declining health compelled him to limit his work.

He died on 30 April 1724, and was buried in Bunhill Fields. He left a widow, Anne, and several children.

== Major works ==
1. A Plea for ... Mr. Baxter in answer to Mr. Lobb, &c., 1697, 8vo defends Baxter's view of the Atonement).
2. A Review of the Case of Liturgies, &c., 1710, 8vo.
3. A Letter ... in defence of the Review, &c., 1710, 8vo (both in reply to Thomas Bennet, D.D.
4. ' The Question stated, and the Scripture Evidence of the Trinity proposed,' 1719, 4to, being the second part of ' The Doctrine of the Ever Blessed Trinity stated and defended ... by four subscribing ministers.'
