= Samuel Wright (nonconformist) =

English dissenting minister

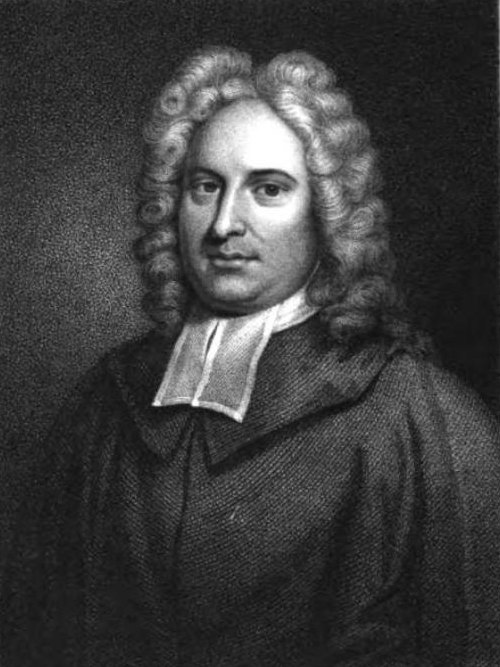
- Born: 30 January 1683; Retford, Nottinghamshire
- Died: April 1746

Samuel Wright (1683–1746) was an English dissenting minister.

== Life ==
Left early an orphan, Wright was brought up in his mother's family, who sent him to boarding schools at Attercliffe, near Sheffield, and Darton, near Wakefield. In 1699 he entered the Attercliffe academy of Timothy Jollie. Leaving in 1704, he became chaplain at Haigh, Lancashire, to his uncle, Cotton, on whose death he repaired to another uncle, Thomas Cotton (1653–1730), presbyterian minister at Dyott Street, Bloomsbury. For a short time he was chaplain to 'the Lady Susannah Lort' at Turnham Green, preaching also the Sunday evening lecture at Dyott Street. In 1705 he was chosen assistant to Benjamin Grosvenor at Crosby Square, and undertook in addition (1706) a Sunday evening lecture at St. Thomas's Chapel, Southwark, with Harman Hood. On the death (25 January 1708) of Matthew Sylvester, he accepted the charge of 'a handful of people' at Meeting House Court, Knightrider Street, and was ordained on 15 April; his "confession of faith" was appended to The Ministerial Office (1708), by Daniel Williams.

Wright's ministry was successful: the meeting-house was twice enlarged, if wrecked by the Sacheverell riots in 1710. He was elected a Sunday lecturer at Little St. Helen's. His Calvinistic orthodoxy was unimpeachable, but, probably influenced by Grosvenor, he took (1719) the side of non-subscription at the Salters' Hall conference. He contributed also to the Occasional Papers (1716–19), the organ of whig dissent. Popular, he was chosen (1724) one of the Salters' Hall lecturers, and elected (1724) a trustee of Dr. Williams's Foundations. On 1 May 1729 the diploma of D.D. was granted to him by Edinburgh University. In 1732–3 he had a sermon debate with Thomas Mole (d. 1780) on the foundation of virtue, which Wright could trace no higher than to the divine will.

A new meeting-house was built for Wright in Carter Lane, Doctors' Commons (opened 7 December 1734; removed in 1860). Among Protestant dissenters he ranked as a presbyterian; his will explains his separation from "the common parochial worship" as an act of service to "catholic christianity". His delivery was striking; it is said that Thomas Herring attended his services, as samples of effective utterance. His communion services were known for fervour, and he was a sedulous pastor. Hughes admits a "particular turn of temper" which was not always agreeable. Satiric verses (1735?) describing London dissenting divines open with the lines:

Behold how papal Wright with lordly pride
Directs his haughty eye to either side,
Gives forth his doctrine with imperious nod,
And fraught with pride addresses e'en his God

Thomas Newman (1692–1758) was his assistant and successor. His portrait, in Dr. Williams's Library (engraving in Wilson), is one of the few portraits of dissenting divines vested in the Scottish doctor's gown. He married (1710) the widow of Sylvester, his predecessor, daughter of George Hughes, and had issue one daughter.

Hughes gives a list (revised by Wilson) of forty-three publications by Wright (nearly all sermons), adding that he published several anonymous pieces. The most notable are:

1. 'A Little Treatise of being Born Again ... Four Sermons,' 1715, 12mo; 17th edit. 1761, 16mo.
2. 'A Treatise on the Deceitfulness of Sin,' 1726, 8vo.
3. 'Human Virtues,' 1730, 8vo.
4. 'Charity in all its Branches,' 1731, 8vo.
5. 'The Great Concern of Human Life,' 1732, 8vo; 3rd edit. 1733, 8vo.

He was one of the continuators of the unfinished commentary of Matthew Henry, his part being St. James's Epistle.

== Personal ==
Wright was the eldest son of James Wright, born at Retford, Nottinghamshire, on 30 January 1683. His grandfather was John Wright (d. 1 Feb. 1684–5). After long illness, he became a nonconformist through the influence of William Cotton, a wealthy ironmaster of Wortley, near Sheffield, whose daughter Elinor (d. 1695) he married. He died on 3 April 1746, and was buried in the south aisle of Stoke Newington church, where is a Latin inscription (by Hughes) to his memory. Funeral sermons were preached by his brother-in-law Obadiah Hughes, and John Milner of Peckham.

His father, James Wright (d. 1694), was educated at Lincoln College, Oxford (B.A. 1669), and Magdalene College, Cambridge (M.A. in December 1673). He preached at Attercliffe and Retford as a nonconformist.
