= William Harris (Presbyterian minister) =

English Presbyterian minister

William Harris, D.D. (c.1675 – 25 May 1740) was an English Presbyterian minister.

== Life ==
William Harris was born in about 1675, probably in Southwark, where his mother was living as a widow in 1692. Walter Wilson, following Josiah Thompson, thinks he was educated at Timothy Jollie's Attercliffe Academy, near Sheffield (opened in 1689). Records of the presbyterian board show that in 1692–1696 he studied successively in the academies of John Southwell at Newbury, Berkshire, and James Waters at Uxbridge, Middlesex.

He began early to preach, and was some time assistant (unordained) to Henry Read at Gravel Lane, Southwark. On Read's death (1698) Harris was called to succeed Timothy Cruso at Crutched Friars, in spite of some opposition, and received presbyterian ordination. He served there until his death.

He became a hoarse-voiced leader of liberal dissent. For over thirty years (from 1708) he acted as one of the Friday evening lecturers at the Weighhouse, Eastcheap. He was one of the original trustees (1716) of Daniel Williams's foundations. At the Salters' Hall debates in 1719, he sided with the non-subscribers. In 1723 he was one of the original distributors of the English regium donum.

On 12 April 1727 he succeeded William Tong in the merchants' lecture at Salters' Hall. He received the honorary degree of Doctor of Divinity from the University of Edinburgh on 8 November 1728; and a similar honour from the University of Aberdeen. Nathaniel Lardner was his colleague in his pastoral charge from 1729; an earlier colleague was John Billingsley the younger (1657–1722).

== Death and legacy ==
Harris died, following a short illness, on 25 May 1740, and was buried (in 30 May) in Daniel Williams's vault at Bunhill Fields burial ground. Funeral sermons were preached by his friend Benjamin Grosvenor and by Lardner. He left nearly 2,000 volumes to Dr Williams's Library. His portrait was also presented to the library by Lardner's executor in 1768: an engraving based on it is published in Wilson's Dissenting Churches.

== Works ==
Harris published much, and, according to Walter Wilson, ranked as "the greatest master of the English tongue among the dissenters". Among his works are:

- Exposition of the Epistles to Philippians and Colossians, in the continuation of Matthew Henry's "Exposition", 1710
- Practical Discourses on … Representations of the Messiah, throughout the Old Testament, 1724; intended as a reply to Anthony Collins
- Memoirs of … Thomas Manton, D.D., 1725
- Funeral Discourses, 1736
- A practical Illustration of the Book of Esther, 1737
- Four Discourses upon … the Lord's Supper, 1737

Besides other writings, Wilson gives a list of 38 individual sermons, the earliest in 1702, including 11 funeral and three ordination sermons.
