= Joshua Oldfield =

English presbyterian divine

Joshua Oldfield (2 December 1656 – 8 November 1729) was an English Presbyterian minister.

== Early life ==
He was the second son of John Oldfield or Otefield, and was born at Carsington, Derbyshire, on 2 December 1656. His father gave him his early training; he studied philosophy at Lincoln College, Oxford, and also at Christ's College, Cambridge, under Ralph Cudworth and Henry More (1614–1687). Refusing subscription, he did not graduate. He began life as chaplain to Sir John Gell (d 1689) of Hopton Hall, Derbyshire. Next he was tutor to a son of Paul Foley, afterwards speaker of the House of Commons. Foley offered him a living, but, after deliberation, he resolved to remain a nonconformist.

== Career ==
He then became chaplain, in Pembrokeshire, to Susan, daughter of John Holles, second earl of Clare, and widow of Sir John Lort. He crossed to Dublin, but declined an engagement there. Returning to England, he was for a short time assistant to John Turner (died 1692), an ejected Presbyterian, then ministering in Fetter Lane. He received presbyterian ordination, with three others, at Mansfield on 18 March 1687, his father and his uncle Richard Porter taking part in the ceremony. Shortly afterwards he became the first pastor of a Presbyterian congregation at Tooting, Surrey, said to have been partly founded by Defoe.

Before February 1691 he had become minister of the Presbyterian congregation at Oxford, where he renewed an intimacy with Edmund Calamy, begun at Tooting. He had "a small auditory and very slender encouragement, but took a great deal of pains". He was shy at making friends with undergraduates; Calamy used to get him to meet them at the coffee-house, when "they found he had a great deal more in him than they imagined". With Henry Dodwell the elder and John Wallis, he formed friendships. At Oxford he took part in a public discussion on infant baptism, which considerably raised his reputation.

In 1694 he moved to Coventry as co-pastor with William Tong of the Presbyterian congregation at the Leather Hall. Here he started (before May 1695) an academy for training students for the ministry, in which Tong gave him some help. On 6 October 1697 he was cited to the ecclesiastical court for public teaching without license from the bishop. The case went from Coventry to Lichfield, and in November Oldfield went up to London and obtained a stay of ecclesiastical proceedings, transferring the suit to the king's bench. Here it was argued for several terms; but Oldfield got the matter laid before William III, and the suit was dropped on an intimation from the king that "he was not pleas'd with such prosecutions".

Oldfield left Coventry in 1699 to succeed Thomas Kentish as minister at Globe Alley, Maid Lane, Southwark, a charge previously held by his brother Nathaniel. He brought his academy with him, and maintained it, first in Southwark, afterwards at Hoxton Square, where he was assisted by William Lorimer (1641–1722) and John Spademan, and (after 1708) by Jean Cappel, who had held the Hebrew chair at Saumur. Nathaniel Lardner was for a short time at this academy in 1699 (perhaps also between 1703 and 1709). It gained the highest repute among dissenters. Early in his London career Oldfield became intimate with Locke, who was then engaged on his (posthumous) work on the Pauline epistles. He made the acquaintance also of Sir Isaac Newton, who thought highly of his mathematical powers. On 2 May 1709, during Calamy's visit to Scotland, the degree of D.D. by diploma was conferred by Edinburgh University on Calamy, Daniel Williams, and Oldfield. By Williams's will (1711), Oldfield was appointed an original trustee of his numerous foundations.

Oldfield preached the funeral sermon (1716) for Robert Fleming the younger, the pioneer of the non-subscription principle. At the Salters' Hall conference Oldfield was chosen moderator (19 February 1719), retained the chair after the secession of the subscribers, and signed the official letter in which the non-subscribers ‘utterly disown the Arian doctrine,’ and maintain the doctrine of the Trinity and the proper divinity of our Lord. Lorimer, his colleague in the academy, was chosen moderator of the seceding subscribers, of whom Tong, his former colleague, now minister at Salters' Hall, was a strong supporter. It has been suggested that Oldfield's sympathies were on the same side, though as moderator he was bound to register the decision of the majority. This is not borne out by his general attitude, nor by his ruling on 3 March, which was the immediate occasion of the split. His personal orthodoxy is placed beyond question by his pamphlet of 1721, but he underrated the consequences of the division.

Oldfield had Benjamin Grosvenor, D.D., as his assistant at Globe Alley from 1700 till 1704. He then took the whole duty; but his congregation dwindled, till in 1721 it was revived by the appointment of Obadiah Hughes, as co-pastor. In April 1723 Oldfield was made one of the original agents for the distribution of the English regium donum. Late in life he had an apoplectic seizure, fell, and lost an eye. Otherwise he had good health, and under all reverses was patient and cheerful.

He died on 8 November 1729, and was buried in Bunhill Fields burial ground. Funeral sermons were preached by William Harris, and by Hughes.

== Publications ==
Oldfield published five separate sermons, including a thanksgiving sermon for the union with Scotland (1707) and a funeral sermon for Fleming (1716); also:

- Christ the head of civil government; for the Reformation of Manners (1699)
- An Essay towards the Improvement of Human Reason in the Pursuit of Learning and Conduct of Life (1707)
- A Brief, Practical and Pacific Discourse of God; and of the Father, Son, and Spirit (1721); 2nd edition with appendix, same year

== Portraits ==
At Dr Williams's Library, London, are a crayon portrait of him, and an oil painting, which is engraved in Walter Wilson's Dissenting Churches.
