= Benjamin Grosvenor (minister) =

English nonconformist minister

Benjamin Grosvenor D.D. (also Gravenor or Gravener; 1 January 1676 – 27 October 1758) was an English dissenting minister.

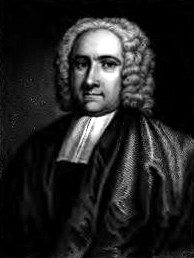
Benjamin Grosvenor

== Life ==
He was born in London on 1 January 1676; his father, Charles Gravener, a prosperous upholsterer, lived at the Black Swan on Watling Street. However, Charles experienced financial difficulties later in life and was supported by his son. In 1710, his son altered the spelling of his name to Gravenor, and later to Grosvenor (first used in 1712, but not finally adopted until 1716).

He was deeply influenced by a sermon he heard at Gravel Lane Southwark. At the age of 14, he was baptized by Benjamin Keach and subsequently admitted to his Particular Baptist congregation in Goat Yard Passage, Horselydown. Keach then encouraged him to pursue ministry.

In 1693, Gravener was enrolled at Attercliffe Academy under the guidance of Timothy Jollie. During his time there, Grosvenor's religious views shifted towards Presbyterianism, particularly concerning ordination practices. Upon returning to London in 1695, he studied under private tutors and learned Hebrew from Cappel, a Huguenot refugee. However, he was eventually dismissed from membership of his Baptist church.

=== Early career ===
In 1699, Grosvenor underwent examination and licensing by seven Presbyterian ministers, including Robert Fleming the younger, and became assistant to Joshua Oldfield at Globe Alley in Maid Lane, Southwark. The following year, he was considered for the succession to Matthew Mead in the Independent congregation at Stepney. However, his excommunication by the Baptists may have influenced his chances for this position.

In 1702, a Sunday evening lecture for young men was started at the Old Jewry meeting-house, with Gravener and Samuel Rosewell appointed as lecturers. Gravener's reputation as a preacher grew, and following the death of Samuel Slater on 24 May 1704, he was chosen as pastor of the Presbyterian congregation in Crosby Square and he was ordained on 11 July 1704. Under his leadership, the congregation flourished and became increasingly prominent, successfully raising funds for its activities. Samuel Wright (1683–1746) was his assistant from 1705 to 1708. His later assistants included John Barker (1708–14), Clerk Oldisworth (1715–26), and lastly Edmund Calamy IV (1726–49).

=== Later years ===
Grosvenor resigned the Old Jewry lectureship soon after his appointment at Crosby Square. He was for some years one of the preachers of the Friday evening lecture at the Weigh House, begun (1707) by Thomas Bradbury In 1716 he succeeded Robert Fleming as a preacher of the "merchants' lecture" on Tuesday mornings at Salters' Hall.

In 1723 Grosvenor was elected a trustee of Dr. Williams's foundations. An operation for the removal of the uvula in 1726 somewhat affected his pronunciation. On 29 May 1730 the university of Edinburgh made him D.D. At Salters' Hall he lectured against popery in 1735, taking persecution as his theme; and he was active in the Old Whig, run 1735–8 by Benjamin Avery. In 1749 he resigned his congregation and his lectureship.

Grosvenor's religious position was one of mutual toleration; in his own theology he remained a moderate Calvinist.

He died on 27 August 1758, and was buried in Bunhill Fields; his funeral sermon was preached by John Barker.

He left a bequest to the Presbyterian Fund, and his library to Warrington Academy.

== Works ==
In 1716 Grosvenor was concerned in the periodic issue of the Occasional Papers, known also as the "Bagweell" papers; the first on "Bigotry" was by Grosvenor. This serial continued till 1719, and was influential on the subject of religious liberty, and with the non-subscribing majority at Salters' Hall in 1719. Only one of the eight members of the "Bagweell" fraternity, Jabez Earle, was a subscriber there, another, Joshua Bayes, remaining neutral. Grosvenor is said to have drawn up the Authentick Account (1719) of the Salters' Hall proceedings, the first of the many pamphlets issued by the non-subscribing ministers, with a list of names.

Of Grosvenor's other publications, Walter Wilson enumerated 27, most of them single sermons, including funeral sermons. Among them were:

- A Confession of Faith, 1704 (at his ordination).
- The Temper of Jesus, 1712, (sermon on Luke xxiv. 47).
- A Sermon Preach'd to a Society of Young Men in Jewen-Street, October the 0Th, 1719
- Observations on Sudden Death, 1720.
- Preparation for Death, the Best Preservative Against the Plague: Being the Substance of Two Sermons, 1721
- The Mourner, 1731; 18th edition, 1804.
- Health, an Essay on its Nature, 1716, 2nd edition, 1748.

His Sermons, now first collected in a volume (1809) were edited by John Davies, with preface by David Bogue.

== Family ==
By his first marriage (1703) to Mary South (died November 1707), daughter of Captain Henry South of Bethnal Green, Grosvenor had a son, Benjamin South Grosvenor, who died many years before his father, and a daughter, who died in infancy.

By his second marriage (1712) to Elizabeth Prince he had four sons; only the youngest survived him.

== Notes ==
Attribution

This article incorporates text from a publication now in the public domain: Stephen, Leslie; Lee, Sidney, eds. (1890). "Grosvenor, Benjamin". Dictionary of National Biography. Vol. 23. London: Smith, Elder & Co.
