= Rathmell Academy =

Dissenting academy in Northern England

Rathmell Academy was a Dissenting academy set up at Rathmell, North Yorkshire, and was the oldest non-conformist seat of learning in the north of England. The academy was established in 1670 by Richard Frankland M.A. (Christ's College, Cambridge), and which was carried on, in spite of much persecution and many changes of venue, for nearly 30 years.

== Preparations ==
Efforts were being made by the nonconformists of the north to secure the educational advantages offered for a short time by the Durham College. William Pell, who had been a fellow of Magdalene College, Cambridge, and a tutor at Durham, declined to start an academic institution, holding himself precluded by his graduation oath from resuming collegiate lectures outside the ancient universities. Application was then successfully made to Frankland, who was not hindered by the same scruple. Nonconformist tutors usually understood the oath as referring to prelections in order to a degree.

== Beginnings ==
Early in March 1669 Frankland began to receive students at Rathmell. His first student was George, youngest son of Sir Thomas Liddell, bart., of Ravensworth Castle, Durham, head of a family distinguished for its loyalty, though marked by puritan leanings. Some of Frankland's students were intended for the legal, others for the medical profession; his first divinity students belonged to the independent denomination. It was not till the Royal Declaration of Indulgence of 1672, from which Edward Stillingfleet dates the presbyterian separation, that divinity students connected with that body were sent to Rathmell, and the earliest nonconformist ‘academy’ (as distinct from a mere school) became an important institution and the model of others. In the first four years he received 15 pupils, six of whom became nonconformist ministers.

The course of studies in this ‘northern academy’ included ‘logic, metaphysics, somatology, pneumatology, natural philosophy, divinity, and chronology.’ The lectures were in Latin, and given by Frankland until he had trained up assistants, among whom were John Issot, Richard Frankland (the tutor's son) and John Owen. The discipline of the house was strict, but Frankland always succeeded in gaining the confidence of his students, and maintained his authority with ‘admirable temper.’ Morning prayers were at seven, winter and summer; lectures were over by noon, but solitary study went on after dinner till six o'clock prayers, and supper was followed by discussion of the day's work, unhampered by the tutor's presence. Those who wished to graduate went on to Scotland, where they were promoted to a degree after one session's attendance. The total number of Frankland's students was 304; among the best known of his divinity students are William Tong (entered 2 March 1681), Joshua Bayes and John Evans, D.D. (entered 26 May 1697), leaders of the presbyterian interest in London. John Disney (1677–1730) entered as a law student on 5 July 1695. The ministry of dissent in the north of England was chiefly recruited from Frankland's academy, as the ejected of 1662 gradually died out. James Wood, minister of Chowbent Chapel, was a student of the academy.

== Migrations ==
The academy underwent six migrations from place to place. From Rathmell it moved to Natland, near Kendal, in Westmoreland, in early 1674. Early in 1683 the enforcement of the Five Mile Act compelled him to leave Natland as being too near to Kendal. He transferred his academy to Calton Hall, the seat of the Lamberts, in the parish of Kirkby Malham, West Yorkshire, and in 1684 to Dawson Fold in Westmoreland, just outside the five-miles radius from Kendal. In 1685 (a year in which two of his former students were imprisoned at York, and the only year in which his academy received no accessions) he retired to Hart Barrow, near to Cartmel Fell, just inside the Lancashire border, and so convenient for escaping a writ for either county. Late in 1686 Frankland availed himself of James II's arbitrary exercise of the dispensing power by taking out a fifty shilling dispensation, and removed to Attercliffe, a suburb of Sheffield, Yorkshire. He left Attercliffe at the end of July 1689, in consequence of the death of his favourite son, and returned to Rathmell.

His pupil Timothy Jollie, independent minister at Sheffield, began another academy at Attercliffe on a more restricted principle than Frankland's, excluding mathematics ‘as tending to scepticism.’

== Troubles ==
Frankland carried his academy with him back to Rathmell, and during the remaining nine years of his life he admitted nearly as many students as in the whole previous period of over nineteen years. His congregation also throve, and he maintained harmony among its members at a time when many were beginning to relax their hold of the Calvinism to which he himself adhered. But while the Toleration Act 1688 protected him as a preacher, hardly a year passed without some fresh attempt on the part of the authorities to put down his academy. In 1692 the clergy of Craven petitioned archbishop John Sharp to suppress the academy. Sharp wrote to John Tillotson for advice. Tillotson evidently did not like the business, and suggested to Sharp (14 June 1692), as ‘the fairest and softest way of ridding’ his ‘hands of’ it, that he should see Frankland and explain that the objection to licensing his academy was not based upon his nonconformity. His school was not required in the district, and it was contrary to the bishop's oath to license public instruction in ‘university learning.’ Edmund Calamy states that his troubles continued till the year of his death, but no further particulars are available. Oliver Heywood's diaries are full of references to the academy and its students, and to Frankland's labours at ordinations.
