= John Chorlton =

English presbyterian minister and tutor (1666–1705)

John Chorlton (1666 – 16 May 1705, Manchester) was an English presbyterian minister and tutor.

== Life ==
John Chorlton was born at Salford, in 1666. On 4 April 1682 he was admitted to be educated for the ministry at Rathmell Academy under Richard Frankland. On completing his studies he was chosen (7 August 1687) as assistant to Henry Newcome, the founder of nonconformity in Manchester. On 8 March 1689, he married Hannah, daughter of Joseph Leeche.

On Newcome's death (17 September 1695) he became pastor. The congregation on 14 October 1695 invited Oliver Heywood to become his colleague, but the old man declined to leave Northowram. An assistant was obtained (1697) by the name of Gaskeld. After pleasing the Manchester Presbyterians with his learning and eloquence, Gaskeld disappeared with a borrowed horse, made his way to Hull (where he called himself Midgely, and falsely represented himself as one of the authors of Letters Writ by a Turkish Spy), and finally fled to Holland.

On Frankland's death (1 October 1698) at Rathmell, Chorlton resolved to continue Frankland's 'northern academy', transferring it to Manchester. Accordingly, on 21 March 1699 he ‘set up teaching university learning in a house at Manchester.’ Eleven of Frankland's students finished their course with him, and the names of twenty others who studied under him are known. His most no student was Thomas Dixon. The writings of James Clegg, one of the transferred students, is used as a reliable source on the mode in which the academy was conducted. He describes Chorlton as a worthy successor to Frankland, and superior as a preacher. Matthew Henry speaks of his ‘extraordinary quickness and readiness of expression; a casuist, one of a thousand, a wonderful clear head.’

In 1699, he and James Owen of Oswestry wrote a tract affirming that no Dissenting congregation, within his knowledge, would admit a Socinian to communion.

By this time Chorlton now wanted assistance both in the pulpit and in the academy. Applications were made in 1699 to James Owen and Thomas Bradbury, both of whom declined. Next year the services of James Coningham were secured. The ‘provincial meeting’ of Lancashire ministers gave a public character to the academy, passing resolutions in its favour and raising funds for its support. At the summer assizes of 1703 Chorlton was presented for keeping a public academy, but through private influence the prosecution was stayed.

Chorlton's labours were cut short in his prime. He suffered from stone, and died in his fortieth year on 16 May 1705, and was buried at the collegiate church (now Manchester Cathedral) on 19 May.

== Works ==
- (Anon.) Notes upon the Lord Bishop of Salisbury's four Discourses to the Clergy of his Diocess … relating to the Dissenters, 1695.
- The Glorious Reward of Faithful Ministers, 1696. Funeral sermon [Dan. xii. 3] for Henry Newcome. Robert Halley reckoned it "one of the best of the nonconformist funeral sermons". Preface by John Howe.
- (Anon.) Dedication to Lord Willoughby, and Brief Account of the Life of the Author, prefixed to Henry Pendlebury's Invisible Realities, 1696.

== See also ==
- Cross Street Chapel
