= William Tong (minister) =

English Presbyterian minister

William Tong (1662–1727) was an English Presbyterian minister, at the heart of the subscription debate of 1718.

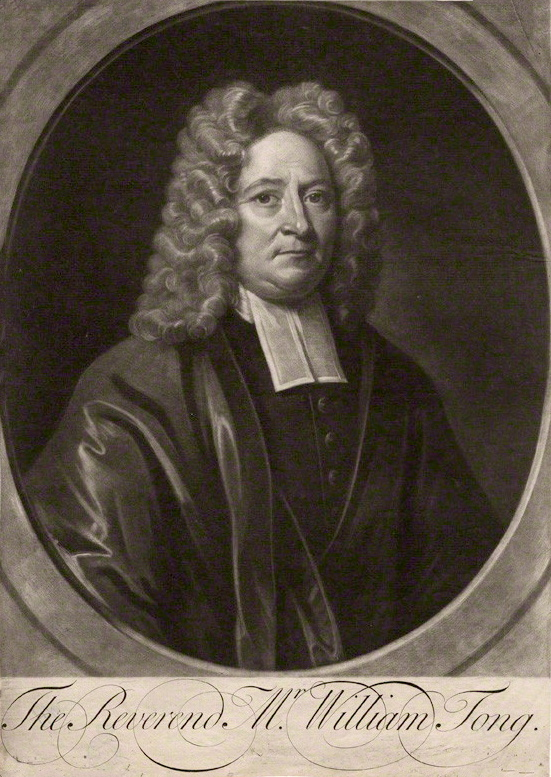
William Tong, engraving by John Simon from a portrait by John Wollaston.

== Life ==
He was born on 24 June 1662, probably at Eccles near Manchester, where his father (a relative of Robert Warton Hall) was buried. His mother was early left a widow with three children. Tong began his education with a view to the law, but his mother's influence turned him to the ministry. He entered the Rathmell Academy of Richard Frankland, then at Natland, on 2 March 1681, and was Frankland's most distinguished student.

Early in 1685 he was licensed to preach. For two years he acted as chaplain in Shropshire to Thomas Corbet of Stanwardine and Rowland Hunt of Boreatton, becoming acquainted with Philip Henry. Until threatened with prosecution, he preached occasionally at the chapel of Cockshut, in the parish of Ellesmere. At the beginning of March 1687 he took a three months' engagement at Chester, pending the arrival of Matthew Henry. His services were conducted, noon and night, in the house of Anthony Henthorn; and were so successful that they were then transferred to a large outbuilding.

From Chester he was called to be the first pastor of a newly formed dissenting congregation at Knutsford, Cheshire. He was ordained on 4 November 1687, and procured the building of the existing meeting-house in Brook Street (opened 1688–9). On the deaths (22 October 1689) of Obadiah Grew, and Jarvis Bryan (27 December 1689), he was called to be co-pastor with Thomas Shewell (died 19 Jan. 1693) at the Great Meeting-house, Coventry. Here he ministered for nearly thirteen years from 1690. He had as colleagues, after Shewell, Joshua Oldfield and John Warren (died 15 September 1742). He escaped the prosecutions which were brought against Oldfield, though he assisted him in academy teaching, and the bursaries from the presbyterian fund were paid through him.

On the death of Nathaniel Taylor (April 1702), after overtures had been made to Josiah Chorley and Matthew Henry, Tong was elected pastor of the presbyterian congregation in Salters' Hall Court, Cannon Street, London, John Newman (1677?–1741) being retained as his assistant. The congregation was large, and the most wealthy among London dissenters. The central position of its meeting-house made it convenient for lectures and for joint meetings of dissenters. Tong was soon elected to succeed John Howe as one of the four preachers of the ‘merchants' lecture’ on Tuesday mornings at Salters' Hall.

He took a prominent part in the controversy arising out of the alleged heresies of James Peirce of Exeter. His steps were cautious. An undated letter of March or April 1718 by Thomas Secker mentions that on a proposal in the presbyterian fund to increase the grant to Hubert Stogdon, Tong ‘was silent for some time and then went out’. On 25 August 1718 a conference of twenty-five presbyterian and independent ministers, with Benjamin Robinson as moderator, was held at Salters' Hall. They endorsed a letter (drafted by Tong) to John Walrond (died 1755), minister of Ottery St Mary, Devon, affirming that they would not ordain any candidates unsound on the Trinity. In the conferences of the following year, ending in a rupture, Tong was a leader of the subscribing party . His introduction to ‘The Doctrine of the … Trinity stated and defended … by four subscribing Ministers,’ 1719, puts his case.

As one of the original trustees of the foundations of Daniel Williams, Tong had, from 1721, a share in the task of carrying these benefactions into effect. He was also one of the first distributors (1723) of the English regium donum, and a trustee (1726) of the Barnes bequest. In his last years his powers declined. His end was rather sudden. He died on 21 March 1727.

== Works ==
His major works are his contributions to nonconformist history:

- ‘A Brief Historical Account of Nonconformity,’ appended to his ‘Defence,’ 1693, of Matthew Henry on Schism (1689).
- ‘An Account of the Life … of … Matthew Henry,’ 1716.
- ‘Memoirs of John Shower,’ 1716.
- ‘Dedication,’ containing a sketch of nonconformist history in Coventry, prefixed to John Warren's funeral sermon for Joshua Merrell, 1716.

His published sermons include funeral sermons for Samuel Slater and Elizabeth Bury. He revised Matthew Henry's ‘Memoirs’ of Philip Henry, 1698, and prepared the expositions of Hebrews and Revelation for Matthew Henry's ‘Commentary.’

== Notes ==
Attribution

This article incorporates text from a publication now in the public domain: "Tong, William". Dictionary of National Biography. London: Smith, Elder & Co. 1885–1900.
