= Attercliffe Academy =

Attercliffe Academy was a Dissenting academy set up in the north of England by Timothy Jollie.

Richard Frankland had founded Rathmell Academy at Rathmell, but was forced to move several times. The school moved to Attercliffe, a suburb of Sheffield, Yorkshire, leaving it at the end of July 1689, in consequence of the death of his favourite son, and returning to Rathmell. His pupil Timothy Jollie, independent minister at Sheffield, began another academy at Attercliffe on a more restricted principle than Frankland's, excluding mathematics ‘as tending to scepticism.
