= Tom Prescott =

English footballer

Personal information
- Full name: Thomas George Prescott
- Date of birth: 8 January 1875
- Place of birth: Attercliffe, England
- Date of death: 1957 (aged 81–82)
- Position: Full back

Senior career*
Years	Team	Apps	(Gls)
1890–1891	Liverpool East End		
1891–1892	Hamilton Athletic		
1892–1893	Crosse		
1893–1896	Liverpool South End		
1896–1905	Notts County	212	(1)
Total		212	(1)
- * Club domestic league appearances and goals

Thomas George Prescott (8 January 1875 – 1957) was an English footballer who played in the Football League for Notts County.
