= Dissenting academies =

Nonconformist school or college in England and Wales

The dissenting academies were schools, colleges and seminaries (often institutions with aspects of all three) run by English Dissenters, that is, Protestants who did not conform to the Church of England. They formed a significant part of education in England from the mid-seventeenth to nineteenth centuries.

== Background ==
After the Uniformity Act 1662, for about two centuries, it was difficult for anyone except practising members of the Church of England to gain degrees from Cambridge and Oxford universities. The University of Oxford, in particular, required - until the Oxford University Act 1854 - a religious test on admission that was comparable to that for joining the Church. At the University of Cambridge a statutory test was required to take a bachelor's degree.

English Dissenters in this context were Nonconformist Protestants who could not in good conscience subscribe (i.e. conform) to the beliefs of the Church of England. As they were debarred from taking degrees in the only two English universities, many of them attended the dissenting academies. If they could afford it, they completed their education at the universities of Leyden, Utrecht, Glasgow or Edinburgh, the last, particularly, those who were studying medicine or law. Many students attending Utrecht were supported by the Presbyterian Fund.

While the religious reasons mattered most, the geography of university education also was a factor. The plans for a Durham College of Oliver Cromwell provided an attempt to break the educational monopoly of Oxbridge, and while it failed because of the political change in 1660, the founder of Rathmell Academy was Richard Frankland, who may have been involved in the Durham College project. Almost as soon as dissenting academies began to appear, Frankland was backed by those who wished to see an independent university-standard education available in the north of England.

Tutors in the academies were initially drawn from the ejected ministers of 1662, who had left the Church of England after the passing of the Uniformity Act, and many of whom had English university degrees. After that generation, some tutors did not have those academic credentials to support their reputations, although in many cases other universities, particularly the Scottish institutions that were sympathetic to their Presbyterian views, awarded them honorary doctorates.

== Funding ==
There were several sources of funding. Some of these funds gave their trustees the option of sending young men either to dissenting academies, or to universities abroad. An academy, to attract such students, had to offer a course of instruction approved of by the Board for its purposes. Funding might be central or local, and there could be doctrinal as well as practical reasons why a given academy was sent students with financial support.

The Common Fund Board, founded in 1689, gave scholarships to Presbyterian and Congregational candidates for the ministry; its successor, the Presbyterian Fund Board, continued into the middle of the nineteenth century. An education at a dissenting academy was not the only option for the Fund Board, since a candidate could also be sponsored at a Scottish university, or elsewhere. A gap opened up between the Presbyterians and Congregationalists, as the Independents started to be called, for reasons of doctrine.

The Independent or Congregational Fund Board was established in 1695 to assist poor ministers, and to give young men who had already received a classical education, the theological and other training preparatory to the Christian ministry.

An early sign of the division between Presbyterians and Independents was the fate of the Rathmell Academy after the death of Frankland in 1698: it migrated to Manchester under John Chorlton, while another academy under Timothy Jollie, an Independent, operated at Attercliffe (one of the locations of Frankland's migratory academy) from the 1690s onwards.

In 1730, the King's Head Society was founded by laymen in London who were dissatisfied with the management of the Congregational Fund Board. (It took its name from the pub behind the Royal Exchange at which they met). The chief point of objection was the Fund Academies' rule which limited students to those who had already passed through a classical training, including the demanding and lengthy training period required for learning to read Greek and Latin texts. The founders of the King's Head Society resolved to found an academy with a six years' course, where young men, without a general classical education, would receive it during the first two years and could then proceed to the usual classical-theological course.

These academies were funded partly by fees for tuition and lodging, as many of them were run in large houses as boarding establishments. They were also funded by philanthropic Dissenters such as William Coward (1647–1738), whose "will set up a trust fund 'for the education and training up of young men ... to qualify them for the ministry of the gospel among the Protestant Dissenters', thus continuing the financial support he had given to such students in his lifetime". Sometimes this funding was organised along the lines of subscribers. The Coward Trust from 1743 funded Daventry Academy and a London academy under David Jennings, but was distinct from the ordinary Congregational funding.

== Legal position ==
The letter of the law could make the running of a dissenting academy difficult or impossible. In the general framework according to which schools must be licensed by the bishop, and ministers (who made up most of the teaching staff) could be in legal trouble for the activities that held together their congregations, some academies simply shut down. For a short period (1714 to 1719) the Schism Act 1714 was in force, and aimed precisely to do that; but the troubles of the academies were mostly before this legislation.

Proceedings in ecclesiastical courts were quite common in the seventeenth century, for example in the case of the tutor Benjamin Robinson. The degree of religious toleration in the later half of the seventeenth century varied considerably according to laws passed by Parliament, and also in line with the public mood. Some academies, such as that of John Shuttlewood, operated in remote areas of the countryside, and some tutors were required to leave towns where they had previously performed their ministry, for example under the Five Mile Act. The Toleration Act 1688 under the reign of William III and Mary II did not mention the dissenters' academies, and proceedings continued against dissenting tutors throughout the 1690s. There were also cases of actions against dissenting grammar schools, for example the proceedings against Isaac Gilling in the 1710s. In 1723 the regium donum, initially a grant to support Irish Presbyterians, was expanded into England. Subsequently dissenting academies were more generally accepted.

== Nature of the academies ==
Several early academies became associated with particular theological positions. Richard Frankland of Rathmell Academy and Timothy Jollie of Attercliffe, founders of two of the most celebrated early academies, opposed any departure from Calvinist theology. It was rumoured that Jollie even forbade mathematics "as tending to scepticism and infidelity", although several of his students later became extremely proficient in the mathematics.

Some academies were more broadminded in their teaching methodology, and in their attitudes towards possible methods of church governance. Indeed, several students at dissenting academies later became Anglicans. The dissenters themselves argued that their academies had stricter discipline than the universities, and were perceived by many to have promoted a more contemporary curriculum based on the practical sciences and modern history. In some of the larger academies French and High Dutch (German) were taught. The tutors and the students of the dissenting academies contributed in fundamental ways to the development of ideas, notably in the fields of theology, philosophy, literature, and science.

In the nineteenth century the academies' original purpose to provide a higher education was largely superseded by the founding of the University of London and the provincial universities, which were open to dissenters, and by reform of Oxford and Cambridge.

== Notable examples ==
=== London area ===
Newington Green, in those days a village north of London, had several academies. Charles Morton (1626–1698), the educator and minister who ended his career as vice-president of Harvard College, ran an influential academy; the Oxford Dictionary of National Biography judges Morton's "probably the most impressive of the dissenting academies [prior to 1685], enrolling as many as fifty pupils at a time". The ODNB goes on to describe its advanced and varied curriculum (religion, classics, history, geography, mathematics, natural science, politics, and modern languages) and a well-equipped laboratory, and even "a bowling green for recreation". Lectures were given in English, not Latin, and Daniel Defoe, one of Morton's students, praised its attention to the mother tongue. Samuel Wesley, a contemporary of Defoe's, described his teacher "as universal in his learning", although he also attacked the academy on uncertain grounds for promoting king-killing doctrines. James Burgh, author of The Dignity of Human Nature and Thoughts on Education, opened his dissenting academy there in 1750. (His widow helped Mary Wollstonecraft establish her school in the village.) Anna Laetitia Barbauld, so closely associated with other leading dissenting academies, chose to spend the latter third of her life in Newington Green.

Homerton College, Cambridge started life as the dissenting academy Independent College, Homerton, then another village north of London.

=== West Country ===
The Tewkesbury Academy, set up by Samuel Jones, had as its students both dissenters such as Samuel Chandler and those who became significant establishment figures such as Archbishop of Canterbury Thomas Secker and Joseph Butler.

=== Midlands ===
Philip Doddridge was chosen in 1723 to conduct the academy being newly established at Market Harborough. It moved many times, and was known as Northampton Academy, Doddridge died in 1751 and the academy continued. and is probably best known as Daventry Academy, which Joseph Priestley attended. The academy ended up in London under the name of Coward College, as it was largely supported by the bequest of William Coward who died 1738. The college was one of three that amalgamated in 1850 into New College London. Hugh Farmer was educated at this college in its earlier days.

Sheriffhales Academy, Shropshire (1663–1697) was established under John Woodhouse.

Shrewsbury Academy was started by James Owen in 1702. Owen died 1706 and his place was filled by Samuel Benion. The academy continued until Benion's death in 1708.

=== North of England ===
In 1757, John Seddon, a young minister in Warrington, established the Warrington Academy. Among the tutors were Joseph Priestley (1761–1767) and Johann Reinhold Forster, a German scholar and naturalist. Forster went with Captain Cook in his second voyage round the world. When Warrington Academy closed in 1786, the remaining funds helped found Manchester New College (in Manchester), leading eventually, via York and University Hall, Gordon Square (London) to Harris Manchester College, Oxford.

Rathmell Academy, which had half a dozen homes, was set up by Richard Frankland in 1670. The school moved to Attercliffe, a suburb of Sheffield, Yorkshire, leaving it at the end of July 1689, in consequence of the death of his favourite son, and returning to Rathmell. His pupil Timothy Jollie, independent minister at Sheffield, began Attercliffe Academy, on a more restricted principle than Frankland's, apparently excluding mathematics "as tending to scepticism".

== See also ==
- List of dissenting academies (1660–1800)
- List of dissenting academies (19th century)
- List of Friends schools
- Congregational Board of Education
