= Thomas Cotton (dissenting minister) =

Thomas Cotton (1653–1730) was a dissenting minister of London.

== Life ==
Thomas Cotton was born at Penistone, Yorkshire, 1653. His father, William Cotton (1627–1674), notable Iron-master of Wortley Top Forge, was and Dissenter, noted for his great hospitality and kindness to the ejected ministers. One of these was a John Spawford, ejected from Silkstone in 1662, whom he received into his family as tutor to his son until his death in 1668. Subsequently, Cotton studied successively at Henry Hickman's academy at Stourbridge, in Westmoreland at Richard Frankland's Natland Academy, and at the University of Edinburgh, where he was awarded an M.A. in 1677.

On leaving college, he accepted a position as chaplain to Lady Sarah Houghton, daughter of the Earl of Chesterfield, for about a year, after which ill-health forced him to leave. He then conducted a small chapel at his father's house, until persecution forced him to stop. He then accepted a position as tutor and governor to a young gentleman, and spent three years touring Europe, during which he witnessed the ejection of Protestant ministers at Loudun, Poitou and Saumur, which he later described in the unpublished memoirs of his travels.

Cotton was offered appointments in the Church of England, but chose to remain a Dissenter. He settled first at Hoxton Square, London (1690–95), then Ware in Hertfordshire (1695–99), finally at Dyot Street Chapel, St. Giles’s in the Fields, Bloomsbury (1699–1727). He died in London 11 August 1730.

== Family ==
In 1689, he married Bridget Hoar, with whom he had three children: Leonard (1693–1770; who emigrated to America); Thomas (1710–97), and Alicia (b. 1730). He also adopted his nephew Samuel Wright (1683–1746).

His son Thomas married Rebecca Bayes, daughter of preacher Joshua Bayes.
