= James Wood (minister) =

Reverend James Wood
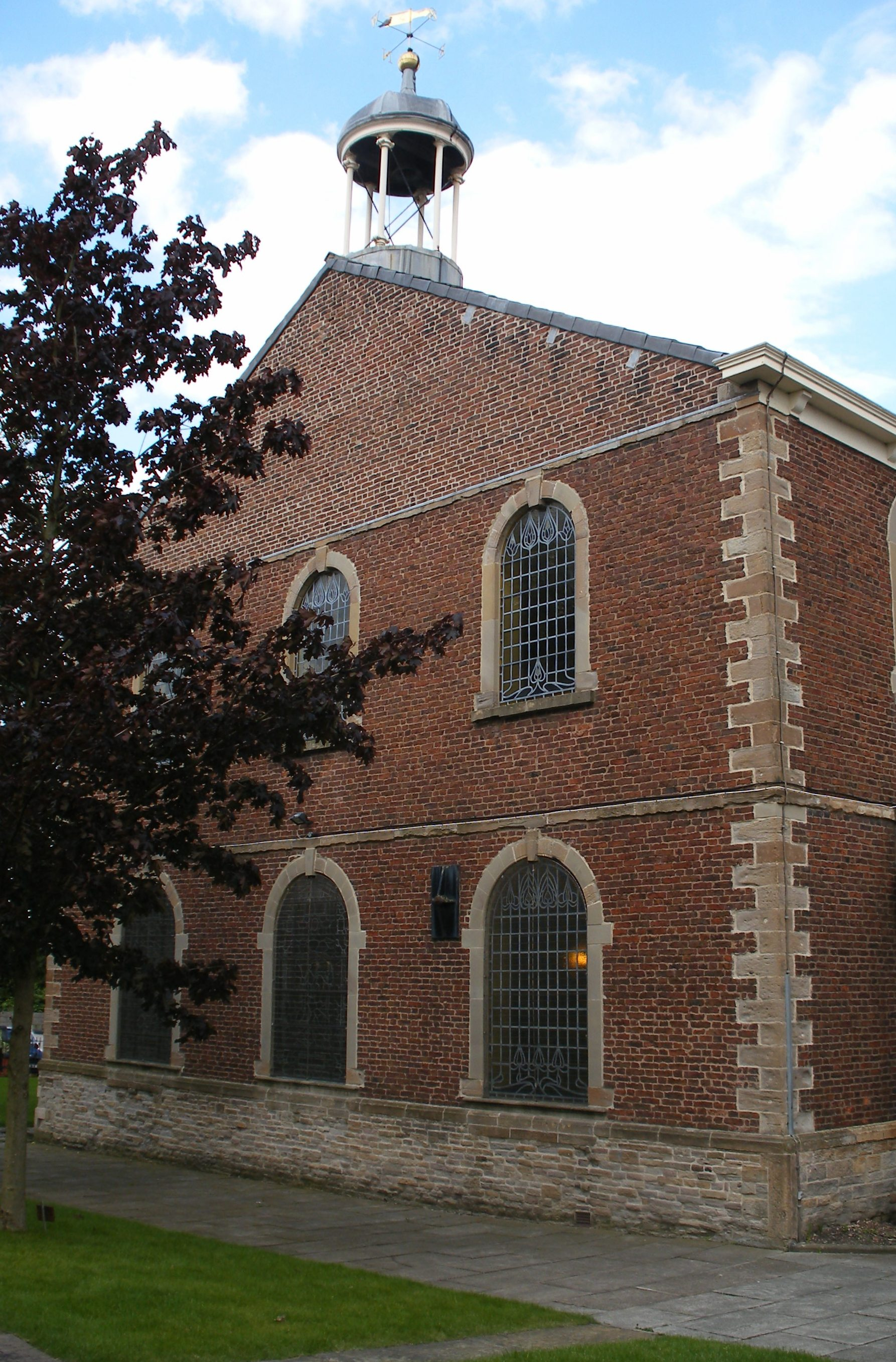
- Chowbent Chapel
- Born: 1672; Atherton, Greater Manchester, England
- Died: 20 February 1759 (aged 86–87)
- Citizenship: United Kingdom
- Education: Rathmell Academy
- Occupation: Minister
- Years active: 1695-1759
- Spouse: Hannah
- Parent(s): James Wood (1639–1694) and Anne Townley
- Relatives: James Wood (Grandfather)
- Religion: Christian
- Church: Presbyterian Church
- Offices held: Minister of the first Atherton and Chowbent Chapels

James Wood (1672–1759) was a Presbyterian minister of the first Atherton and Chowbent Chapels in Atherton, Greater Manchester. During the Jacobite rising, he was given the title "the General" for leading a force of men that routed the Highlanders. He is commemorated on a tablet in the church located in the 'North Wall. Over Pulpit'

== Biography ==
=== Family ===
James Wood was born in Atherton as the son of James Wood (1639–1694), a nonconformist minister of Atherton Chapel, and his wife Anne Townley. In 1670, His father was imprisoned for defying the law and preaching in the homes of sympathisers following the closure of Atherton Chapel by the Act of Uniformity 1662. This act affected his grandfather, James Wood (d. 1667), who was a powerful orator and reformer as he was ejected from the perpetual curacy of Ashton in Makerfield and forbidden from preaching in his church, and was deprived of his living.

=== Early life ===
James was educated by the Reverend Richard Frankland at Rathmell Academy. He assisted his father and succeeded him at Atherton Chapel in 1695.

=== Later Life ===
Wood married his wife Hannah in 1717 at the age of 45 and she died nine years later. The Atherton Estate Survey of 1734 reveals Wood was also a farmer, he occupied a house with an orchard and fields covering 12 Cheshire acres and a smithy which he rented out to a nailor. In 1742, Wood paid his share of the church rate despite many dissenters objecting to paying it.

A description of James was described by a member of his congregation,

"In person he was above the middle size and rather bulky: his appearance in the pulpit was very venerable and striking. He always wore a gown and bands, with a pretty large white wig when performing public worship. His sermons were delivered in a most solemn manner (yet without cant), and made considerable impression on his hearers."

"General" James Wood died in 1759. The location of his grave is unknown, but is speculated to be at Chowbent where his wife and mother are buried. However a tablet stands in the churches' North Wall over a Pulpit, that commemorates him and reads:

This Tablet
is Erected and Inscribed
as a Testimony
of Respect to Perpetuate
the Memory of
the Revd James Wood
whose active exertions
founded this place of
Public Worship
He died February 20th 1759
Having served
This Society as a Christian Minister
With Affection and Fidelity
More than 60 Years

== Battle ==
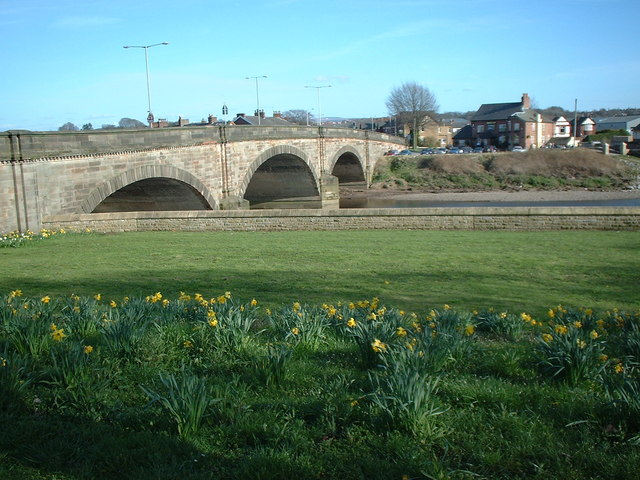
The bridge at Walton le Dale, near Preston

During the Jacobite rising of 1715, supporters of the Old Pretender were marching on Preston, Lancashire. James Wood received a letter from Sir Henry Hoghton, countersigned by General Charles Wills, which requested him to "raise all the force you can, and bring arms fit for service—scythes in straight poles—spades and bill hooks and draw them to Cuerden Green about two miles from Preston." As a result of this, Wood assembled a force of Chowbent men and led them to Cuerden Green where, in the Battle of Preston, they were given the job of guarding the bridge over the River Ribble at Walton-le-Dale and the ford at Penwortham, which were both successfully defended. Estimates for the size of Wood's contingent vary from 80, which is most likely, to 400 men. After the Highlanders were routed and for his efforts Wood was given a £100 pension by parliament and the title "the General" by his Chowbent congregation.

== Chowbent Chapel ==
Wood's congregation grew to about 1,000 members, the third largest in Lancashire. It occupied Atherton Chapel, the old Bent Chapel, a small brick building with three windows and a porch. Its windows had curved arches with diamond panes of glass in leaded frames. Inside was a three-tier pulpit.

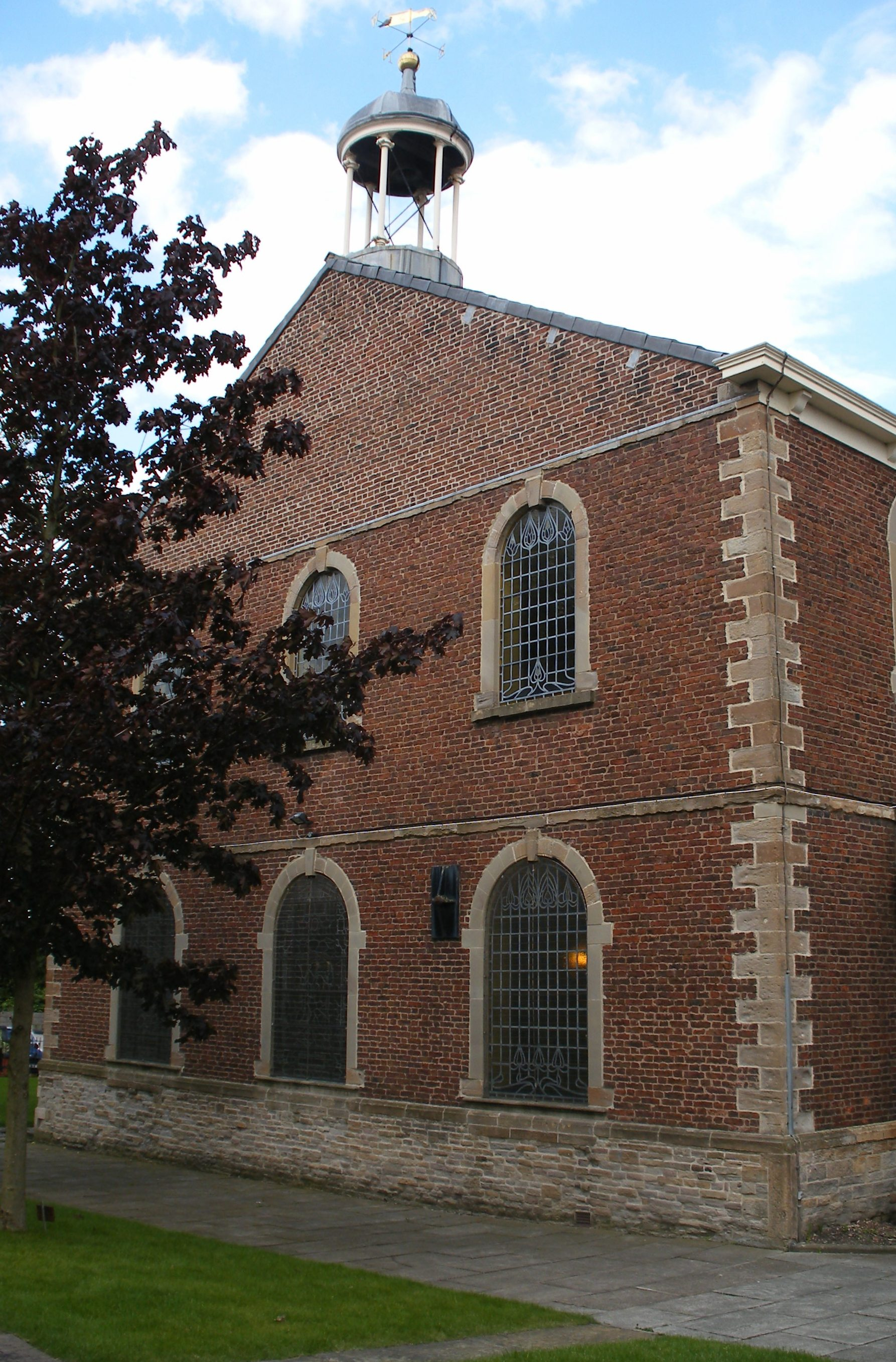
Chowbent Chapel is a plain building made of rustic brick with stone details, round arched windows and a small cupola on its gable end.

The chapel was built in 1645 on land owned by lord of the manor, John Atherton. In 1721 his successor Richard Atherton, a supporter of the Jacobite cause, expelled James Wood and the congregation from the chapel for their part in the battle. The dissenters left quietly and met in local barns and houses, including the minister's home at Gib Fold, until they had built Chowbent Chapel, completed in 1722 on land donated by Nathan Mort at Alderfold. Wood was instrumental in raising money for the chapel and used his pension towards the cost.
