= Joshua Bayes =

British minister

Joshua Bayes (1671–1746) was an English nonconformist minister.

== Life ==
Bayes was the son of Joshua Bayes, whose brother was Rev. Samuel Bayes. Samuel was ejected by the Act of Uniformity of 1662 from a living in Derbyshire, afterwards residing in Manchester until his death. It is believed that Joshua was born in 1671. He received his entire secular education in the grammar school of his native town, Manchester. Being dedicated from his birth to the nonconformist ministry, he was placed under the tuition of Richard Frankland, of Attercliffe in Yorkshire, on 15 Nov. 1686.

On the conclusion of his course he proceeded to London, and was admitted for "examination" by a number of the elder ministers "according to the practice of the times". He was ordained preacher of the gospel and minister on 22 June 1694. This - the first public ordination amongst dissenters in the city after the Act of Uniformity - took place in the meeting-house of Samuel Annesley in Little St. Helens. There were six candidates, one of whom was Edmund Calamy.

It appears that young Bayes served the churches around London as a kind of itinerant or evangelist for some years. But about 1706 he settled at St. Thomas's meeting-house, Southwark, as assistant to John Sheffield, one of the most original of the later puritan writers. This engagement requiring his attendance only in the morning of each Sunday, he also acted as assistant to Christopher Taylor at Leather Lane.

When Matthew Henry died, leaving his Commentary unfinished, its completion was entrusted to a select number of Presbyterian divines, including Bayes, to whom was assigned the Epistle to the Galatians. The continuation has never secured the unique acceptance of Matthew Henry's own writing, but the "Galatians" is among the best of the supplements.

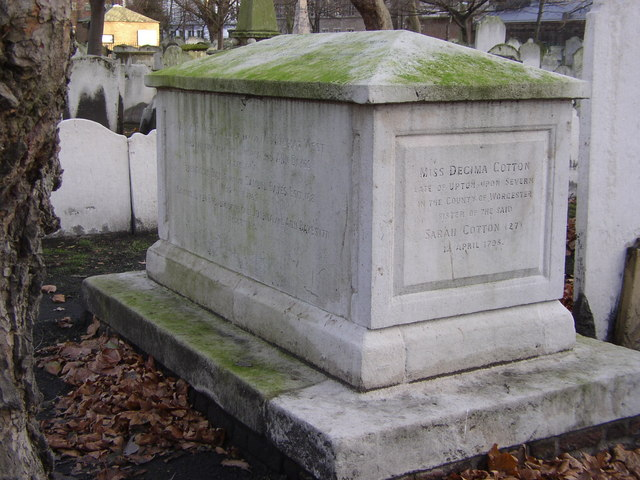
Monument to members of the Bayes and Cotton families, including Joshua Bayes and his son Thomas, in Bunhill Fields burial ground

With Taylor of Leather Lane dying in 1723, Bayes, his assistant, was invited to succeed him. Accordingly, he resigned the morning service at St. Thomas's. Subsequently, he himself appointed ‘assistants’, first John Cornish, and next his own son, Thomas Bayes. Dr. Calamy's death in 1732 caused a vacancy in the Merchants' lectureship at Salters' Hall, and Bayes was chosen to succeed him.

In 1735 he associated himself with a number of divines in a course of lectures - also delivered at Salters' Hall - against popery. His own subject was "The Church of Rome's Doctrine and Practice with relation to the Worship of God in an unknown tongue", which was later published.

He died on 24 April 1746, and was buried in Bunhill Fields.

== Family ==
In October 1700, Bayes married Ann Carpenter; they had seven children.

Their eldest child Thomas Bayes was a minister and statistician who formulated the Bayes' theorem.

His youngest daughter Rebecca married Thomas Cotton, son of the Reverend Thomas Cotton.

== Works ==
Besides the publications already named, he published several occasional sermons. There is a portrait of him (in oil) in Dr Williams's library, engraved in Wilson's History and Antiquities of Dissenting Churches.

He also worked with Samuel Price (1676–1756) on the editing of a book by Thomas Doolittle which was published in 1723.
