= Obadiah Hughes =

English Presbyterian minister

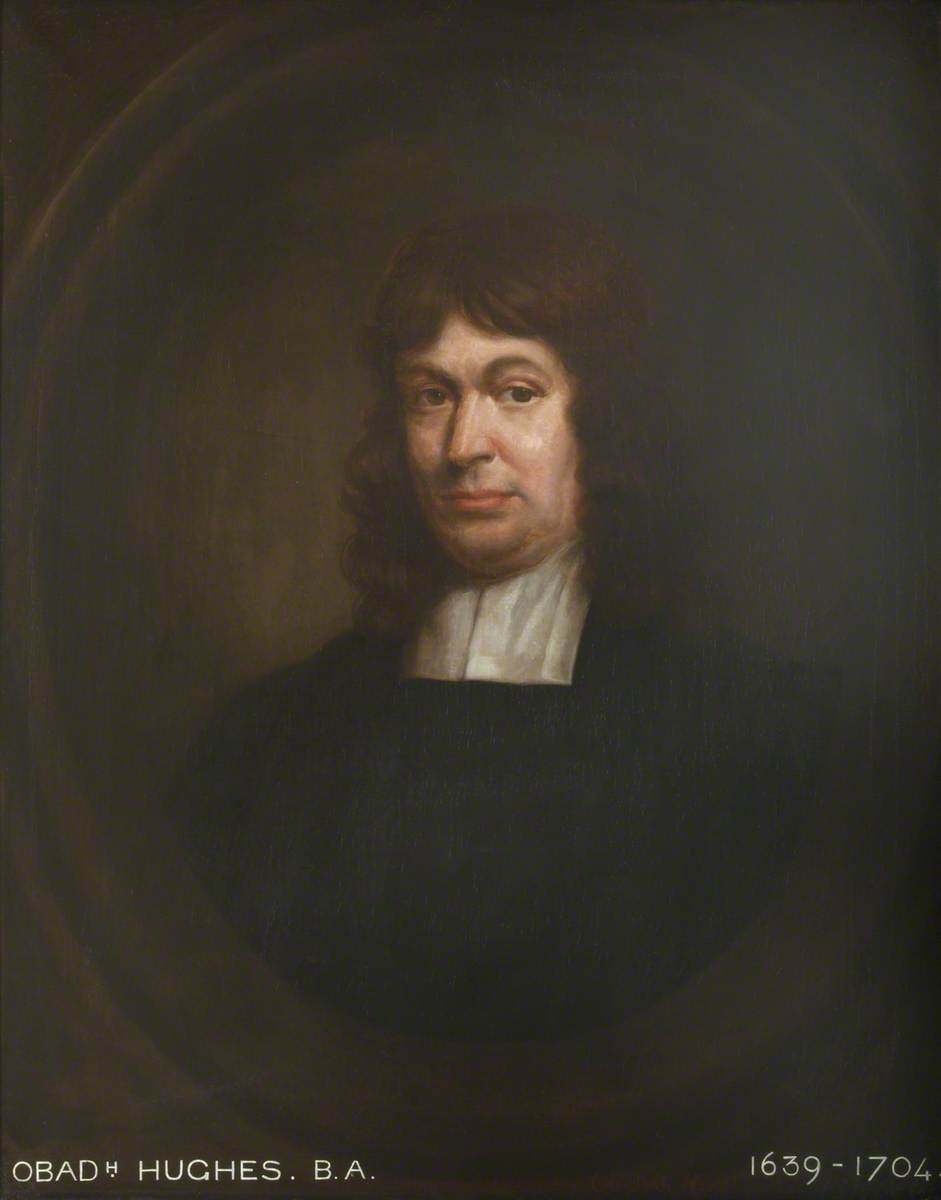
Obadiah Hughes

Obadiah Hughes (1695–1751) was an English Presbyterian minister.

== Life ==
=== Education ===
He was the son of George Hughes (died in November 1719), minister at Canterbury, and was born in 1695. His father was grandson of George Hughes, and son of Obadiah Hughes (died 24 January 1704, aged 64), who was ejected in 1662 from a studentship at Christ Church, Oxford, before taking his degree, received presbyterian ordination on 9 March 1670 at Plymouth, and ministered from April 1674 in London, and afterwards at Enfield.

Obadiah Hughes the younger was educated by his father, by the dissenting tutor John Jennings at Kibworth, and then at Aberdeen. In 1728 Kings College, Aberdeen, sent him the diploma of D.D. Having acted for some time as a domestic chaplain, he was ordained on 11 January 1721 at the Old Jewry, being then assistant to Joshua Oldfield, at Maid Lane, Southwark.

=== Career ===
Though a non-subscriber at Salters' Hall in 1719, Hughes was an evangelical preacher. With Nathaniel Lardner and others he established a Tuesday evening lecture at the Old Jewry; he belonged also, with Jeremiah Hunt and others, to a ministers' club which met at Chew's Coffee-house, Bow Lane. On Oldfield's death on 8 November 1729 he became sole pastor at Maid Lane, and was at once elected Oldfield's successor as trustee of Dr. Williams's Foundations. He took part in 1734 in the course of sermons against popery at Salters' Hall. From 1738 to 1750 he was secretary to the presbyterian board. In 1743 he succeeded Samuel Say at Long Ditch (now Princes Street), Westminster. He became one of the Salters' Hall lecturers in 1746.

Hughes's health failed him while he was still in his prime, and he died on 10 December 1751. Funeral sermons were preached by Samuel Lawrence of Monkwell Street, and John Allen of New Broad Street; that by the latter was published.

== Family ==
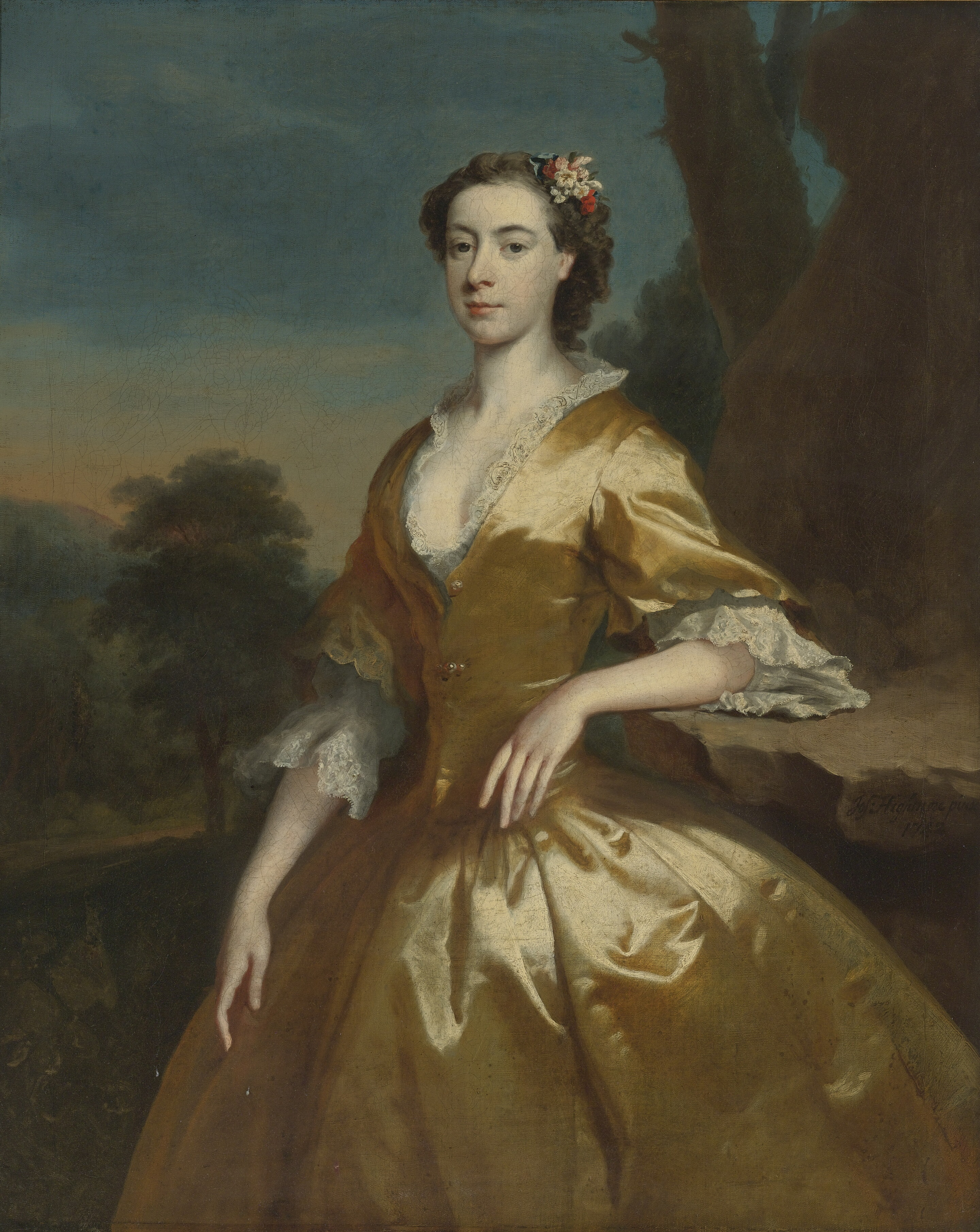
Delicia Fryer, Mrs. Joshua Iremonger, painting by Joseph Highmore, 1742.

Hughes married a sister of Sir John Fryer, 1st Baronet, one of the presbyterian gentry, who was Lord Mayor of London in 1721. He adopted his wife's niece, Delicia Fryer, who married Joshua Iremonger and died in December 1744.

== Bibliography ==
Walter Wilson gives a list of fourteen separate sermons by Hughes published between 1726 and 1749, eight of them being funeral sermons, including those for Oldfield and Say. Others were:

- A Sermon on the Anniversary of King George's Coronation, 1725
- The Salvation of God's People, 1745
- Peace attended with Reformation, 1749.

A nephew, Obadiah Hughes, son of John Hughes, minister at Ware, Hertfordshire (died 1729, brother of the foregoing), was a fellow-student with Doddridge at Kibworth, assisted his father at Ware, and was then minister at Staplehurst, Kent.
