= Edmund Calamy IV =

English dissenting minister

Edmund Calamy IV (c. 1697 in London – 1755) was an English dissenting minister, the eldest son of the historian Edmund Calamy (1671–1732) by his first wife, Mary Watts. He was known as "a gentleman remarkable for his humanity, and ever employed in works of beneficence and charity."

== Career ==
After passing through Westminster School, Calamy, with Oxford and Cambridge being closed to Dissenters, entered the Edinburgh University in 1714. He graduated M.A. on 15 June 1717, eight years after the University had awarded its first-ever DD to his father. From Edinburgh he went to Leiden University, where he entered 29 September 1717. For some time he assisted his father at Westminster, but in 1726 he was chosen to succeed Clark Oldisworth, as assistant to the pastor of the presbyterian congregation in Crosby Square, Benjamin Grosvenor. He was a member of the presbyterian board (1739–48), and a trustee of Dr. Williams's Foundations from 1740 till his death. In 1749 Grosvenor resigned his charge, owing to advancing years, and simultaneously Calamy retired from the ministry. He died on 13 June 1755, and was buried on 17 June in the chancel of St Mary Aldermanbury. Three years later his library was sold at the Exeter Exchange.

== Family ==
His son Edmund (b. 18 May 1743 - d. 12 May 1816), who entered Warrington Academy in 1761 as a divinity student, removed to Cambridge in 1763, and became a barrister of Lincoln's Inn. He was a member of the presbyterian board, and a Williams' trustee (1784–1812). Thomas Emlyn of London, barrister (grandson of Thomas Emlyn, whose unitarian views E. Calamy, D.D., had controverted), by will dated 20 July 1796 left lands at Syddan, County Meath, to ‘Edmond Calamy, Esq., senior.’ In 1812 the barrister left London and died four years later at Alphington, near Exeter, aged seventy-three.

== Notes ==
Attribution

This article incorporates text from a publication now in the public domain: "Calamy, Edmund (1697?-1755)". Dictionary of National Biography. London: Smith, Elder & Co. 1885–1900.
