= Thomas Napier Thomson =

Scottish minister, historian and biographer

Personal details
- Born: Thomas Napier Thomson; 25 February 1798; Glasgow, Scotland
- Died: 1 February 1869 (aged 70); Trinity, Edinburgh

Thomas Napier Thomson (25 February 1798 – 1 February 1869) was a Scottish minister, historian and biographer. While still young he stopped using his middle name.

== Life ==
He was born in Glasgow on 25 February 1798, the fifth son of Hugh Thomson, a West India merchant. About 1812 the family moved to London, and Thomson was placed at a boarding-school near Barnet. A bronchial medical problem meant he was sent to his uncle's house in Ayrshire, and in October 1813 he entered the University of Glasgow as "Thomas Thomson", dropping the middle name after a disagreement with the Napier family.

After entering the divinity hall as a student for the ministry, Thomson was reduced to poverty by his father's money troubles. He supported himself at college as a private tutor, and in 1823 obtained the two highest prizes in the University of Glasgow. Having received a license as a preacher, he officiated in many parts of Scotland, as well as in Newcastle and Birmingham. In Glasgow he delivered a series of lectures to ladies on the "Philosophy of History".

In 1827 he was appointed assistant to Laurence Adamson, minister of Cupar-Fife; but had to resign when his throat problem flared up. He was then ordained to the charge of the Scottish church in Maitland, New South Wales, for which he sailed on 11 May 1831 with a brother and sister. On arriving at Maitland, there was neither church, manse, nor congregation, so he initiated a charge at Bathurst on 13 July 1832. About this time he married. Shortly after the birth of his second child he resigned his charge and returned to England.

Thomson arrived in England 1835, becoming a professional writer. In July 1844 he left London for Edinburgh, where he had been appointed by the Scottish Free Church editor of a series of works it was about to publish. When that ended, he worked on journalism. In 1851 he became connected with Blackie & Son, the publishers, for whom he later was a staff writer.

Thomson died at Trinity, Edinburgh, on 1 February 1869.

== Works ==
In 1818 Thomson published The Immortality of the Soul, and other Poems, his only work in verse. In his college days he produced also Richard Gordon, The Christian Martyr, A Visit to Dalgarnock, and The City of the Sun. As a minister, he wrote for The Christian Instructor.

Charles Knight took Thomson on to edit and remodel Robert Henry's ‘History of Great Britain.’ This project was shelved in favour of a new work, The Pictorial History of England (1838), to which Thomson was one of the main contributors. He also wrote extensively for the periodical press, and biographical and critical notices for The Book of the Poets: Chaucer to Beattie (London, 1842).

In 1840 Thomson was commissioned by the Wodrow Society to edit David Calderwood's Historie of the Kirk of Scotland. He used the original manuscript in the British Museum, and took nearly five years. The Free Church series of which Thomson was editor comprised the Select Practical Writings of John Knox and others.

In 1851 Thomson wrote a supplementary volume of Robert Chambers's Biographical Dictionary of Eminent Scotsmen, and immediately before his death he prepared a new edition (3 vols., revised and continued with a supplement) which was published between 1869 and 1871. It is his best known work. His own biography is contained in the supplement. He also published:

- British Naval Biography: Howard to Codrington, London, 1839; 2nd edit. 1854.
- British Military Biography: Alfred to Wellington, London, 1840; 2nd edit. 1854.
- History of Scotland for Schools, Edinburgh, 1849.

Thomson edited:

- Robert Fleming the younger's Discourse on the Rise and Fall of the Papacy, Edinburgh, 1846;
- John Milton's Poetical Works, London, 1853;
- the works of James Hogg, 2 vols., Edinburgh, 1865;
- Civil and Military History of England, a work of Charles Macfarlane from the Pictorial History, as The Comprehensive History of England (4 vols. 1858–61).

== Notes ==
Attribution

This article incorporates text from a publication now in the public domain: Lee, Sidney, ed. (1898). "Thomson, Thomas Napier". Dictionary of National Biography. Vol. 56. London: Smith, Elder & Co.
