= Robert Fleming the younger =

Scottish presbyterian minister and writer

Rev Robert Fleming (the younger) (1660–1716) was a Scottish presbyterian minister, of liberal views, known as an early supporter of the principle of non-subscription to the Westminster Confession, and as an apocalyptic writer.

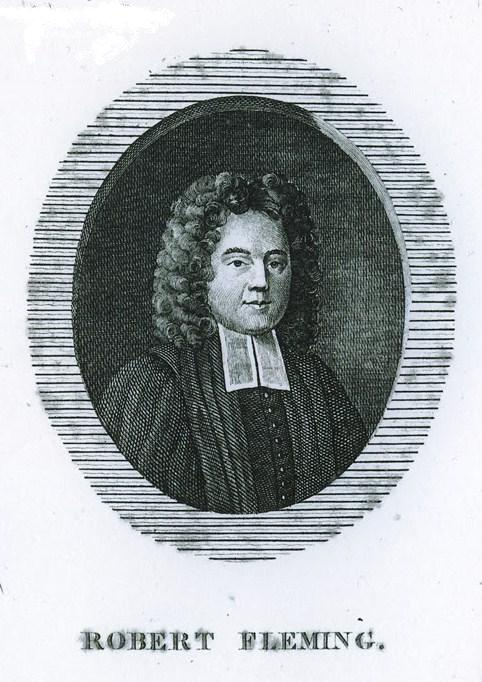
Robert Fleming

== Life ==
The son of Rev Robert Fleming, he was born in the manse at Cambuslang in Lanarkshire in 1660. His early education was at the school of his uncle Rev John Sinclair, minister of Ormiston, Haddingtonshire. In 1679 his father took him to Holland, where he studied at the universities of Leyden and Utrecht. On 9 February 1688 he was privately ordained by Scottish ministers in Holland, without special charge.

Fleming moved to England, and was domestic chaplain in a private family for about four years. In 1692 he accepted a call to the pastorate of the English presbyterian congregation at Leyden. On his father's death he was invited to succeed him in the Scots Church at Rotterdam, to which he was inducted in 1695.

In 1698 Fleming received a call to the Scots Church, Founders' Hall, Lothbury, supported by William Carstares and William III, who had known him in Holland. Fleming began his ministry there on 19 June 1698. The meeting-house was rebuilt for him about 1700. His position was influential: William III consulted him on the ecclesiastical affairs of Scotland, and he had good relations with Archbishop Thomas Tenison. Through the influence of a kinsman, John, Lord Carmichael, secretary of state for Scotland, he had the offer of the principalship of Glasgow University, but he declined.

On 15 May 1701 Fleming succeeded Vincent Alsop as one of the Tuesday lecturers at Salters' Hall, a lectureship which represented the liberal side in the Calvinistic controversy. On 7 May 1707 he was the spokesman of the London ministers of the "three denominations" in presenting an address of congratulation to Queen Anne on the union with Scotland.

A serious illness laid Fleming aside for a time. On his recovery he paid a visit to Holland, where he took part in political negotiations in the Protestant interest. He returned, shortly before the accession of George I of Great Britain. He died on 21 May 1716. Joshua Oldfield preached his funeral sermon. He left a widow and several children.

== Works ==
His Christology (1705–8) shows that while Fleming himself orthodox on the person of Christ, he was opposed to any form of subscription. He held the tenet of the pre-existence of Christ's human soul.

To the speculations in his Apocalyptical Key (1701) Fleming chiefly owes his posthumous fame. In 1793, and again in 1848, attention was directed to the apparent historical verification of some of his conjectures. He predicted the fall of the French monarchy by 1794 at latest, and fixed on a period around 1848 as the date at which the papacy would receive an ultimately fatal blow. Fleming follows Joseph Mede, but set the beginning of Antichrist at 768 AD.

Fleming published:

- The Mirror of Divine Love … a poetical Paraphrase on the .., Song of Solomon … other Poems, &c., 1691. It included the dramatic poem Monarchical Image, or Nebuchadnezzar's Dream.
- An Epistolary Discourse … with a Second Part, &c., 1692.
- A Discourse on Earthquakes, &c., 1693; reprinted 1793.
- The Rod and the Sword, &c., 1694; reprinted 1701 and 1793.
- Apocalyptical Key. An extraordinary Discourse on the Rise and Fall of Papacy, &c., 1701 (dedicated to Lord Carmichael); reprinted 1793, and Edinburgh 1849, with memoir by Thomas Napier Thomson.
- Discourses on Several Subjects, 1701.
- A Brief Account of Religion, &c., 1701.
- Christology, &c., vol. i. 1705 (dedicated to Queen Anne); vols. ii. and iii., 1708; an abridgment was published in one vol., Edinburgh 1795.
- The History of Hereditary Right,(anon).

Also eight sermons at funerals and special occasions between 1688 and 1716.
