= John Howe (theologian) =

English Puritan theologian

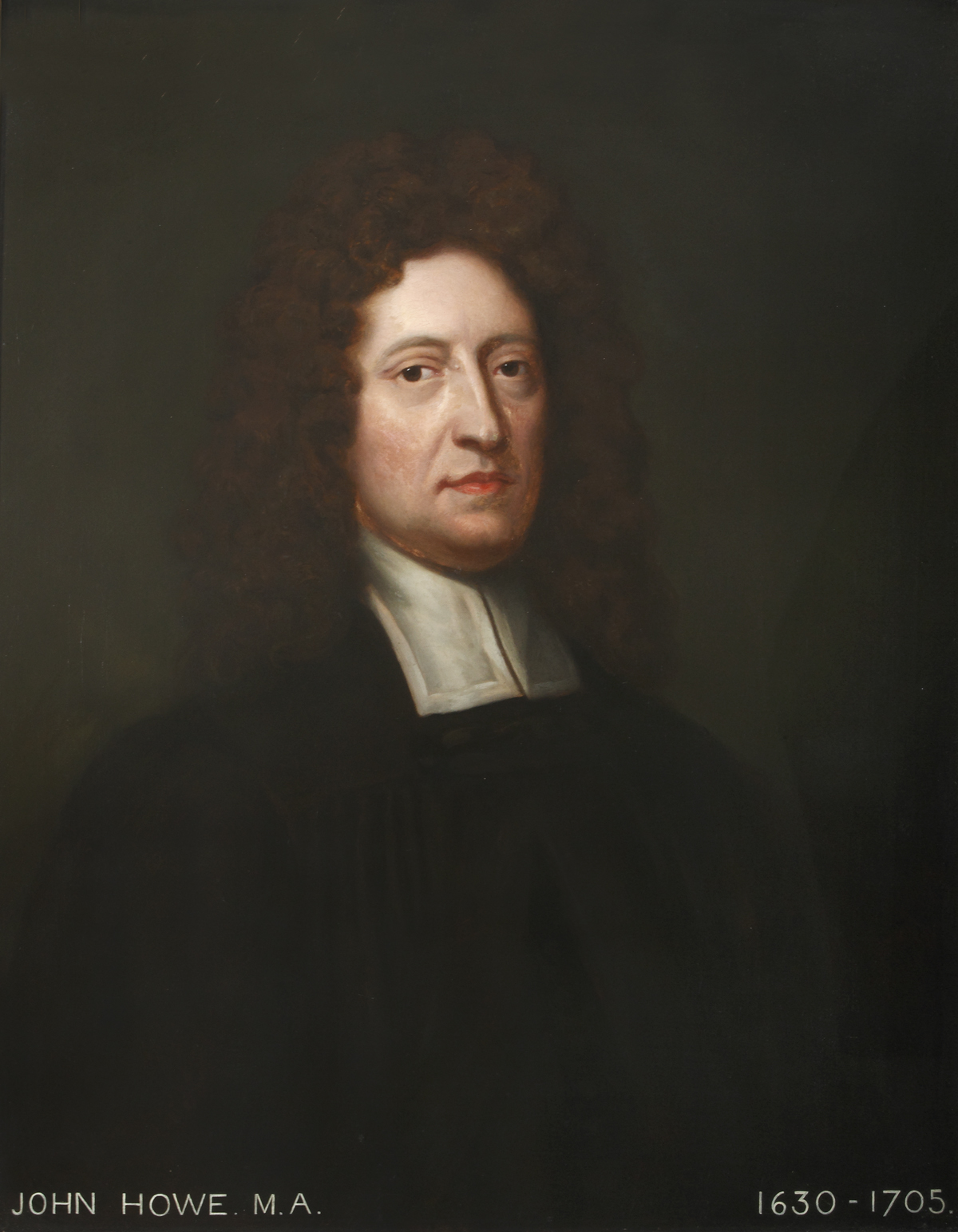
John Howe

John Howe (17 May 1630 – 2 April 1705) was an English Puritan theologian. He served briefly as chaplain to Oliver Cromwell.

== Life ==
Howe was born at Loughborough. At the age of five he went to Ireland with his father, a Non-Confirmist preacher who had been ejected from his living by William Laud. The family returned to England in 1641 and settled with his father in Lancaster. He studied at Christ's College, Cambridge, and at Magdalen College, Oxford (B.A., 1650; M.A., 1652), where for a time he was fellow and college chaplain. At Cambridge he came under the influence of Ralph Cudworth and Henry More, from whom he probably received the Platonic tinge that marks his writings.

About 1654 he was appointed to the perpetual curacy of Great Torrington, Devon. In this place, according to his own statement, he was engaged in the pulpit on fast days from nine to four, with a recess of fifteen minutes, during which the people sang. While on a visit to London in 1656 Oliver Cromwell prevailed upon him to preach at Whitehall, with the result that Howe, much against his preferences, became one of Cromwell's chaplains. Upon Richard Cromwell's retirement he returned to his former parish at Torrington. When the Act of Uniformity 1662 was passed he quit his church, but remained for some time in the neighbourhood, preaching in private houses. In this period he was cited before the Bishop of Exeter, his old friend Seth Ward, who vainly urged Howe to be reordained.

In 1666 Howe accepted the Five Mile Act, but with the limiting clause, "so far as the laws of man are agreeable to the Word of God." In 1671 he became chaplain to Lord Massereene, of Antrim Castle, Ireland. Here he was a member of the Antrim Meeting, the precursor of the Presbyterian organization in Ireland. In 1676 he returned to London as the successor of Lazarus Seaman at Haberdashers' Hall. In 1685, on account of the greater severity shown to the dissenters, he accepted an invitation to accompany Lord Wharton to the Continent, and the year following settled at Utrecht. When James II issued his declaration for liberty of conscience in 1687 Howe returned to his old position in London. From this time till his death he took an active interest in current discussions on predestination, the Trinity, and conformity. In 1688 he headed a deputation of dissenting ministers in an address of welcome to William of Orange. The following year, he published an anonymous pamphlet entitled The Case of the Protestant Dissenters represented and argued.

He died in London.

== Principal writings ==
- The Blessedness of the Righteous (London, 1668)
- Delighting in God (1674), (L. B. Seeley & Son, 1825)
- The Living Temple (2 parts, 1675–1702), his best-known book
- The Redeemer's Tears Wept over Lost Souls (1684)
- Works issued with a Life by Edmund Calamy (2 vols., 1724), and edited by J. Hunt (8 vols., 1810–22). There is also an American edition (2 vols., New York, 1869).

== Bibliography ==
- H. Rogers, Life and Character of John Howe, London, reprinted 1879;
