= Matthew Sylvester =

English nonconformist cleric (d. 1708)

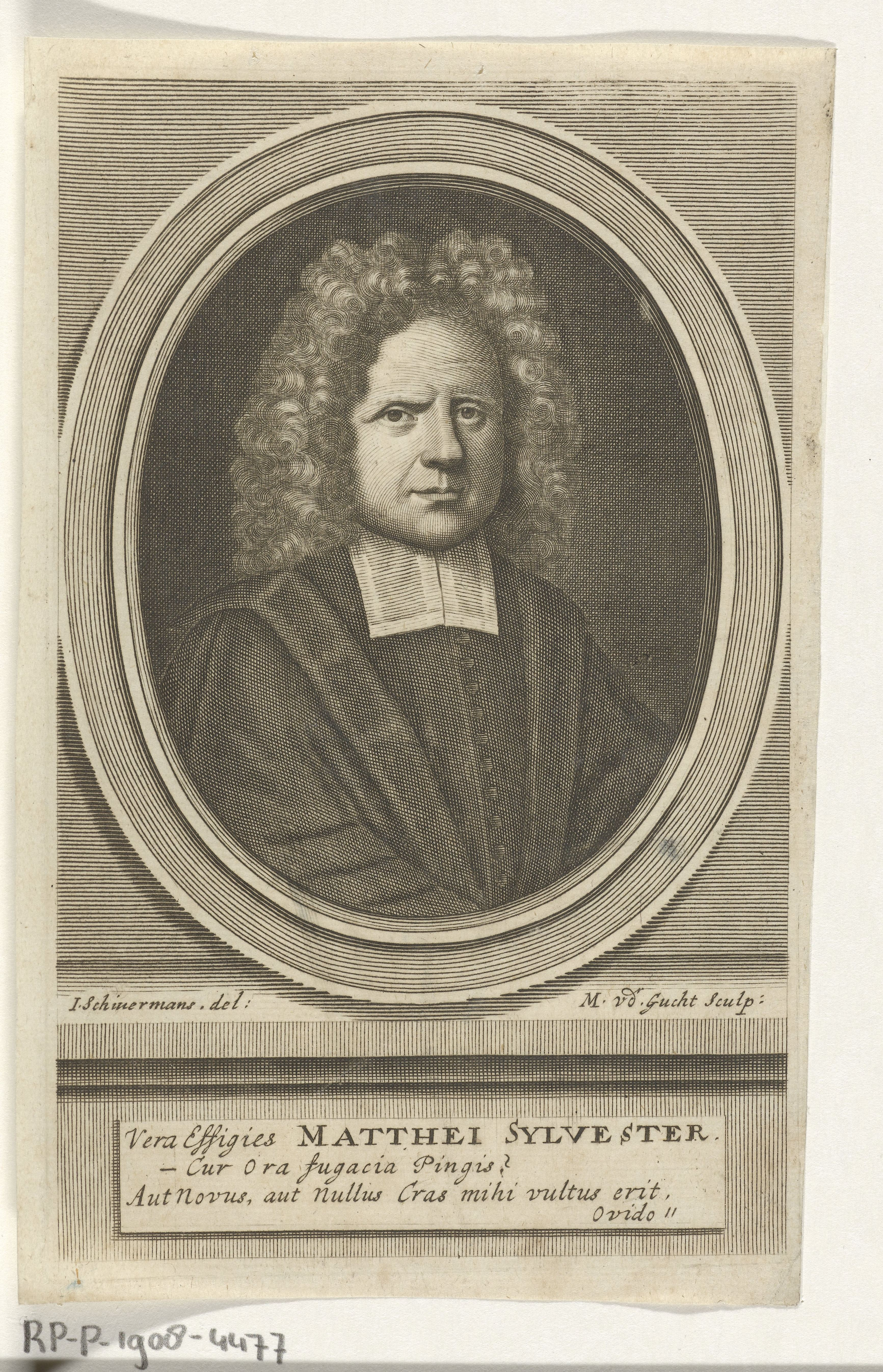
Matthew Sylvester

Matthew Sylvester (Southwell, c. 1636– London, 1708) was an English nonconformist cleric.

== Youth ==
Matthew Sylvester, son of Robert Sylvester, mercer, and his wife Mary Lee, was born at Southwell, Nottinghamshire, about 1636. From Southwell grammar school, on 4 May 1654, at the age of seventeen, he was admitted at St. John's College, Cambridge. He was too poor to stay long at college, but as he kept up his studies while supporting himself in various places, probably by teaching, he became a good linguist and well read in philosophy.

== Career ==
About 1659, Sylvester obtained the vicarage of Great Gonerby, Lincolnshire. He was a distant relative of Robert Sanderson, who became bishop of Lincoln in 1660. In consequence of the Act of Uniformity of 1662, he resigned his living in that year, rejecting Sanderson's offer of further preferment. He then became domestic chaplain to Sir John Bright, 1st Baronet, and subsequently to John White, a Nottinghamshire Presbyterian.

In 1667 he was living at Mansfield with Joseph Truman, but in that year he came to London, and became pastor of a congregation at Rutland House, Charterhouse Yard. He was on good terms with many of the London clergy, particularly Benjamin Whichcote and John Tillotson. Richard Baxter, who remained to the last in communion with the Church of England, and declined to be pastor of any separated congregation, nevertheless became, from 1687, Sylvester's unpaid assistant. He valued Sylvester for his meekness, temper, sound principles, and great pastoral ability. Baxter's eloquence as a preacher supplied what was lacking to Sylvester, whose delivery was poor, though in prayer he had a remarkable gift, as Oliver Heywood notes. After Baxter's death in 1691 the congregation declined. Early in 1692 it was removed to a building in Meeting House Court, Knightrider Street. Edmund Calamy, who was Sylvester's assistant from 1692 to 1695, describes him as ‘a very meek spirited, silent, and inactive man,’ in straitened circumstances.

After Calamy left him Sylvester plodded on by himself till his death. He died suddenly on Sunday evening, 25 January 1708. Calamy preached his funeral sermon on 1 February.

== Works ==
He published four sermons in the Morning Exercises (1676–90); three single sermons (1697–1707), including funeral sermons for Grace Cox and Sarah Petit, and The Christian's Race … described [in sermons], 1702–8, in 2 volumes (the second edited by J. Bates). He wrote prefaces to works by Baxter, Manton, Manlove, and others. His chief claim to remembrance is as the literary executor of Baxter.

He also wrote Primitive Baptism and Therein Infant’s and Parent’s Rights.

In 1696 he issued the long-expected folio, Reliquiæ Baxterianæ. Or, Richard Baxter's Narrative of the most Memorable Passages of his Life and Times; appended is Sylvester's funeral sermon for Baxter. According to the Dictionary of National Biography, no book of its importance was ever worse edited. Sylvester, an unmethodical man, had to deal with ‘a great quantity of loose papers,’ needing to be sorted. He transcribed most of the work himself. He noted that it took his ‘weak hand’ above an hour to write ‘an octavo page’ (Preface, § 1). During the progress of the work he was, according to Calamy, ‘chary of it in the last degree,’ and with great difficulty brought to consent to the few excisions which Calamy deemed necessary. In addition to a fatal lack of arrangement, the folio abounds in misprints, as Sylvester ‘could not attend the press and prevent the errata.’ The ‘contents’ and index are by Calamy, who subsequently issued an octavo Abridgment (1702, 1714), much handier but very inferior in interest to the Reliquiæ.
