= Richard Frankland (tutor) =

English nonconformist (1630–1698)

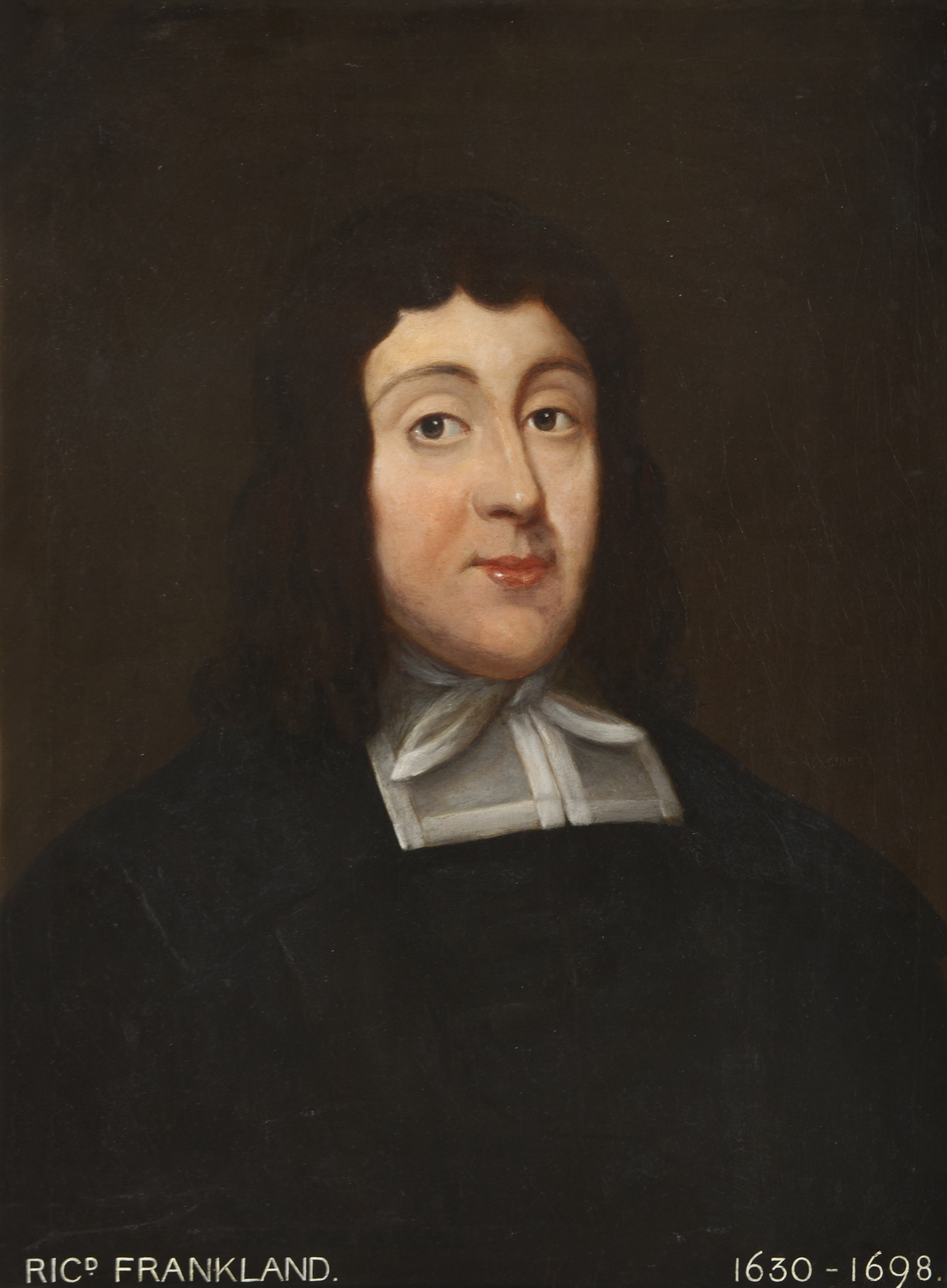
Richard Frankland

Richard Frankland (1630–1698) was an English nonconformist, notable for founding the Rathmell Academy, a dissenting academy in the north of England.

== Biography ==
Richard Frankland, son of John Frankland, was born on 1 November 1630, at Rathmell, a hamlet in the parish of Giggleswick, Yorkshire. The Franklands of Thirkleby, Yorkshire (baronets from 1660), with whom John Frankland was connected, were originally from Giggleswick. Frankland was educated (1640–1648) at Giggleswick grammar school, and was admitted on 18 May 1648 as minor pensionary at Christ's College, Cambridge. The tone of his college, under the mastership of Samuel Bolton, D.D., was that of a cultured puritanism. Frankland, like Oliver Heywood, received lasting impressions from the preaching of Samuel Hammond, lecturer (till 1652) at St. Giles'. He was a hard student, and took his degrees with distinction (B.A. 1651, M.A. 1655).

=== Northumberland and Durham ===
After graduating, Frankland preached for short periods at Hexham, Northumberland; Houghton-le-Spring, Durham; and Lanchester, Durham. At Lanchester he received presbyterian ordination on 14 September 1653. 'Discouragements' led him to remove to a chaplaincy at Ellenthorp Hall, near Boroughbridge, West Yorkshire, in the family of John Brook (d 1693), twice lord mayor of York, and a strong presbyterian. Frankland left Ellenthorp to become curate to Lupthern, rector of Sedgefield, Durham. Sir Arthur Haslerig put him into the rich vicarage of Bishop Auckland, Durham, some time before August 1659. Some post was designed for him in Durham College, for which Cromwell had issued a patent on 15 May 1657. His patron, Haslerig, was interested in the success of this college, which died at the Restoration.

At Bishop Auckland, where two of his children were born, Frankland confined himself to his parochial duties. After the Restoration he was one of the first to be attacked for nonconformity. His living was in the bishop's gift, but John Cosin (consecrated 2 December 1660) did not interfere with a peaceable man. An attorney named Bowster demanded of him, 'publickly before the congregation,' whether he intended to conform. Frankland thought it would be time to answer this question when the terms of conformity had been settled; and meanwhile relied on the king's declaration (25 October 1660) dispensing with conformity. Bowster, with a neighbouring clergyman, got possession of the keys and locked Frankland out of his church. He indicted them for riot, but the case was dismissed at the assizes for a technical flaw in the indictment. Cosin now offered to institute Frankland and give him higher preferment if he would receive episcopal ordination. He even proposed, but without result, to ordain him conditionally, and 'so privately that the people might not know of it.' By the Corporation Act 1661 Frankland was confirmed in the possession of his living; but the Act of Uniformity 1662 of the following year ejected him.

=== Rathmell ===
In 1662 Frankland retired to his patrimony at Rathmell, where he lived some years in privacy. His children were baptised (1664 and 1668) at the parish church. At this period he did not join the ranks of the 'conventicle' preachers. Efforts were being made by the nonconformists of the north to secure the educational advantages offered for a short time by the Durham College. William Pell, who had been a fellow of Magdalene College, Cambridge, and a tutor at Durham, declined to start an academical institution, holding himself precluded by his graduation oath from resuming collegiate lectures outside the ancient universities. Application was then successfully made to Frankland, who was not hindered by the same scruple. Nonconformist tutors usually understood the oath as referring to prelections in order to a degree. Before opening his 'academy' Frankland was in London, where he felt 'a violent impulse upon his mind to go to the king.' By the help of 'the old Earl of Manchester, lord chamberleyne' (Edward Montagu), he gained an audience while Charles was on his way to the council. Frankland, in the divine name, enjoined Charles 'to reform your life, your family, your kingdom, and the church,' adding an impressive warning. '"I will," saith the king, "do what I can."' After a few more words 'the king hasted away, saying, "I thank you, sir," and twice looking back before he went into the counsel-chamber, said, "I thank you, sir; I thank you"'.

=== Frankland's academy ===
Early in March 1670 Frankland began to receive students at Rathmell. His first student was George, youngest son of Sir Thomas Liddell, bart., of Ravensworth Castle, Durham, head of a family distinguished for its loyalty, though marked by puritan leanings. Some of his students were intended for the legal, others for the medical profession; his first divinity students belonged to the independent denomination. It was not till the indulgence of 1672, from which Stillingfleet dates the presbyterian separation, that divinity students connected with that body were sent to Rathmell, and the earliest nonconformist 'academy' (as distinct from a mere school) became an important institution and the model of others. The course of studies in this 'northern academy' included 'logic, metaphysics, somatology, pneumatology, natural philosophy, divinity, and chronology.' The lectures were in Latin, and given by Frankland until he had trained up assistants, among whom were John Issot, Richard Frankland (the tutor's son) and John Owen. The discipline of the house was strict, but Frankland always succeeded in gaining the confidence of his students, and maintained his authority with 'admirable temper.' Morning prayers were at seven, winter and summer; lectures were over by noon, but solitary study went on after dinner till six o'clock prayers, and supper was followed by discussion of the day's work, unhampered by the tutor's presence. Those who wished to graduate went on to Scotland, where they were promoted to a degree after one session's attendance. The total number of Frankland's students was 304; among the best known of his divinity students are William Tong (entered 2 March 1681), Joshua Bayes and John Evans, D.D. (entered 26 May 1697), leaders of the Presbyterian interest in London. John Disney (1677–1730) entered as a law student on 5 July 1695. The ministry of dissent in the north of England was chiefly recruited from Frankland's academy, as the ejected of 1662 gradually died out. James Wood minister of Chowbent Chapel was a student of the academy.

=== Migrations ===
The academy had six migrations from place to place. In consequence of the indulgence, Frankland had begun to preach at Rathmell, and though 'no very taking' preacher, his solid discourses gained him a call from a congregation in Westmoreland. At Natland, near Kendal, the dissenters of the neighbourhood held their worship, the parochial chapel being in ruins. Frankland moved hither with his academy in 1674 (between 20 February and 26 May). The congregation increased under his care, and he extended his labours to Kendal and elsewhere. The first nonconformist ordination in Yorkshire was held (10 July 1678) at his instigation and with his assistance. He met with considerable opposition, but the first definite reference to proceedings against him occurs in a manuscript notebook of Oliver Heywood, under date 29 May 1681. Frankland had been excommunicated in the ecclesiastical court; his friends had obtained an absolution for him, upon which the official gave notice 'that Mr. Richard Frankland, the ringleader of the sectarys, hath voluntarily submitted himself to the orders of the church and is reconciled to it'. The report ran that Frankland had conformed and got a good living. Early in 1683 the enforcement of the Five Miles Act compelled him to leave Natland as being too near to Kendal. He transferred his academy to Calton Hall, the seat of the Lamberts, in the parish of Kirkby Malham, West Yorkshire, and in 1684 to Dawson Fold in Westmoreland, just outside the five-miles radius from Kendal. In 1685 (a year in which two of his former students were imprisoned at York, and the only year in which his academy received no accessions) he retired to Hart Barrow, near to Cartmel Fell, just inside the Lancashire border, and so convenient for escaping a writ for either county. Late in 1686 Frankland availed himself of James II's arbitrary exercise of the dispensing power, took out a fifty shilling dispensation, and removed to Attercliffe, a suburb of Sheffield, Yorkshire. He left Attercliffe at the end of July 1689, in consequence of the death of his favourite son, and returned to Rathmell. His pupil Timothy Jollie, independent minister at Sheffield, began another academy at Attercliffe on a more restricted principle than Frankland's, excluding mathematics 'as tending to scepticism.'

=== Troubles ===
Frankland carried his academy with him back to Rathmell, and during the remaining nine years of his life he admitted nearly as many students as in the whole previous period of over nineteen years. His congregation also throve, and he maintained harmony among its members at a time when many were beginning to relax their hold of the Calvinism to which he himself adhered. But while the Toleration Act protected him as a preacher, hardly a year passed without some fresh attempt on the part of the authorities to put down his academy. For not answering a citation to the archbishop's (Lamplugh) court he was again excommunicated; at the instance of Lord Wharton and Sir Thomas Rokeby, William III ordered his absolution, which was read in Giggleswick Church. Soon after the consecration of Sharp as archbishop of York (5 July 1691) new alarm was excited by the assembling of twenty-four nonconformist ministers at Wakefield (2 September) to consider the 'heads of agreement' sent down from London as an irenicon (a proposition or device for securing peace) between the presbyterian and independent sections. Frankland was the senior minister present, and earnestly promoted the union. Next year the clergy of Craven petitioned Sharp to suppress the academy. Sharp wrote to Tillotson for advice. Tillotson evidently did not like the business, and suggested to Sharp (14 June 1692), as 'the fairest and softest way of ridding' his 'hands of' it, that he should see Frankland and explain that the objection to licensing his academy was not based upon his nonconformity. His school was not required in the district, and it was contrary to the bishop's oath to license public instruction in 'university learning.' Sharp saw Frankland after a confirmation at Skipton and invited the nonconformist to Bishopthorpe. Here, with the help of a pipe of tobacco and a glass of good wine, a very friendly interview took place in the library, Sharp courteously declining controversy and inviting confidential hints about the state of the diocese (according to Frankland in a latter to Ralph Thoresby, 6 November 1694). The archbishop's goodwill did not stop further proceedings. From a letter of Richard Stretton, presbyterian minister at Haberdashers' Hall, London, to Thoresby, it appears that early in 1695 there was a prosecution against Frankland; on 10 February the indictment was quashed. In 1697 he was brought before the spiritual court, but at Michaelmas the case was postponed, apparently by the archbishop's order. Calamy states that his troubles continued till the year of his death, but no further particulars are available. Oliver Heywood's diaries are full of references to the academy and its students, and to Frankland's labours at ordinations.

=== Death ===
His health began to break in 1697, when he was troubled with gravel. But he persevered in his work to the last, and died in the midst of his scholars on 1 October 1698. He was buried on 5 October in Giggleswick Church, where his daughters placed an ornate mural tablet to his memory, being a facsimile of the monument to John Lambert, son of Major-general Lambert, in Kirkby Malham Church. His funeral sermon was preached some time after by John Chorlton, who transferred the 'northern academy' to Manchester.

== Marriage ==
He married Elizabeth Sanderson of Hedley Hope, in the parish of Brancepeth, Durham (buried 5 January 1691), and had at least two sons (1. John, born 13 August 1659, entered the academy 3 May 1678, and died in June 1679, 'the strongest man of his age in and about Natland;' 2. Richard, baptised 8 June 1668, entered the academy 13 April 1680, died of the smallpox, and was buried at Sheffield 4 May 1689) and three daughters (1. Barbary, born 16 April 1661, and buried 5 August 1662; 2. Elizabeth, baptised 25 August 1664 (this is the 'Mrs. Frankland' mentioned by Oliver Heywood as collecting materials for a memoir of her father); 3. Margaret, married 19 June 1701 to Samuel Smith (d 1732) of York).

== Publication ==
He published only Reflections on a Letter writ by a nameless Author to the Reverend Clergy of both Universities, 1697. The tract is excessively rare; from the state of one of the two known copies, Aspland conjectures that most of the impression was accidentally destroyed; it is more probable that it had a purely local circulation. It has a preface by Oliver Heywood (dated 11 March; not included in his works). The Letter to which it is a reply was published in 1694 (dated 10 December), and is a plea by a churchman for moderation towards unitarians; Heywood's preface suggests that it had got into the hands of Frankland's students. The Reflections, written in failing health, are justly described by Heywood as 'able' and 'uncouth.'
