= Timothy Jollie =

English nonconformist minister and tutor (c. 1659–1714)

Timothy Jollie, (c. 1659–1714), was a nonconformist minister and notable educator in the north of England.

== Biography ==
Timothy Jollie was the son of the preacher Thomas Jollie. He was born at Altham, Accrington, Lancashire, about 1659. On 27 August 1673 he entered the dissenting academy of Richard Frankland at Rathmell, Yorkshire. He left it in December 1675 to study in London, where he became a member of the independent church at Girdlers' Hall, Basinghall Street, under George Griffith. In 1679 he was called to an independent church in a newly erected meeting-house at Snig Hall, Sheffield. He was ordained on 28 April 1681 by his father, with Oliver Heywood and two other ministers, at the house of Abel Yates in Sheffield. Heywood notes the occasion as remarkable, seeing that an independent church, with but two objectors, allowed their pastor to be ordained by presbyters. In 1682 Jollie was arrested under the Five Miles Act, fined £20, taken to York, and bound over to appear at the next assizes. Refusing then to take an oath of ‘good behaviour,’ he was imprisoned for six months in York Castle, where, in June 1683, he was visited by Heywood. He was released on 1 October 1683.

== Jollie's academy ==
From 1686 to 1689 Frankland had held his academy at Attercliffe, on the outskirts of Sheffield. On his return in July 1689 with the academy to Rathmell, Jollie started an independent academy at Attercliffe. The London Presbyterian fund sent him a few students, but none after 1696. By May 1700 he had sent out forty ministers, and had twenty-six in training. Not thirty names of his students are known, but the list includes Thomas Bradbury, Benjamin Grosvenor, D.D., William Harris, D.D. (1675?–1740), John Bowes (1690–1767), Lord Chancellor of Ireland, Thomas Secker (in 1708–9), archbishop of Canterbury, and Nicholas Saunderson, scientist and mathematician. Grosvenor commends the excellence of his discipline and the charm of his eloquence, and thinks that his exemplary character compensated for shortcomings in his learning. It appears that mathematical studies were prohibited ‘as tending to scepticism and infidelity,’ but many of the students ‘by stealth made a considerable progress’ in this department. After Jollie's death the academy was continued by John Wadsworth till 1718, and perhaps later.

Thomas Secker held a critical opinion of the Jollie's academy; according to the Encyclopædia Britannica Eleventh Edition he was frustrated by Jollie's poor teaching, famously remarking that he lost his knowledge of languages and that 'only the old Philosophy of the Schools was taught there: and that neither ably nor diligently. The morals also of many of the young Men were bad. I spent my time there idly & ill'.

== Upper Chapel ==
In 1700 a new meeting-house, since known as the Upper Chapel, was built for Jollie at Sheffield, the old building being converted into an almshouse and school. His hearers formed the largest nonconformist congregation in Yorkshire. His letter to Heywood in 1701 shows that he shared Heywood's alarm at the rise of ‘novellists’, or innovators upon the orthodoxy of Calvinism. Harmony prevailed among his own flock, but there was an angry division immediately after his death, the great majority abandoning independence, but retaining the meeting-house.

== Death, family ==
Jollie died on Easter day, 28 March 1714, and was buried on 31 March in the graveyard at the Upper Chapel, where his tombstone bears a Latin inscription, which gives his age ‘ætatis suæ 56.’ His funeral sermon was preached by his assistant, John de la Rose.

He married Elizabeth (d 20 January 1709), daughter of James Fisher (d 1666), the ejected vicar of Sheffield, with whom he had two sons, Thomas and Timothy, both of whom became independent ministers.

== Publications ==
He published:

1. A Funeral Sermon for … Rev. Thomas Jollie', 1704,
2. A Memorial, or a Character of Mr. Thomas Whitaker, 1712, (prefixed to a volume of Whitaker's sermons, edited by Jollie and Thomas Bradbury)
