= Vincent Alsop =

English Nonconformist clergyman

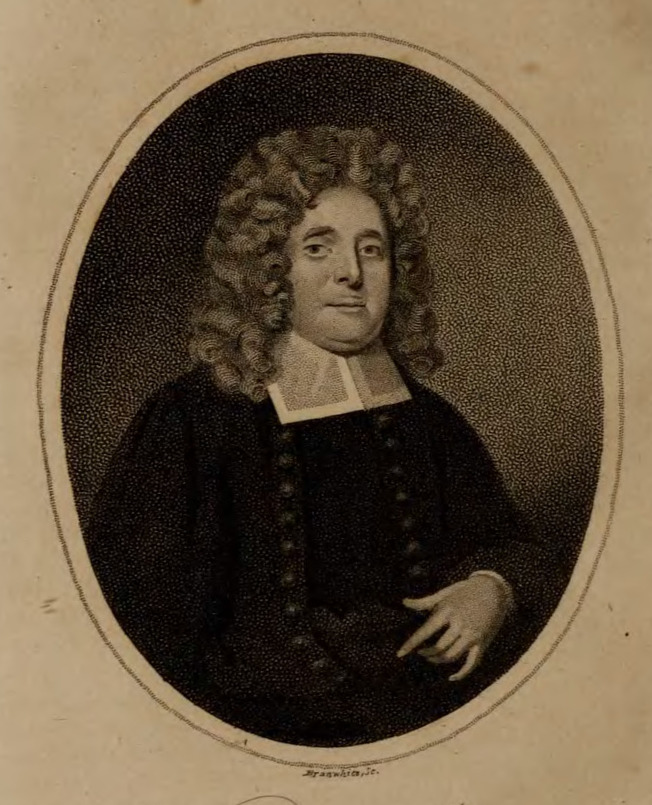
- Died: 8 May 1703 (in Julian calendar)

Vincent Alsop (30 August 1630 – 8 May 1703) was an English Nonconformist clergyman. His Mischief of Separation and Melius Inquirenduni became landmarks in the history of religious nonconformity.

== Life ==
Alsop was the son of the Rector of South Collingham, Nottinghamshire and was educated at St John's College, Cambridge. He received deacon's orders from a bishop, and settled as assistant-master in the free school of Oakham, Rutland. The Rev. Benjamin King took him under his wing, and he married King's daughter. He was thus converted to King's religious beliefs, and received ordination in the Presbyterian denomination, not being satisfied with that which he had from the bishop. He was presented to the living of Wilby, Northamptonshire, but lost it as a result of the Act of Uniformity 1662.

After this he preached privately at Oakham and Wellingborough, and suffered accordingly. He was imprisoned for six months for praying with a sick person. A book against William Sherlock, dean of St Paul's, called Antisozzo (against Socinus), written in the vein of Andrew Marvell's The Rehearsal Transpros'd, made him a name as a wit. He was also invited to succeed the venerable Thomas Cawton (the younger) as independent minister in Westminster. He accepted the call and drew great crowds to his chapel.

He published other books which showed a strong vein of wit, as well as great powers of reasoning. Even with John Goodman and Edward Stillingfleet for antagonists, he more than held his own. His Mischief of Impositions (1680) in answer to Stillingfleet's Mischief of Separation, and Melius Inquirenduni (1679) in answer to Goodman's Compassionate Inquiry, remain historical landmarks in the history of nonconformity.

As a result of the involvement of his son in alleged treasonable practices, he had to appeal to and obtained pardon from James II of England. This seems to have given a somewhat diplomatic character to his later years, inasmuch as, while remaining a nonconformist, he had a good deal to do with proposed political-ecclesiastical compromises.

Two polemical works once thought to be his – A Reply to the Reverend Dean of St. Paul's Reflections on the Rector of Sutton, &c. (1681) and The Rector of Sutton Committed with the Dean of St. Paul's, or, A Defence of Dr. Stillingfleet's Irenicum (1680) – have also been attributed to the Nottingham Presbyterian John Barret.

Upon Alsop's death, his significant personal library was sold at retail. No catalog survives.

== Bibliography ==
- 1678 - Melius inquirendum. or a sober inquirie, ...
- 1680 - An exercitation on that historical relation, ...
- 1680 - The mischief of impositions: ...
- 1681 - A reply to the reverend Dean of St. Paul's reflections
- 1681 - Melius inquirendum, or a sober inquiry, ...
- 1687 - Mr. Alsop's speech to King James II ...
- 1695 - Duty and interest united ...
- 1696 - Decus & tutamen: or, practical godliness, ...
- 1696 - God in the mount. A sermon ...
- 1698 - A vindication of the faithful rebuke ...
