= Rathmell =

Village and civil parish in North Yorkshire, England

Coordinates: 54°02′07″N 2°18′01″W

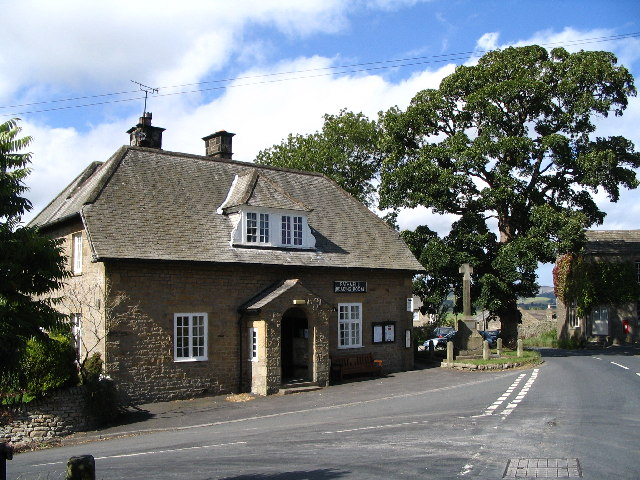
- Rathmell Reading Room

- Location within North Yorkshire
- OS grid reference: SD804598
- Civil parish: Rathmell
- Unitary authority: North Yorkshire
- Ceremonial county: North Yorkshire
- Region: Yorkshire and the Humber
- Country: England
- Sovereign state: United Kingdom
- Post town: Settle
- Postcode district: BD24
- Police: North Yorkshire
- Fire: North Yorkshire
- Ambulance: Yorkshire

Rathmell is a village and civil parish in the county of North Yorkshire, England. The population of the civil parish in the 2011 census was 305. It is close to the River Ribble and about three miles south of Settle. Other towns and villages nearby include Wigglesworth, Tosside, Giggleswick and Long Preston.

Until 1974 it was part of the West Riding of Yorkshire. From 1974 to 2023 it was part of the Craven District, it is now administered by the unitary North Yorkshire Council.

== Origins ==
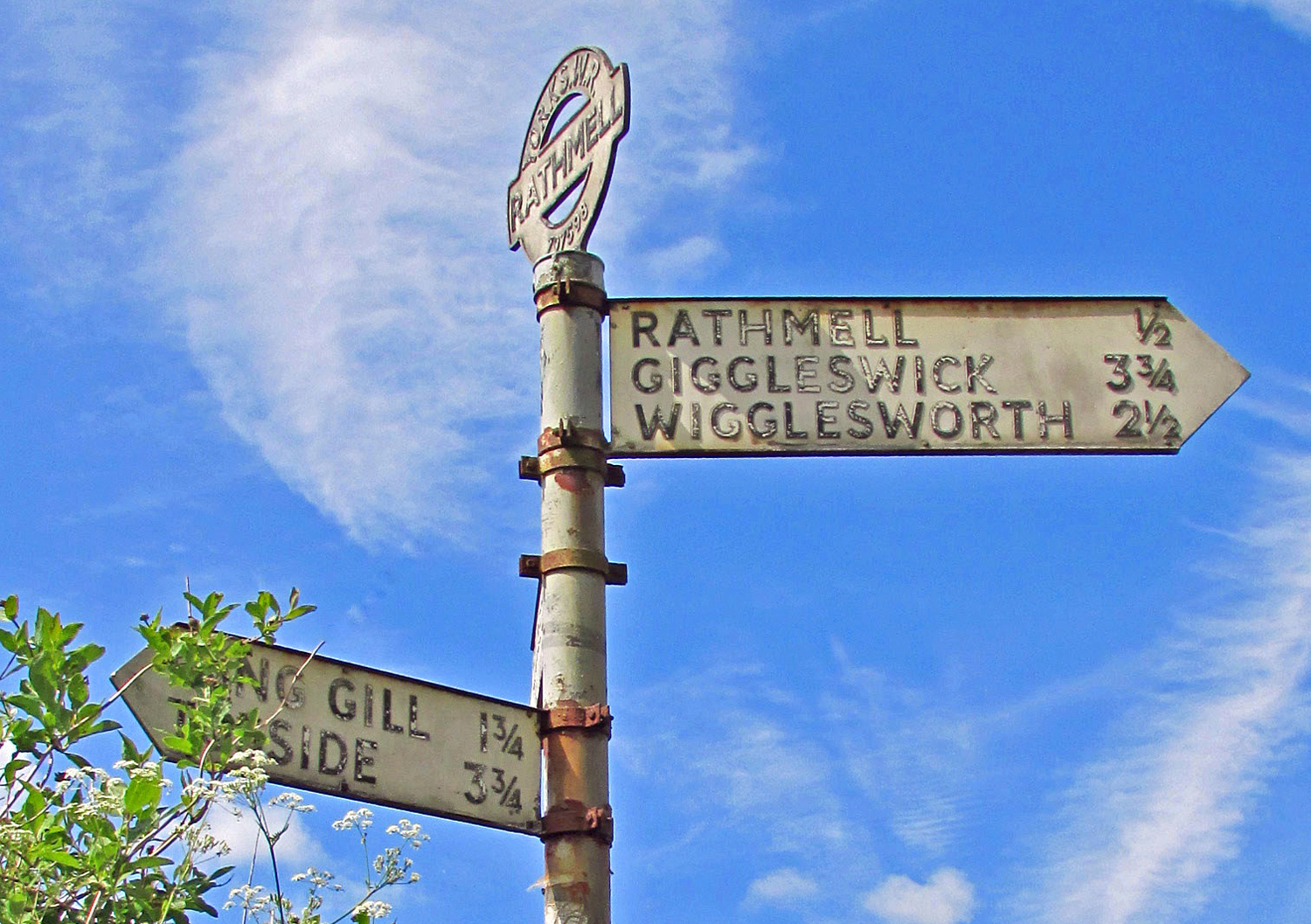
Signpost near the village showing directions to local communities and recording the pre-1974 location within Yorkshire West Riding

The name Rathmell comes from Old Norse rauðr 'red' + melr 'sandbank'. Indeed, the area has a long history of Norse settlement. Rathmell was formerly a township in the parish of Gigggleswick, in 1866 Rathmell became a civil parish in its own right. On 1 April 1938 432 acres was transferred from Gisburn Forest.

== Dissenting academy ==
Rathmell is the birthplace of Richard Frankland (1630–1698), the nonconformist divine. He was ordained by presbyters under the Cromwellian regime, but was ejected from his ministry at the Restoration. He retired home to Rathmell, where he founded a dissenting academy, which migrated to Manchester after his death. This academy was the germ of the institution now known as Harris Manchester College, Oxford. The location of the original Academy at Rathmell is marked by a memorial plaque on the end of a small terrace of cottages which still bears the name "College Fold".

== Notable people ==
- Martin Kaye, resident of the village

== See also ==
- Listed buildings in Rathmell

== Bibliography ==
- Edward Allen Bell, The History of Giggleswick School 1499–1912, Leeds: Richard Jackson, 1912.
- Harold Blaxland Atkinson, The Giggleswick School Register 1499–1921, Newcastle upon Tyne: Northumberland Press, 1922.
