= Regium Donum =

British annual grant to poor clergy

The Regium Donum (Latin: "Royal Bounty") in British history was an annual grant to augment the income of poor Nonconformist clergy. There were separate grants for English Dissenters and for Irish Presbyterian clergy. The money originally came from the monarch's privy purse as an ex gratia donation, but it later became an annual grant voted by Parliament.

The Irish Regium Donum originated in a grant of £1,200 pa to Presbyterian clergy in the north of Ireland made by William III in 1690 as a reward for the loyalty of Presbyterians during the war in Ireland following the Glorious Revolution. Queen Anne, when instituting "Queen Anne's Bounty" to augment poor Anglican livings, also added another £800 pa to assist Presbyterian clergy in the rest of Ireland (an offer of similar assistance to English Dissenting Ministers was declined). The Irish Church Act 1869, whose main purpose was to disestablish the Anglican Church of Ireland, also discontinued the Irish Regium Donum (and the grant to the Roman Catholic St Patrick's College, Maynooth) from 1871; existing ministers continued to receive equivalent payment from the Church Temporalities Commission.

The English Regium Donum was instituted in 1723, originally £500 pa to allow the payment of pensions of widows of Dissenting Ministers, but later increased to £1,000 pa to also cover augmentation of income of living ministers. From Charles II onwards, there had been earlier royal donations to Dissenting clergymen, but political motives were suspected, and a proposed grant of £1,000 pa by Queen Anne was declined. The Regium Donum was originally not publicised, and one eighteenth-century critic saw it as a secret bribe to Dissenters to support Sir Robert Walpole and to buy off any agitation against the civil disabilities of Dissenters (e.g. the Test and Corporation Acts).

Reform of royal finances by Pitt the Younger resulted in the Regium Donum becoming a grant voted by Parliament, rather than a charge upon the Civil List. In principle, this changed it from an ex gratia payment to a forced donation by taxpayers (including those opposed to the religious views of those supported): the Regium Donum was therefore henceforth opposed (on the grounds of consistency) by some advocates of the disestablishment of the Church of England. There was growing opposition by organised Dissent; because of this, the government announced in 1851 that the Regium Donum would not be voted in subsequent years.
