= Walter Wilson (biographer) =

English biographer (c. 1781 – 1847)

Walter Wilson (1781?–1847) was an English biographer of nonconformist clergy and their churches.

== Life ==
He was born about 1781, the illegitimate son of John Walter, the newspaper publisher and Catherine Wilson. He was brought up a Presbyterian, and went to work at East India House as a clerk. In 1802 he went into journalism, and in 1806 he became a bookseller. He took the bookshop at the Mewsgate, Charing Cross, vacated by Thomas Payne the younger.

He was living in Camden Town in 1808; his father died in 1812, leaving him a shareholder in The Times. He entered the Inner Temple, but never practised at the bar. He moved to Dorset, and again to Burnet, near Bath, Somerset, where he did some farming. Here he had a congenial neighbour in Joseph Hunter; they exchanged copies of collections of dissenting antiquities.

About 1834 he moved from Burnet to Pulteney Street, Bath. During the progress of the Sarah Hewley suit, Wilson's judgment went entirely with the defendants, and his religious views, probably under Hunter's influence, underwent a change in the Unitarian direction.

Wilson died on 21 February 1847. At the time of his death he was one of the eight registered proprietors of The Times.

== Works ==
Reading the Memoirs of Daniel Neal, prefixed by Joshua Toulmin to his edition (1793–7) of Neal's History of the Puritans, led Wilson to collect notices of dissenting divines, and examine manuscript sources of information. He projected a biographical account of the dissenting congregations of London and the vicinity. For his projected work he obtained around three hundred subscribers. He published an instalment of The History and Antiquities of Dissenting Churches and Meeting Houses in London, Westminster, and Southwark: including the Lives of their Ministers in 1808, 2 vols. A third volume of his Dissenting Churches appeared in 1810; a fourth in 1814, with a preface (1 May 1814) showing his personal interest in the older types of nonconformity. According to Alexander Gordon in the Dictionary of National Biography, the later volumes of his work exhibit a softer attitude towards the free-thinkers of dissent, and his facts are given fairly. By 1818 he was ready to publish a fifth and completing volume, if five hundred subscribers could be obtained; but it never appeared.

In 1822 he announced a life of Daniel Defoe, of whose publications he had made a much larger collection than had previously been brought together. His Memoirs of the Life and Times of Daniel De Foe 1830, 3 vols., is heavy, but was well reviewed by Thomas Babington Macaulay (1845). He had projected a supplementary work dealing with Defoe's literary antagonists. Wilson attributed 210 works to Defoe, in some cases loosely or with caveats, adding about 80 items to the list given by George Chalmers.

== Legacy ==
His library was sold (5–17 July 1847) and broken up. He bequeathed his manuscript collections for the history of dissent to Dr. Williams's Library; a list of these, by the then librarian, Richard Cogan, was printed in the Christian Reformer (1847, p. 758).

== Family ==
He was twice married, and left a son, Henry Walter Wilson of the Inner Temple, and a daughter, married to Norman Garstin, colonial chaplain at Ceylon.
