= Attercliffe =

Suburb of Sheffield, England

Coordinates: 53.394°N 1.433°W

- Location within Sheffield
- OS grid reference: SK378887
- Metropolitan borough: City of Sheffield
- Metropolitan county: South Yorkshire
- Region: Yorkshire and the Humber
- Country: England
- Sovereign state: United Kingdom
- Post town: SHEFFIELD
- Postcode district: S9
- Dialling code: 0114
- Police: South Yorkshire
- Fire: South Yorkshire
- Ambulance: Yorkshire
- UK Parliament: Sheffield South East

Attercliffe is an industrial suburb of northeast Sheffield, England on the south bank of the River Don. The suburb falls in the Darnall ward of Sheffield City Council.

== History ==
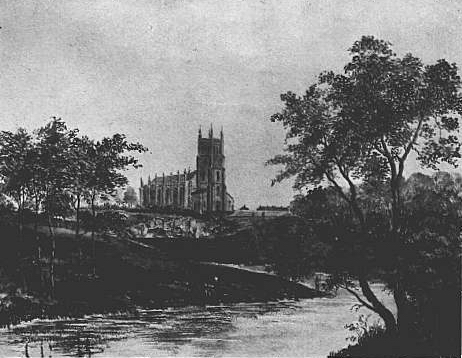
Christ Church from across the River Don in 1826. The "cliff" can be seen in front of the church.

The name Attercliffe can be traced back as far as an entry in the Domesday Book of 1086 - Ateclive – meaning “at the cliff”, a small escarpment that lay alongside the River Don. This cliff can be seen in images from the 19th century, but is no longer visible.

Westforth or Washford Bridge, at the Sheffield end of the village, was first recorded in a will of 1535. It was rebuilt in wood in 1608 and 1647, then in stone in 1672, 1789 and 1794.

Historically a part of the parish of Sheffield, Attercliffe Chapel was built in 1629 as the first place of worship in the settlement. The Town School was built in 1779, and Christ Church was built in 1826 but destroyed during the Second World War.

In 1686, Richard Frankland set up a dissenting academy at Attercliffe Hall. Three years later, it was taken over by the nonconformist minister Timothy Jollie, who educated students including John Bowes, Nicholas Saunderson and Thomas Secker. Secker, later Archbishop of Canterbury, was frustrated by Jollie's poor teaching, famously remarking that he lost his knowledge of languages and that 'only the old Philosophy of the Schools was taught there: and that neither ably nor diligently. The morals also of many of the young Men were bad. I spent my time there idly & ill'.

In the early 19th century, Attercliffe remained a rural community known for its orchards, windmill, and large houses including the Old Hall, New Hall and Carlton House. New Hall was later converted into pleasure gardens, with a cricket ground, racecourse, bowling green, maze, lake and depictions of famous cities. It was known for its concerts and firework displays.

Small-scale manufacture of pen knives and pocket knives developed in the early 19th century, The suburb became more accessible with the construction of first a turnpike road from Sheffield to the terminus of the River Don Navigation at Tinsley, then the opening of the Sheffield Canal, running to the south of the village. In the late 19th and early 20th centuries, there was a frequent proposal to widen this to form a Sheffield Ship Canal, to terminate in a basin at Attercliffe.

Attercliffe railway station opened in August 1871 and closed on 26 September 1927.

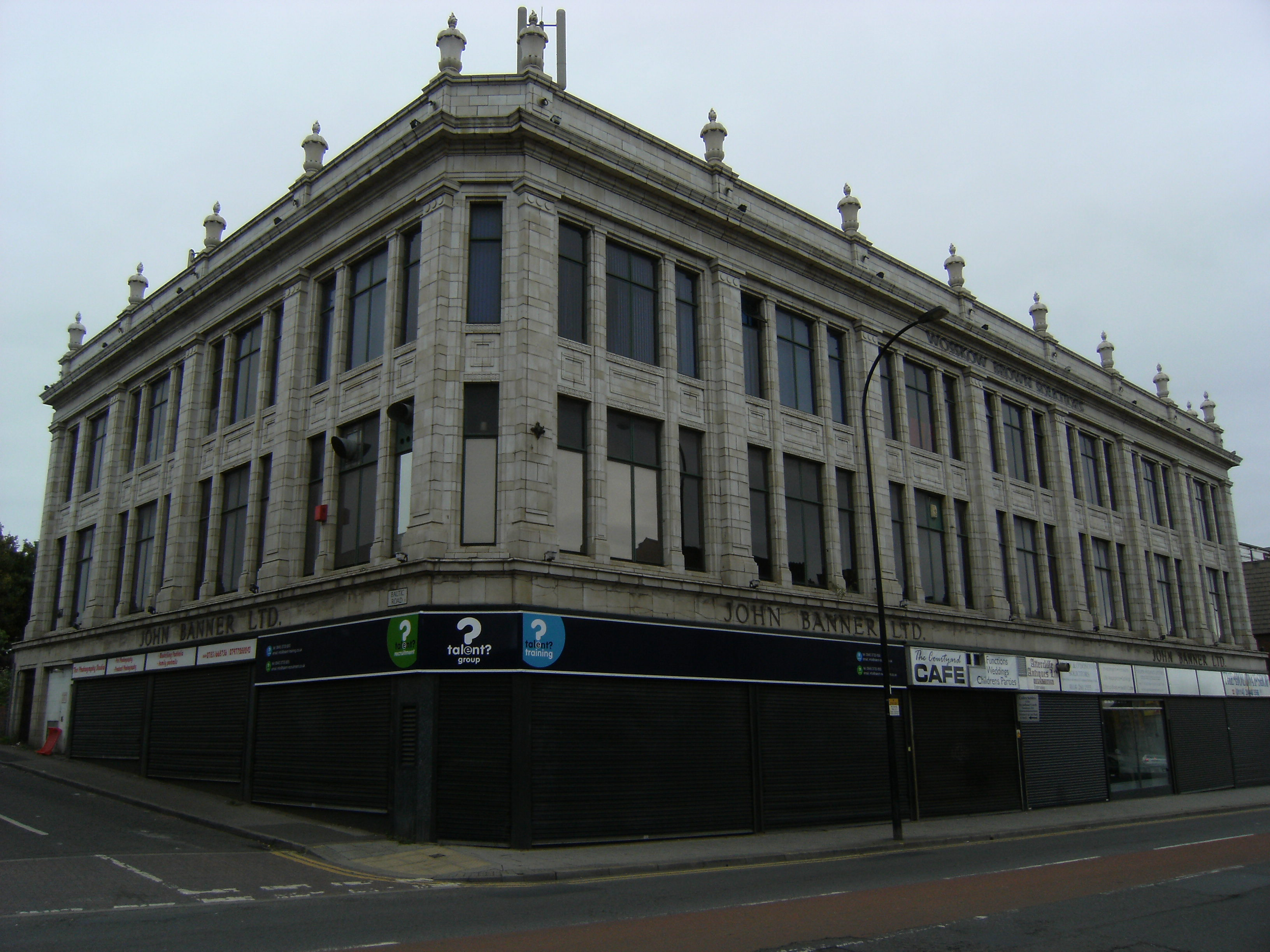
The former John Banner department store

Attercliffe has long been an industrial area, but by the early 20th century, there was also a large residential population and high class shops, John Banner's department store (Banner's), which opened in 1934, in particular. The area declined after the Second World War as Victorian housing was cleared and not replaced, causing schools to close, followed by most of Attercliffe's shops. Banner's closed in 1980 and was converted into offices. Some of the local industries closed or moved to larger sites further out of Sheffield.

=== Adelphi Cinema ===
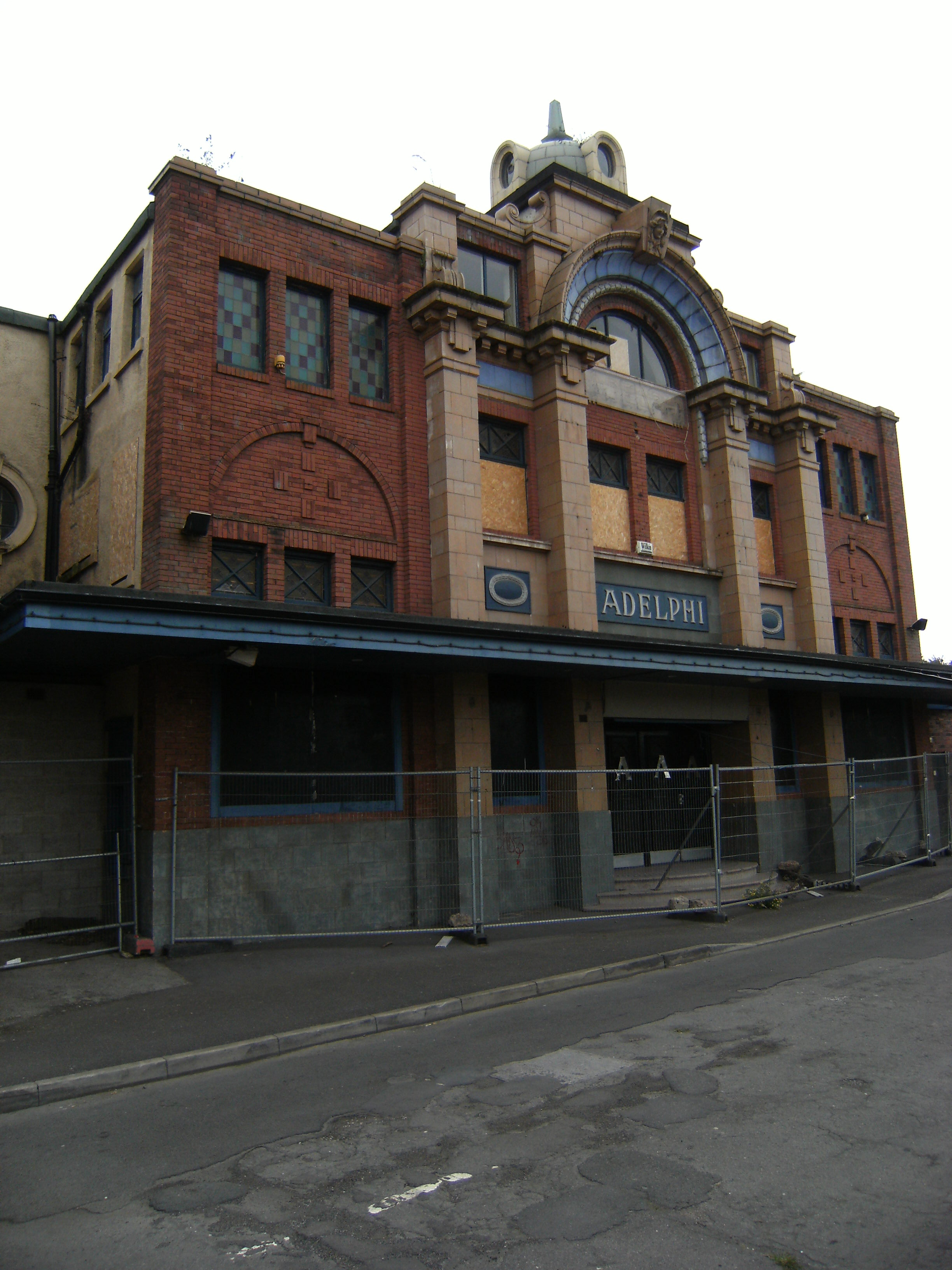
The former Adelphi Cinema

The Adelphi was an art deco cinema on Vicarage Road, built in 1920 by architect William C. Fenton. It is Grade II listed. The cinema closed in 1967, and the building was then used as a bingo hall under the name "Adelphi Bingo Club" and a nightclub. It is currently disused. In November 2022 Sheffield Council announced plans to redevelop the building for community use.

== Attractions ==
The inclusion of Attercliffe on the Supertram network (Attercliffe tram stop), the completion of the Five Weirs Walk and construction of the Don Valley Stadium and Sheffield Arena in the 1990s brought some life back to the area. As part of the area's regeneration, new house building started in 2002. Don Valley Stadium was demolished in 2013, but other entertainment venues bring visitors to the area, including Hollywood Bowl and Cineworld. This has changed Attercliffe from its previous seedy element to an area for outer city entertainment with the introduction of Valley Centertainment.

It is home to one of the highest concentrations of sporting facilities in the UK with the Olympic Legacy Park, incorporating iceSheffield and the English Institute of Sport.

== Politics ==
Attercliffe falls within the Darnall Ward. Sheffield Attercliffe was the name of one of Sheffield's parliamentary constituencies from 1885 to 2010, when it was renamed Sheffield South East.
