= Edmund Calamy (historian) =

English Nonconformist churchman and historian (1671–1732)

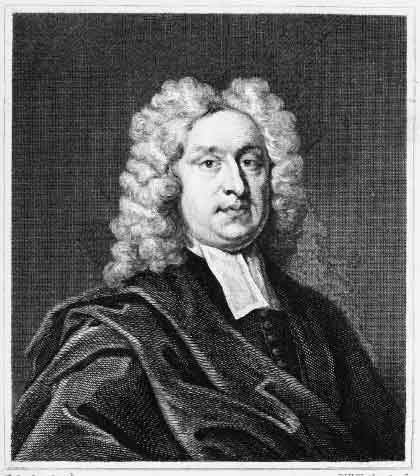
- Edmund Calamy, III, the grandson
- Born: 5 April 1671; London, England
- Died: 3 June 1732 (aged 61)
- Education: University of Oxford
- Known for: Nonconformist churchman and historian

Edmund Calamy (5 April 1671 – 3 June 1732) was an English Nonconformist churchman and historian.

== Life ==
He was the son of Edmund Calamy the Younger and grandson of Edmund Calamy the Elder. He was born in the City of London, in the parish of St Mary Aldermanbury. He was sent to various schools, including Merchant Taylors', and in 1688 proceeded to Utrecht University. While there, he declined an offer of a professor's chair in the University of Edinburgh made to him by the principal, William Carstares, who had gone over on purpose to find suitable men for such posts.

After his return to England in 1691 he began to study divinity, and on Richard Baxter's advice went to Oxford, where he was much influenced by William Chillingworth. He declined invitations from Andover and Bristol, and accepted one as assistant to Matthew Sylvester at Blackfriars, London (1692). In June 1694 he was publicly ordained at Samuel Annesley's meeting-house in Little St Helen's, Bishopsgate, and soon afterwards was invited to become assistant to Daniel Williams in Hand Alley, Bishopsgate. In 1702 he was chosen one of the lecturers in Salters' Hall, and in 1703 he succeeded Vincent Alsop as pastor of a large congregation in Tothill Street, Westminster. Calamy was a moderate Presbyterian, following the theology of Baxter.

In 1709 Calamy made a tour through Scotland, and had the degree of Doctor of Divinity conferred on him by the universities of Edinburgh, Aberdeen and Glasgow.

His friendship with Williams was important for his development as a historian. He was appointed one of the original trustees of the Presbyterian Fund in 1703, and, on the foundation of Dr Williams Charity, was his legacy trustee. This enabled the construction of the Dr Williams's Library in Red Cross Street.

He died on 3 June 1732 and was buried on 9 June at St Mary Aldermanbury. He married twice, leaving six of his thirteen children to survive him. His eldest son was Edmund Calamy IV (1698-1755), Presbyterian minister in London. His son (Edmund, the fifth) was a barrister who died in 1816; and this one's son (Edmund, the sixth) died in 1850, his younger brother Michael, the last of the direct Calamy line, surviving till 1876.

== Works ==
Calamy's forty-one publications are mainly sermons, but his fame rests on his nonconformist biographies. His great hero was Richard Baxter, of whom he wrote three distinct memoirs.

His first essay was a table of contents to Baxter's Narrative of his life and times, which was sent to the press in 1696; he made some remarks on the work itself and added to it an index, and, reflecting on the usefulness of the book, he saw the expediency of continuing it, as Baxter's history came no further than the year 1684. Accordingly, he composed an abridgment of it, with an account of many other ministers who were ejected in 1662 after the Restoration of Charles II; their apology, containing the grounds of their nonconformity and practice as to stated and occasional communion with the Church of England; and a continuation of their history until the year 1691. This work was published in 1702. The most important chapter (ix.) is that which gives a detailed account of the ministers ejected in 1662; it was afterwards published as a distinct volume. He afterwards published a moderate defence of Nonconformity, in three tracts, in answer to some tracts of Benjamin Hoadly.

In 1713 he published a second edition (2 vols.) of his Abridgment of Baxter's History, in which, among various additions, there is a continuation of the history through the reigns of William III and Anne, down to the passing of the Occasional Conformity Act 1711. At the end of volume 1 is subjoined the reformed liturgy, which was drawn up and presented to the bishops in 1661. Volume 2 is an expansion of chapter ix. of the 1702 edition giving greater detail about ministers ejected in 1662.

In 1718 he wrote a vindication of his grandfather and several other persons against certain reflections cast upon them by Laurence Echard in his History of England. In 1719 he published The Church and the Dissenters Compar'd as to Persecution, and 1727 saw his Continuation of the Account of the ejected ministers and teachers, a volume which is really a series of emendations of the previously published account.

- A Defence of Moderate Non-Conformity: In Answer to the Reflections of Mr. Ollyffe and Mr. Hoadly, on the Tenth Chapter of the Abridgment of the Life of the Reverend Mr. Rich. Baxter (1703)
  - Volume 1
  - Volume 2
  - Volume 3
- The Inspiration of the Holy Writings of the Old and New Testament Consider'd and Improv'd.: In Fourteen Sermons Preach'd at the Merchants Lecture at Salters Hall (1710)
- An account of the Ministers, Lecturers, Masters, and Fellows of Colleges and Schoolmasters: Who Were Ejected or Silenced after the Restoration in 1660, By or Before, the Act of Uniformity; Design'd for the Preserving to Posterity the Memory of Their Names, Characters, Writings, and Sufferings (1713)
- A Letter to Mr. Archdeacon Echard Upon Occasion of his History of England... (1718)
- An Answer to Dr. Edmund Calamy's Letter to Mr. Archdeacon Echard Upon Occasion of his History of England... (1718)
- Thirteen Sermons Concerning the Doctrine of the Trinity: Preached at the Merchant's-Lecture, at Salter's-Hall; Together with a Vindication of That Celebrated Text, I John v. 7 from Being Spurious... (1722)

== Sources ==
- The correspondence of the Rev. Robert Wodrow
