= Luguvalium =

Roman city in Britain, now Carlisle, Cumbria

Coordinates: 54.895°N 2.937°W

Luguvalium (or Luguvalium Carvetiorum) was an ancient Roman city in northern Britain located within present-day Carlisle, Cumbria, and may have been the capital of the 4th-century province of Valentia. It was the northernmost city of the Roman Empire.

== Name ==
The Romans called the settlement Luguvalium which is now explained as a borrowed Brittonic placename reconstructed as *Luguwalion, meaning "[city] of Luguwalos", Luguwalos being a masculine Celtic given name meaning "strength of Lugus". The name apparently continued in use among Brythonic speakers in the Hen Ogledd and Wales and it was during that time that the initial element caer ("fort") was added. The place is mentioned in Welsh sources such as Nennius, who calls it Cair Ligualid, and the Book of Taliesin where it is rendered Caer Liwelyδ (Modern Welsh Caerliwelydd). (These derived from the original Brittonic name, rather than from its Latin form.) The earliest record of the place in English is as Luel (c. 1050); later medieval forms include Cardeol, Karlioli, and Cærleoil. These appear to suggest that the northern form of the name did not have the final -ydd. (Compare the River Derwent in Cumbria with Derwenydd in Wales, both from Brittonic *Derwentjū.)

== Location ==
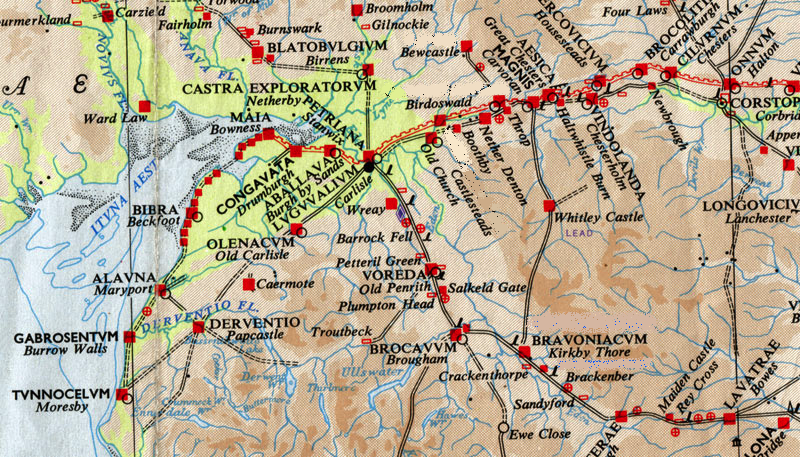
Roman roads, forts and towns around Luguvalium

The city was located on a crossroads of major Roman north-south and east-west roads and situated near to the Roman frontier, first defined by the Stanegate road and then by Hadrian's Wall, leading to Luguvalium’s development as a supply base and major military and commercial centre. It also protected a strategic location and trade route overlooking the confluence of the Caldew and Eden rivers.

Today the Roman city is located mainly under the modern city of Carlisle, but the Roman fort around which the settlement developed is mainly beneath the grounds of the later Carlisle Castle.

== History ==
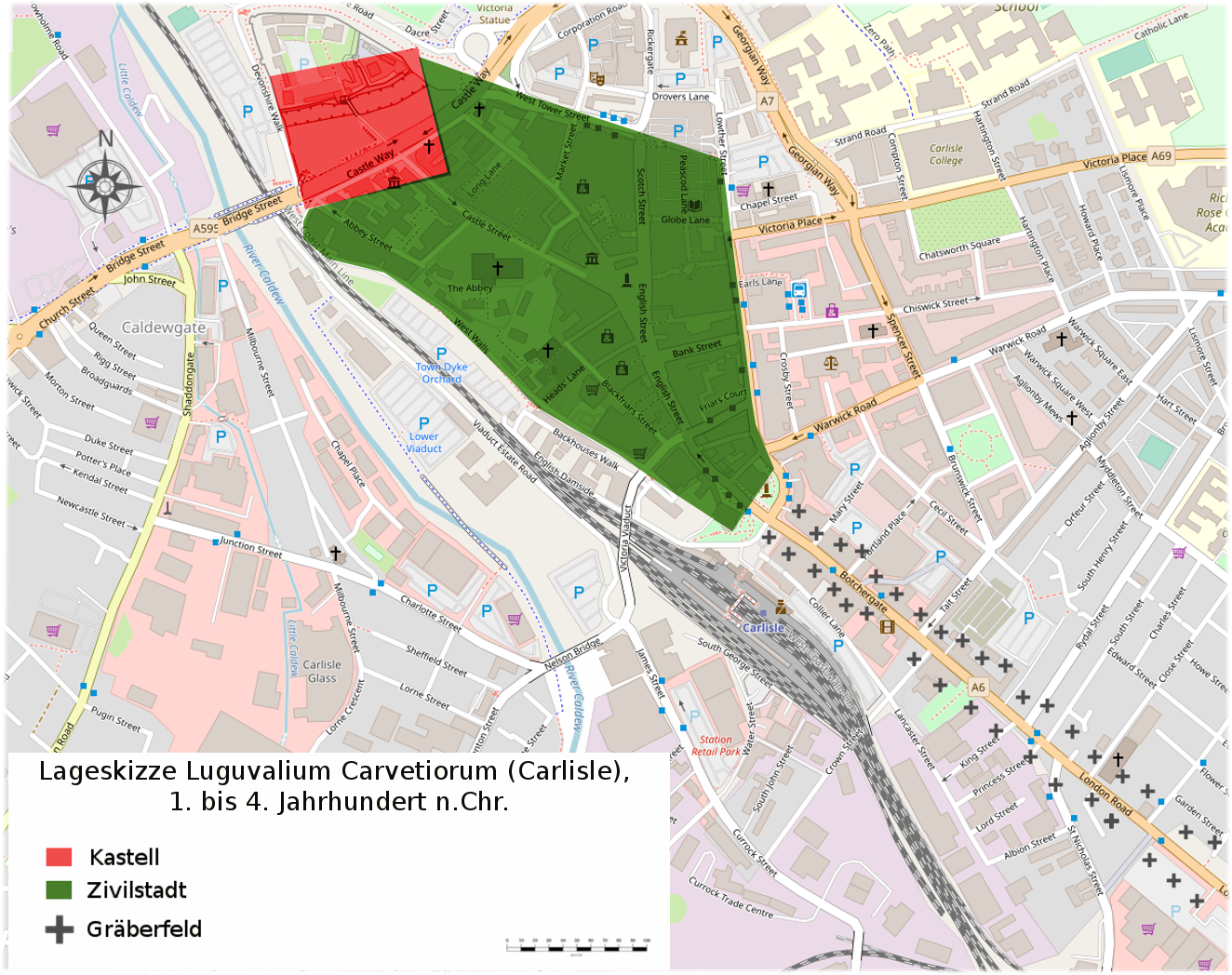
Map of fort (red) and vicus or civilian settlement (green) of Luguvalium Carvetiorum

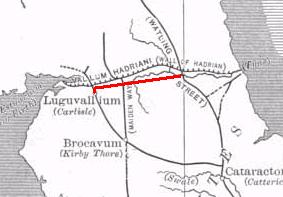
The Stanegate road and frontier; the road continued west of Carlisle to Kirkbride.

=== Prehistoric ===
There are limited remains of a settlement during the British Iron Age. Before the Romans, the chief city of the Carvetii seems to have been Clifton Dykes.

=== Roman ===
Following their earlier conquest of the southern part of Britain, and Boudica's revolt, the Roman armies began to conquer the north and erected a timber fort around 72 AD at a key point south of the River Eden in a loop protected on two sides by water, on the site of the later Carlisle Castle. This fort later became the nucleus of the important Roman town of Luguvalium which grew up outside it. The fort was built by a vexillation of the legion Legio IX Hispana during the final campaign of Cerialis against the Brigantian Venutius.

The fort was refurbished in 83 using oak timbers from further afield, rather than local alder, indicating the greater Roman control of the area, and was garrisoned by a 500-strong cavalry regiment, the Ala Gallorum Sebosiana.

The 'Stanegate' frontier established from about 87 which consisted of Luguvalium and several other forts on the road east to Corbridge, was proving a more stable frontier against the Picts than those established deeper into Caledonia. By the early 2nd century, Carlisle was established as a prominent stronghold. The fort was deliberately demolished around 103 but rebuilt before 105 and retained its garrison until the Hadrianic period. One of the Vindolanda tablets records a centurio regionarius, a Stanegate officer, stationed at Luguvalium in 103.

In 122 the province was visited by the Emperor Hadrian, who approved a plan to build a wall along the frontier slightly to the north of the Stanegate. A new large fort, Uxelodunum, was built therefore on the wall in the Stanwix area of Carlisle north of the river and within sight of the Luguvalium fort and became the largest fort along the length of Hadrian's Wall. Uxellodunum was abandoned like the rest of the wall when the Antonine Wall was built in 142-144, but was rebuilt in stone in about 165 when Hadrian's Wall was reinstated as the frontier. Uxelodunum housed a nominal 1,000-strong cavalry regiment, the Ala Gallorum Petriana, the sole regiment of this size along the wall. Milecastle 65 was also built on the wall about 1km northwest of the fort.

The garrison of the Luguvalium fort was only gradually reduced from 105 until the site was finally levelled and abandoned during the Antonine period (138-161). The fort was rebuilt in stone in about 200 by the Legio XX Valeria Victrix based at York. Timber structures further to the south-east were probably associated military buildings and were also later replaced in stone by soldiers from the 20th legion. The fort was finally abandoned sometime between 275-325.

The civilian settlement (vicus) that developed outside the fort probably became the civitas capital of the Carvetii tribe some time in the 2nd century. It was eventually enclosed by a stone wall assumed to have followed the line of the later medieval wall. Industry in the town included copper working and tanning, while merchants are also in evidence. Inscriptions show there was a Mithraeum in the town and possibly a temple to Mars, who was identified with the local deity Belatucadros.

The town was listed in the Roman Antonine Itinerary (from beginning of the 3rd century).

Coins excavated in the area suggest that Romans remained in Carlisle until the reign of Emperor Valentinian II, from 375 to 392.

=== Medieval ===
Romano-British occupation of Luguvalium seems to have continued unbroken after the Roman withdrawal from Britain around 410. Possible 5th-century buildings have been identified during excavation, and the settlement has been identified as the court of Urien Rheged's kingdom. Saint Cuthbert visited the town in the 7th century and, according to Bede, described the high stone walls and an impressive fountain, presumably fed by a still-functioning aqueduct. The place was under the control of a praepositus civitatis.

Cair Ligualid was listed among the 28 cities of Britain in Nennius (composed after 830).

== Excavations ==
Excavations in the 1950s identified the site of the fort of Luguvalium to the south of the present medieval Carlisle Castle, which lies over the north-eastern corner of the Roman fort. More recent excavations revealed the well-preserved timber structure of the Roman gatehouse and its adjoining rampart.

Three large marching camps near to Carlisle at Plumpton Head, Crackenthorpe and Rey Cross have all been attributed to the campaigns of governor Cerialis and dated sometime around 72/73AD. Tiles and pottery with stamps of the Legio IX Hispana (the fabled "Ninth Legion") have also been found at Scalesceugh 8km south of Carlisle, which indicates that a vexillation was probably involved with the early presence at Carlisle.

Excavations in 1981-84 and 1990 discovered around 50 wooden writing tablets within the Roman fort, containing unique evidence for the cavalry regiment, the ala Gallorum Sebosiana, and its consumption of barley, wheat and weapons. The collection is second in importance only to that from Vindolanda.

In 2017 imperial baths larger than any found near Hadrian's Wall, and possibly belonging to a mansio were discovered just north of the River Eden in the cricket ground. Archaeological artefacts discovered in 2021 suggest that the Roman emperor Septimius Severus and his consort Julia Domna may have spent time in Luguvalium around AD 208-211, since engraved stone fragments dedicated to the empress were found, as well as the emperor's personal workshop-stamped tiles (Severus was campaigning in Scotland at the time). Two oversized sculptures of heads were discovered in 2023, and another one was found in 2024.
