= Rudge Cup =

Bronze cup found in Wiltshire, England

The Rudge Cup is a small enamelled bronze cup found in 1725 at Rudge, near Froxfield, in Wiltshire, England. The cup was found down a well on the site of a Roman villa. It is important in that it lists five of the forts on the western section of Hadrian's Wall, thus aiding scholars in identifying the forts correctly. The information on the cup has been compared with the two major sources of information regarding forts on the Wall, the Notitia Dignitatum and the Ravenna Cosmography.

The cup is in the possession of the Duke of Northumberland and is on display at Alnwick Castle. A replica of the cup is on display at the British Museum.

== Description and use ==
The cup is 46mm high, with a rim diameter of 89-93mm (once circular, now a little squashed). The base, now missing, is 58mm in diameter. The Champlevé enamelling is in three zones: a lower zone consisting of a grid of rectangles; a central zone consisting of fourteen alternating rectangles (these being subdivided into four smaller rectangles with crenellations along the top), alternating with a leaf-shaped design; a third, narrow, grooved channel at the top containing the lettering given below.

It is believed that the cup once formed part of a set of ornamental souvenir bowls. However, the fact that there is no sign of a similar vessel covering the central and eastern sectors of the Wall may suggest otherwise. Whether the Cup was a souvenir for a retired soldier, a libation vessel or a present to be given to other people is something that will probably never be clear.

The Cup appears to show a schematic drawing of Hadrian's Wall originally picked out in coloured enamels with turrets and milecastles, although this is open to debate.

The inscription on the cup is as follows:

.A.MAISABALLAVAVXELODUMCAMBOGLANSBANNA

in a continuous strip. This is now interpreted as:

A MAIS ABALLAVA VXELODUM CAMBOGLANS BANNA

It is believed that these names are from an itinerary of the Wall from west to east, listing the forts as Mais (Bowness), Aballava (Burgh-by-Sands), Uxelodunum (Stanwix), Camboglanna (Castlesteads) and Banna (Birdoswald).

== Dating and manufacture ==
It is likely that the Cup dates to the early 130s AD when interest and pride in the newly completed Wall would have been at their height.

It is unclear as to where and by whom the Cup was made. It may not necessarily have been made near the Wall. It seems possible that the same craftsman made the Cup and the Amiens Patera.

== Other similar sources ==
=== Amiens Skillet ===
The Amiens Skillet, or Amiens Patera, is a bronze bowl with a single long handle found at Amiens, France ( a stopping place for Roman soldiers) in 1949. It is similar to the Rudge Cup in that it has a representation of the Wall and a list of forts from west to east.

The inscription on the bowl is as follows: MAIS ABALLAVA VXELODVNVM CAMBOG...S BANNA ESICA

The six forts listed on the Amiens Patera match the five forts on the Rudge Cup, with the addition of Aesica (Great Chesters). The list differs from the Notitia Dignitatum and the Ravenna Cosmography, in that it misses out Magnis (Carvoran), which should come between Banna (Birdoswald) and Aesica (Great Chesters). It is believed that this omission is because Magnis was not actually attached to the Wall but was south of the Vallum, having been originally built to guard the nearby Stanegate Roman road.

The patera is 56mm high, with a diameter of 100mm; the handle length is 90mm. Below the inscription a red, crenellated, line depicts (figuratively) a wall and seven towers. The base is decorated with rectangles, possibly depicting masonry foundations, coloured in blue and green enamel.

=== Staffordshire Moorlands Pan ===
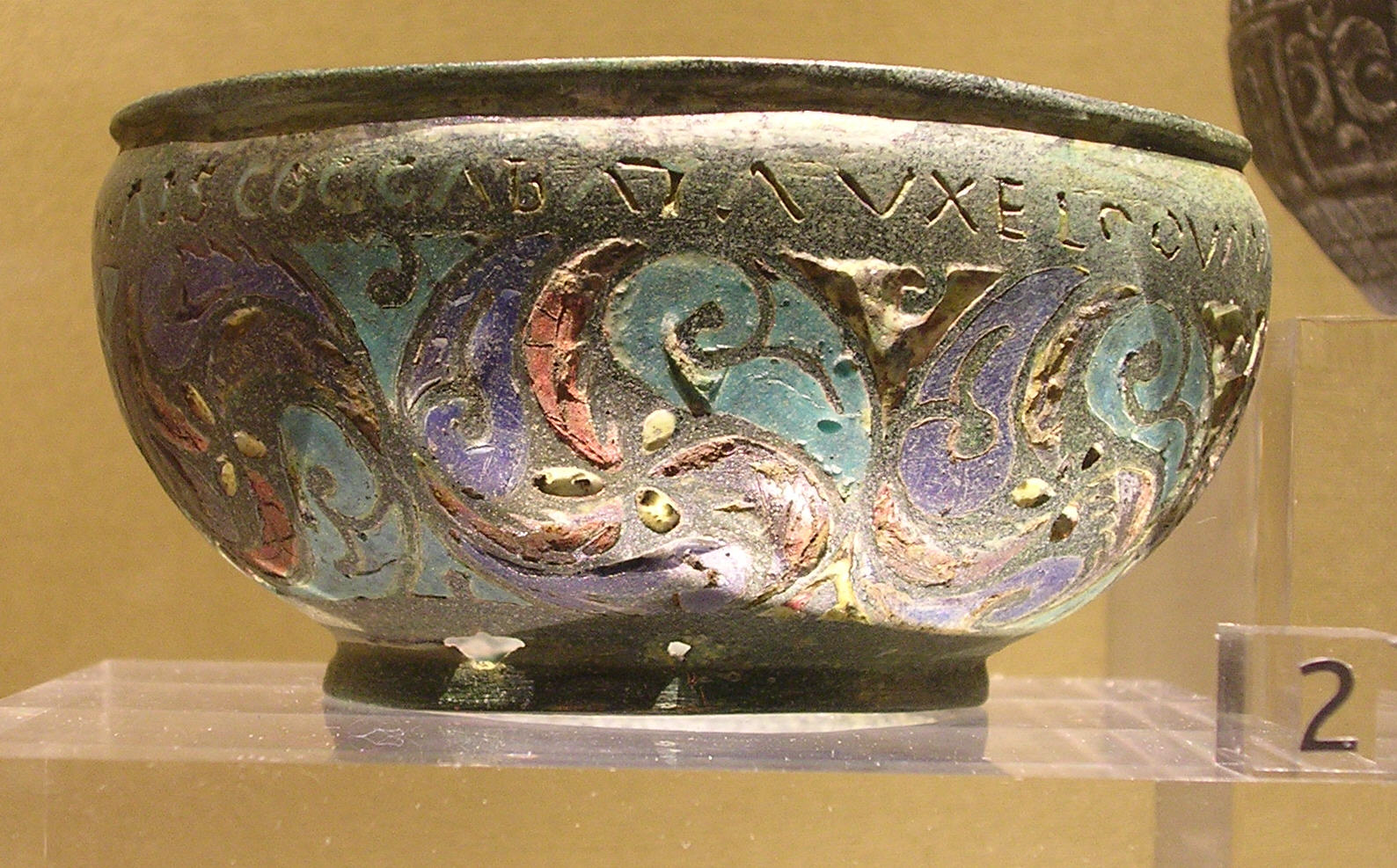
The Staffordshire Moorlands Pan, an enamelled Roman bronze vessel (diameter 89.5 mm) which lists the names of several Roman forts on the western sector of Hadrian's Wall and also the ancient name of the Wall in the form Val[l]i Aeli, the 'Aelian frontier', using part of Hadrian's name which in full was Publius Aelius Hadrianus.

The Staffordshire Moorlands Pan, is a bronze cooking and serving vessel of trulla form found in Staffordshire in 2003. It has elaborate Celtic-style enamelled decoration and had a single handle, now broken. The inscription on the bowl lists four forts on Hadrian's Wall.

The inscription on the cup is as follows: MAIS COGGABATA VXELODVNVM CAMMOGLANNA RIGOREVALI AELI DRACONIS

The four forts listed do not match the first four forts listed on the Rudge Cup and Amiens Skillet. The second fort on the Staffordshire Bowl is Coggabata (Drumburgh), whereas the other two bowls have Aballava (Burgh-by-Sands) as the second fort. The reason for this discrepancy is unclear, but the small size of Coggabata may explain its omission from the Rudge Cup and Amiens Skillet. It is thought that Rigorevali Aeli means On the line of Hadrian's Wall, as Aelius is the family name of Hadrian. Draconis probably refers to either the manufacturer or the person for whom the bowl was made, Draco.

=== Berlanga Cup ===
The Berlanga Cup is a model (too small to be functional) bronze trulla found in Berlanga de Duero, in Spain, in 2025. Bearing the same kind of coloured enamel decoration as the Rudge Cup, it also lists four forts, but is unique among known examples of this kind of memento in referring to forts at the eastern end of the Wall: Cilurnum (Chesters), Onnum (Halton Chesters), Vindobala (Rudchester) and Condercum (Benwell).

== Bibliography ==
- Breeze, David J., ed. (2012). The first souvenirs : enamelled vessels from Hadrian's Wall. CWAAS extra series, no.37. [Carlisle]: Cumberland and Westmorland Antiquarian and Archaeological Society. pp. 1–136. ISBN 978-1-873124-58-1.
