= William Sprigg =

William Sprigg may refer to:

- William Sprigg (judge) (1770–1827), American judge in Ohio, the Orleans Territory and the Illinois Territory
- William Sprigg (pamphleteer), 17th-century English pamphleteer

== See also ==
- William Sprigge (1678–1735), Irish politician
- William Spriggs (1955–2023), American economist, Assistant Secretary of Labor for Policy
