= Petriana =

Roman fort in Cumbria, England

Uxelodunum
- Stanwix Fort; Petriana
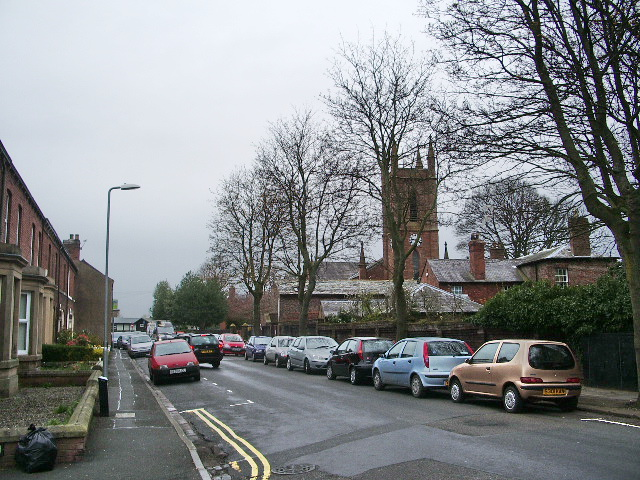
- Church Street, Stanwix. The fort was in the area around St Michael's church

- Location within Cumbria
- 54.905°N 2.942°W
- Location: Cumbria, England

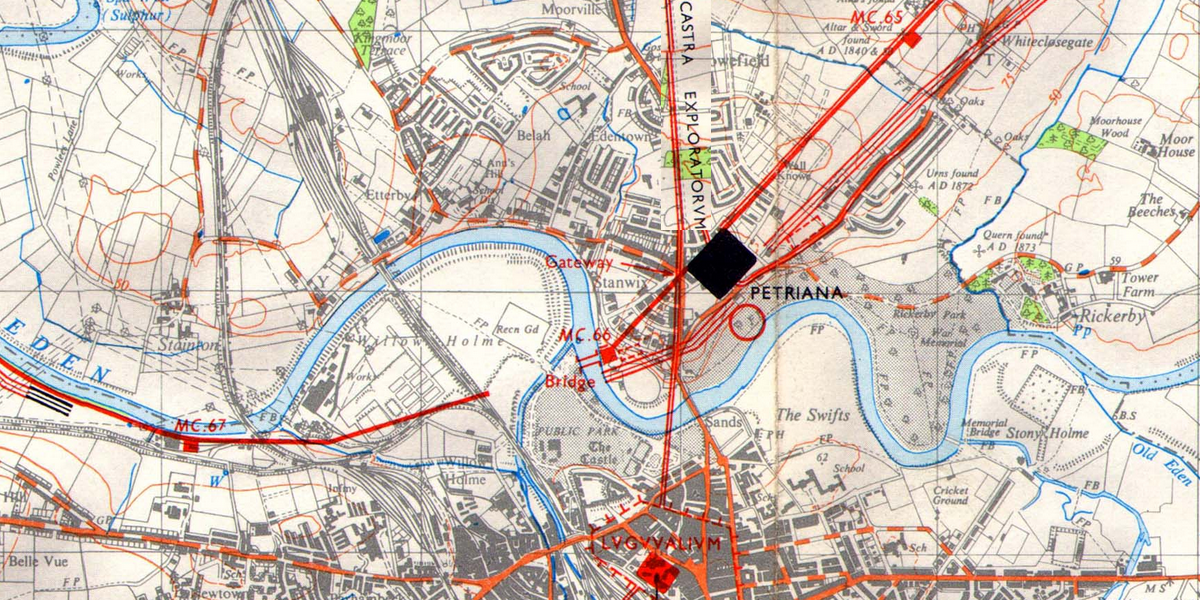
Uxelodunum fort, Hadrian's Wall with milecastles, and Luguvalium on 1964 OS map

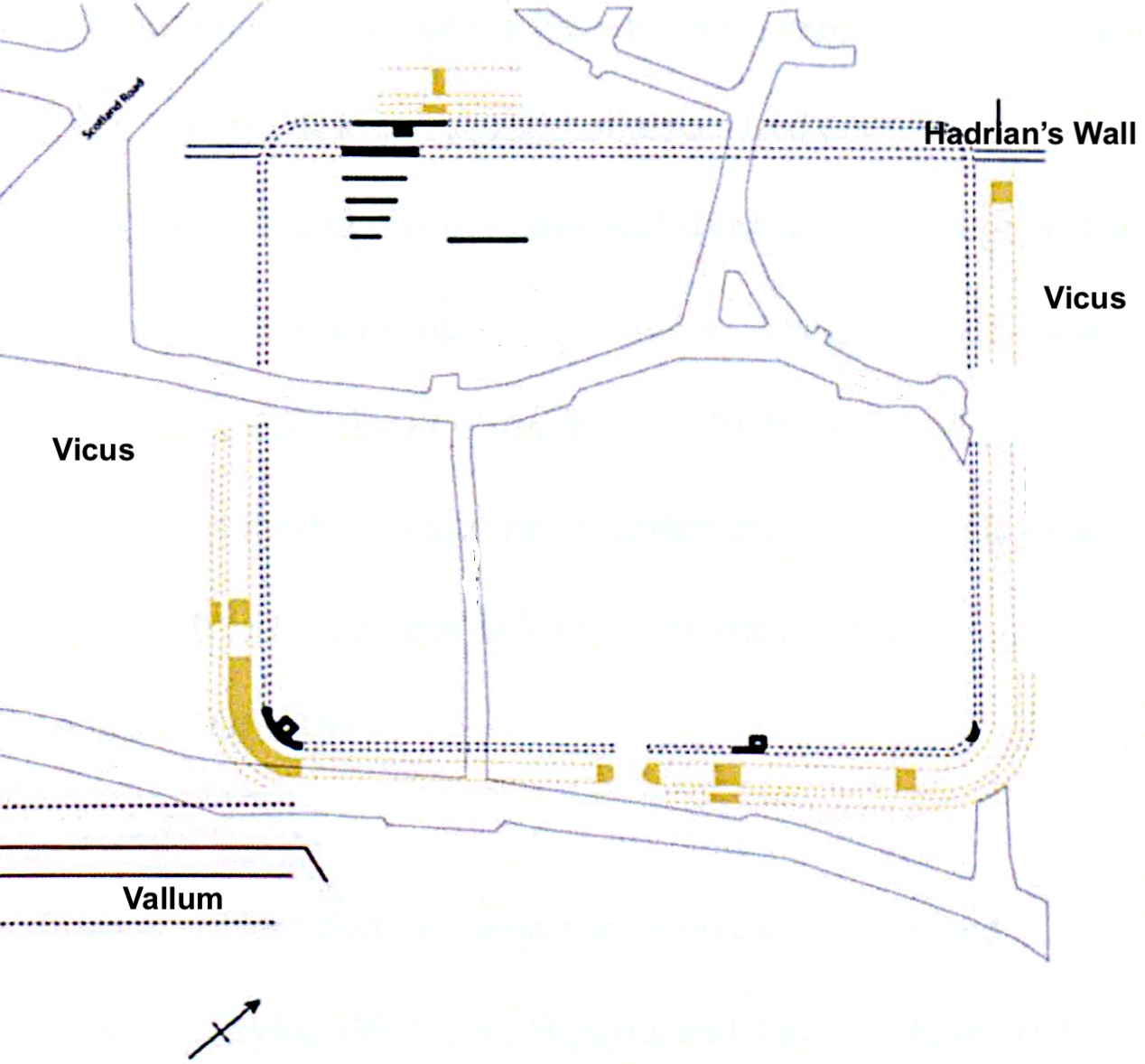
Uxelodunum plan

Uxelodunum (with the alternative Roman name of Petriana and the modern name of Stanwix Fort) was a Roman fort with associated civilian settlement (vicus) in modern-day Carlisle, Cumbria, England. It was the largest fort on Hadrian's Wall and is now buried beneath the suburb of Stanwix.

== Roman name ==
The fort was called Petrianis in the Notitia Dignitatum, but on the Ravenna Cosmography it is called Uxellodamo. On the Rudge Cup it is spelled VXELODVM. On the Amiens Skillet it is spelled VXELODVNVM. It is also spelled VXELODVNVM on the Staffordshire Moorlands Pan. The name Petrianis comes from the cohort that was stationed there, which appears to be a latinisation of a Celtic toponym thought to mean High Fort.

It is thus likely that the name Petriana was a scribal error which confused the fort's name and the occupying unit, and that the fort's true name was Uxelodunum.

== History ==
In 122 the province was visited by Hadrian who started the building of the wall along the frontier slightly to the north of the Stanegate, the previous frontier. Uxelodunum fort was therefore built on the wall north of the river and within sight of the Luguvallum fort, as a small turf-and-timber fort with its northern rampart consisting of the original Turf Wall and its long axis parallel to the Wall. The Wall's vallum ditches behind the wall were placed close enough to leave sufficient space for the ramparts of this fort. The fort was later rebuilt in stone when the Wall was rebuilt likewise. Milecastle 65 was also built on the wall about 1 km northwest of the fort.

The fort was later considerably expanded to the north and west to accommodate the larger Ala Gallorum Petriana, the nominally 1,000-strong cavalry regiment, the sole cavalry regiment of this size in Britain, after the internal buildings had been demolished as well as the south-western and northern rampart walls. In extending north beyond the Wall, as required by a cavalry fort, the fort was pushed to the edge of the escarpment and it may also have extended to the south to the limit of the Vallum.

It was abandoned like the rest of the wall in about 138 before the Antonine Wall was built, but was rebuilt in stone in about 165 when Hadrian's Wall was reinstated as the frontier and locally also rebuilt in stone.

== Description ==
The fort is about 9 miles from Castlesteads (Camboglanna) and 6 miles east of Burgh by Sands (Aballava), the nearest forts on Hadrian's Wall. It stands on a natural platform above the River Eden and was intended to guard the Eden bridgehead and watch the important western route to Scotland.

The fort measured about 177 m north to south by 213 m east to west, covering approximately 9.32 acres (3.77 ha), much larger than the other wall forts. The later fort layout extended north beyond the Wall to allow the garrison to exit northwards through 3 wide gates. North of the wall the rampart was fronted by three ditches.

Most of the fort lies beneath Saint Michael’s churchyard, where traces of the fort’s south-eastern rampart remain as a low, spread bank, at best 0.3m high. Some masonry is displayed in the car park of the Cumbria Park hotel.

Some nearby remains have been discovered including a bathhouse discovered in 2017 and the parade ground thought to be east of the site on an extensive clay platform of about 7.5 acres.

== Garrison ==
Because of the large size of the fort, it is thought to have housed a cavalry regiment, nominally one thousand strong. This was almost certainly the Ala Petriana, the sole regiment of this size on the Wall where it is placed by the Notitia dignitatum. This was a distinguished auxiliary regiment, whose soldiers had been made Roman citizens for valour on the field of battle. It seems that the fort was given the name of its garrison, thus supplanting the earlier name of Uxelodunum.

== Vicus ==
Traces of a civil settlement outside the walls are surprisingly slight given the large size of the fort, but the Roman town of Carlisle was probably near enough to serve in place of a vicus. Archaeological evidence includes masonry and pottery in the churchyard and material on Stanwix bank, second-century occupation found in 1931 outside the west rampart, and a mid 2nd-century bronzesmith's workshop discovered in 1930 below the fort with both military and civilian products.

Signs of buildings were visible in the 18th century south-east of the fort on the slope towards the river.

== Excavations ==
Excavations in 1932–4 traced the ditch for the south rampart as well as Hadrian's Wall, which formed the north face of the fort. Barrack-like buildings were also found within the outline of the fort. In 1939 a large granary, lying east to west, was found in extending the local school-yard. In 1940 the south-west angle tower was found as well as the south and east walls.

In 1934 various objects were found which appeared to have been washed down into the river from the fort. These included brooches, mountings for cavalrymen's uniforms and harness.

In 1939-40 the line of the walls was established and an angle tower and interval tower were located.

Excavations in 1984 uncovered a 24 m length of the base of the north-western rampart in the car park behind the Cumbria Park Hotel in Stanwix which are on public display.

=== Baths ===
In 2017 a major discovery was made of a bath-house on the riverside beneath the grounds of Carlisle Cricket Club (Edenside cricket ground). The well-preserved remains include a hypocaust for heating. Also found was an inscription to Julia Domna, the wife of the Emperor Septimius Severus, whom she accompanied in Britain from 208 until his death in 211 at York. The inscription prompts the question, whether Julia Domna and her husband visited Petriana.

In summer 2021, a community archaeological dig took place on the site. A group of tiles were found with the imperial stamp of Septimius Severus. Later finds included a group of about 30 semi-precious gems, some carved as intaglia, which were found in a drain and are thought to have been lost by bathers. The "Uncovering Roman Carlisle" project, including the Cricket Club dig, won the Council for British Archaeology and Marsh Community Trust's Community Archaeology Project of the Year 2022 award. The dig continued in 2023, and in May 2023 two large stone heads were found.
