= New College, Durham (17th century) =

Proposed university in Durham

Durham College
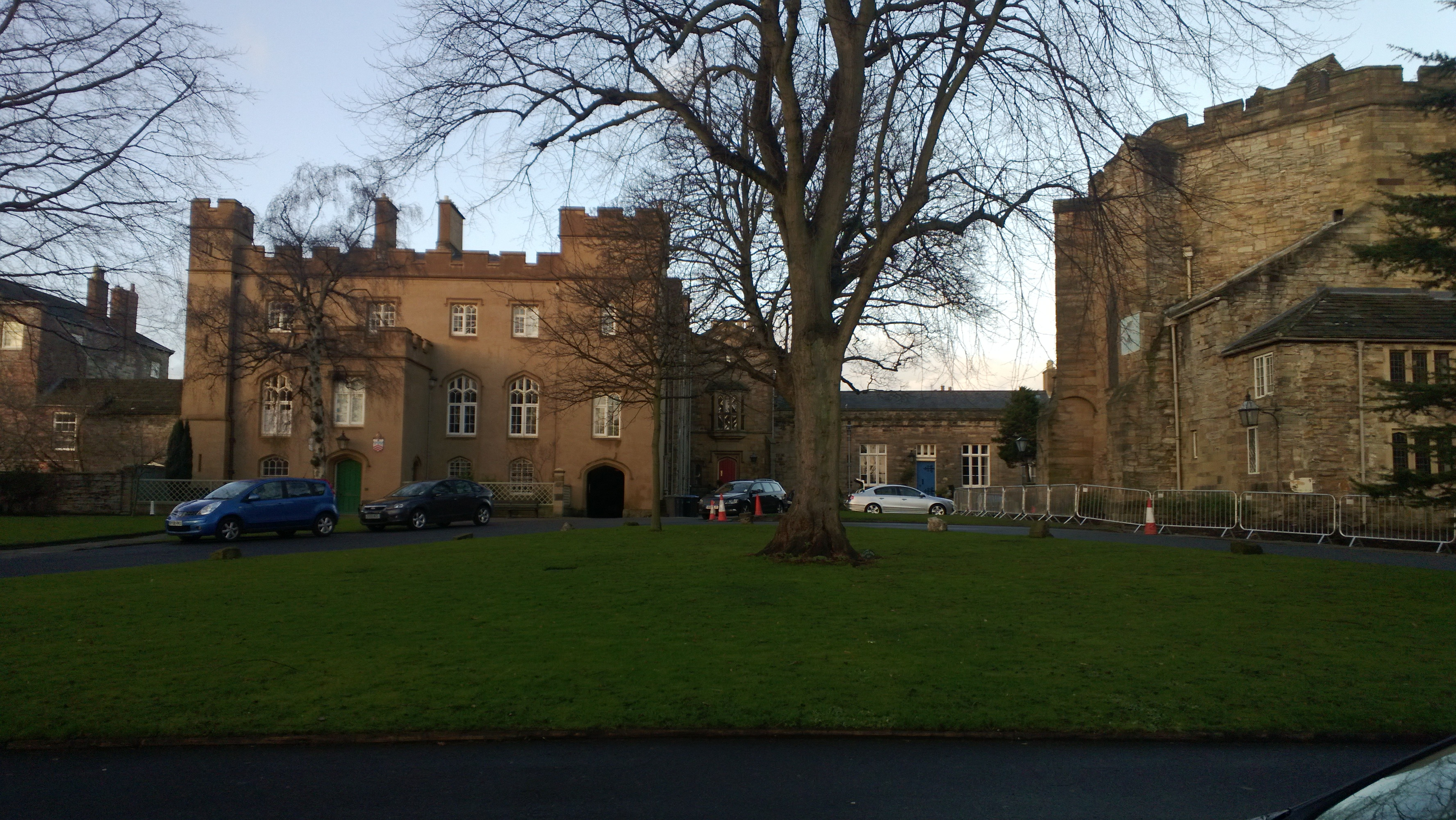
- The College (cathedral close), given to Durham College as its home
- Active: 1653–1660
- Founder: Oliver Cromwell
- Location: Durham, County Durham, England; 54.772314°N 1.576700°W
- Campus: University town

New College, Durham, or Durham College, was a university institution set up by Oliver Cromwell, to provide an alternative to (and break the effective monopoly of) the older University of Oxford and University of Cambridge. It also had the aim of bringing university education to Northern England.

It was formed in 1653, receiving its letters patent – though not degree-awarding powers – in 1657, but after Cromwell's death in 1659 the universities of Oxford and Cambridge petitioned his son Richard Cromwell against the new university, and the college ceased to exist with the restoration of the monarchy in 1660.

== On paper ==
Such a project had been discussed at least since the 1640s. In 1641 a petition had asked for a university in Manchester or York. Later a scheme was promoted by Samuel Hartlib amongst others. Cromwell himself was particularly interested in a new university at Durham which he viewed as important in order to help with the propagation of the gospel in those 'dark places' of the North. The statutes drawn up in 1656 were worked over by Ralph Cudworth, John Crew (later 1st Baron Crew), Sir William Ellis and others appointed from March 1655, and Sir Charles Wolseley and George Griffith in 1656.

The idea met with opponents, including University of Oxford vice-chancellor John Conant.

== The institution ==
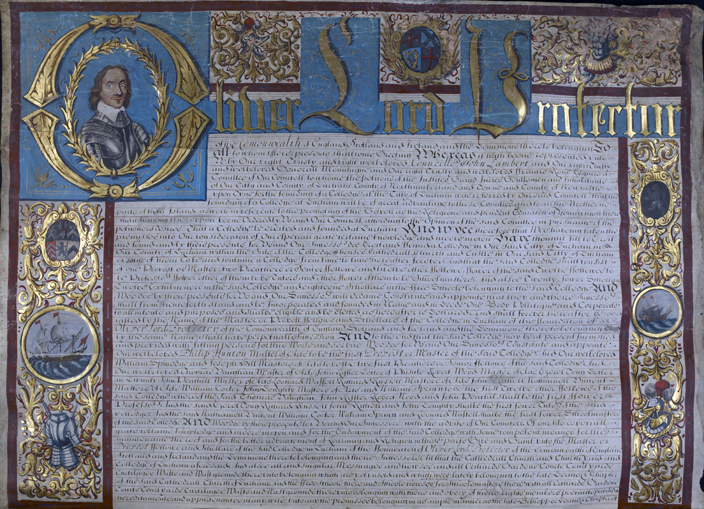
Letters issued by Oliver Cromwell on May 15th 1657 authorising a college in Durham

The college had an effective life of 1653 to 1659, and was officially dissolved in 1660. The Chapter of Durham Cathedral had been dissolved in April 1649, leaving the cathedral, the cathedral close, and the former Bishop's palace of Durham Castle vacant and available for the new institution. Cromwell signed letters patent setting it up formally in May 1657;, which incorporated the college as "the Provost, Fellows and Scholars of the College in Durham of the Foundation of Oliver, Lord Protector", and around this time Paul Hobson was the visitor.

The personnel included Philip Hunton appointed in 1657 as Master or Provost, and Israel Tonge as Fellow. The initial establishment was the Provost, two Senior Fellows, two Junior Fellows, and some other junior positions. Richard Gilpin was appointed the Visitor. Joseph Hill was an active supporter, and sought money to bring Hungarian students to Durham. Tonge looked to recruit both Hill and John Peachell. Hill's pupil William Pell was appointed a tutor in 1656. Georg Ritschel, then teaching in Newcastle, who was a Comenian reformer in contact with the Hartlib Circle, may have acted as a tutor in 1657.

The letters patent had mentioned besides Hunton and Hill as a Senior Fellow or Preacher:

- William Spinedge (Spinage) of Exeter College, Oxford as Preacher;
- as Professors Thomas Vaughan, John Kiffler (Anglicised name of Johannes Sibertus Kuffler, who declined), Robert Wood of Lincoln College, Oxford, and Peachell;
- as Tutors Tonge, Richard Russell, John Richell and John Doughty;
- as Schoolmasters Nathaniel Vincent of Corpus Christi College, Oxford, William Corker of Trinity College, Cambridge, William Sprigg of Lincoln College, Oxford, and Leonard Wastell, Rector of Hurworth-on-Tees.

The College never scaled up to these intentions.

== Dissolution ==
A further petition was made to Cromwell in 1658 for degree-awarding powers, but nothing was done before he died in September 1658, and was succeeded by his son, Richard Cromwell.

In 1659 the universities of Oxford and Cambridge petitioned Richard Cromwell against the foundation of a third university, and especially against any grant of degree-awarding powers. The college was also opposed by George Fox and other Quakers as being an institute designed to prepare ministers. According to Fowler, "on April 22 [Richard Cromwell] directed that a grant which had been drawn up to make the College a University should not be sealed until further order".

The restoration of the monarchy in 1660 saw the cathedral chapter re-established and Durham College closed. However, the cause of education was not wholly forgotten, for Bishop John Cosin established his library on Palace Green a few years later, in 1669.

== Legacy ==
In the 1950s it was suggested that a college at Durham University might be named after Cromwell, in honour of his role as (according to Christopher Hill) 'the man who created a University in Durham three hundred years earlier'. However this suggestion was met by 'astonishingly fierce opposition', and the name Grey College was instead chosen by a single vote.
