= Cives Mundi =

Spanish non-governmental organization

- Founded: 1987
- Type: Non-profit; Non-governmental organization
- Location: Soria, Spain, Europe
- Region served: Latin America, Caribbean, Maghreb, Sub-Saharan Africa and Asia
- Fields: development cooperation, environmental protection and AIDS prevention.
- Website: www.civesmundi.es

Cives Mundi is a non-governmental organization. It was founded in 1987 in Soria, Spain. Cives Mundi is currently developing its projects for cooperation in Latin America, Caribbean, Maghreb, Sub-Saharan Africa and Asia.

== History ==
Cives Mundi was founded on November 11, 1987, as a cultural association aiming at making exchanges with Eastern countries in Europe. Cooperation activities were not carried out until ten years later.

In 1998 the first cooperation project for Cives Mundi as a non-governmental organization was identified. A plan for the full development of the Cochabamba Peruvian region. Cochabamba was one of the least favoured regions of the Andean country and suffered from a serious problem of children malnutrition and illiteracy.

In 2005 Cives Mundi started to work in the Dominican Republic, TunisiaAlgeria, Morocco, Mauritania, Kenya, Tanzania, Philippines, Cambodia and Bangladesh.

== Areas of activity ==
=== Maghreb ===
Since 2005, Cives Mundi has worked in Morocco, Tunisia, Algeria and Mauritania within the Collective Network for the Sustainable Development of Oasis (RADDO, for its French acronym) in restoring several oasis in the countries and, thus, fighting against desertification. One general objective of Cives Mundi is to diminish the consequences of environmental degradation in rural areas where poverty areas exist by promoting sustainable farming techniques, improving the management of water resources and establishing renewable energies. Other main objective is to develop activities to raise public awareness, instruct and deal with gender issues in order to consolidate and, whenever possible, create a civil society.

=== Lebanon ===
In Lebanon Cives Mundi works in the Ain al-Hilweh refugee camp of Palestinian refugees. This camp is situated at the south of Beirut, near the city of Saida. The project offers professional training courses to youngsters and teenagers.

=== Sub-Saharan Africa ===
Cives Mundi carried out the project Life&Living related to the prevention and fight against AIDS in Kenya and Tanzania. More than 900,000 people benefited from the project. In Tanzania, it funded the construction of the 'Emiliano Aguirre' scientific station for research, in the Oldupai archaeological site, known as the "Cradle of Mankind". The scientific station will be used by the Spanish archaeologists in their annual campaigns. The rest of the year, the station will be included in the promotion of the cultural turism of the well-known area of Ngorongoro.

=== The Caribbean ===
In the Dominican Republic and Haiti, AIDS prevention has been one of Cives Mundi's main priorities. A project to optimize coffee harvest was also carried out in Loma de Panzo, in the Dominican Republic. After the 2010 Haiti earthquake, Cives Mundi implemented two projects to help rebuilding the country by reactivating the local economy through craftmanship in the town of Jacmel.

=== Latin America ===
Besides Peru, Cives Mundi carries out projects for cooperation in other countries with different indigenous ethnics. Thus, the Guaraní Indians benefit from the projects in Argentina and Paraguay. The Wiwa people are the beneficiaries in Colombia, and the Quechua people in Ecuador. Besides, Cives Mundi promoted the twinning between the Santa Cruz Island (Galápagos) island in Ecuador, and the Berlanga de Duero village in the Spanish town of Soria. Berlanga de Duero is the birthplace of Fray Tomás de Berlanga, discoverer of the archipelago.

=== Asia ===
In Asia Cives Mundi works in Cambodia and in Bangladesh. In Cambodia, Cives Mundi works with the forestry communities in the north of the country. In Bangladesh, it works in a project to improve the life conditions of the physically handicapped.

== Other activities ==
=== Raising public awareness ===
==== Film Festivals ====
Cives Mundi has established three film festivals to raise public awareness on different issues. The Sinima Festival (Arabic language films) dealt with the situation in the Middle East and the Maghreb. The Tribal Festival approached the problems of native people in several continents from the point of view of different film directors. Those problems included the great variety of ethnics existing between the Southern cone of South America and the Indians in the United States, the Sami village in northern Europe], and the Australian aborigines. This Festival aimed at emphasizing the vulnerable situation of these groups as a consequence of the discrimination and neglect of the government and the media. These are the reasons why these groups have not been able to put into practise their own forms of development and ways of life.

==== Symposiums, seminars, congresses and round tables ====
In 2006, the Cives Mundi organized a seminar entitled Lo que la Sociedad Civil y ONG deben saber y pueden hacer (What the Civil Society and the NGO Must Know and Can Do). During this seminar its influence on corporate social responsibility was analyzed. Furthermore, the Cives Mundi participates in countless round tables in universities aiming at achieving an approach from students to the reality of inequality and poverty in the world.

==== Expositions ====
Cives Mundi, along with the African Medical and Research Foundation (AMREF), started an itinerant exposition of the project Life&Living by the end of 2008. This exposition included a sample of different images and materials related to actions implemented in Kenya and Tanzania on the prevention of AIDS contagion. These two countries have some of the highest HIV - AIDS indicators in the world and are among the countries with extreme poverty.

=== Culture ===
In 2007, Cives Mundi was in charge of scheduling and coordinating all the events celebrated in the centenary of the arrival of Antonio Machado to Soria. Besides, the organization has implemented different cultural audiovisual festivals. An example of the later is the festival organized in 2010 to honour Lorenzo Soler. The films screened during this festival were Apuntes para una odisea soriana interpretada por negros (Notes for an odyssey in Soria interpreted by black people), El viaje inverso (The inverted trip) o Historias de España (Stories of Spain). All the films were shot in the province of Soria.

Cives Mundi also produced its own cultural material. In 2002 it published the book Crónica de Cochabamba (The Cochabamba Chronicles) by the journalist José Luis Bravo. The book is a reflection of the life of the inhabitants in Cochabamba, and is focused on the actions developed in the Peruvian region.

=== Fair Trade ===
Cives Mundi launched a fair trade initiative in 2006 entitled Sechura. This initiative sold ceramic pieces of Peruvian origin named chulucanas, an ornamental pottery designed with black and white geometric figures. The ceramic pieces were made by the Vicús ethnic in the Sechura desert, in the north of Peru.
