= William Pell (minister) =

William Pell (1634–1698) was an English nonconformist minister, ejected in 1662, a tutor of Durham College subsequently imprisoned for illegal preaching.

== Life ==
The son of William Pell, he was born at Sheffield in 1634. After passing through the grammar school at Rotherham, Yorkshire, he was admitted as sizar at the age of seventeen on 29 March 1651 to Magdalene College, Cambridge. There his tutor was Joseph Hill. He graduated M.A., was elected scholar 2 June 1654 and fellow 3 November 1656.

He received orders from Ralph Brownrig, bishop of Exeter, probably at Sunning, Berkshire. He held the sequestered rectory of Easington, County Durham, and a tutorship in the college at Durham recently founded by Oliver Cromwell. At the Restoration Durham College collapsed, and Clark, the sequestered rector of Easington, was restored. Pell was appointed to the rectory of Great Stainton, Durham, which he held until ejected in 1662.

After ejection he preached in conventicles, and was imprisoned at Durham for nonconformity. Taken to London by habeas corpus, he was discharged by Sir Matthew Hale. He then went to the North Riding of Yorkshire, and practised medicine.

He had a reputation as an orientalist, though he published nothing, leaving unfinished collections including rabbinical studies. Friends asked him to resume the work of teaching at university level. He considered himself constrained: by the terms of his graduation oath, as he understood it, he should not lecture outside the ancient universities. The project of instituting a new ‘northern academy’ passed into the hands of Richard Frankland, who founded in Rathmell Academy one of the first dissenting academies.

After the indulgence of 1672 he preached in public at Tattershall, Lincolnshire, and was protected by holding the office of domestic steward to Edward Clinton, 5th Earl of Lincoln. A London merchant of the same surname, but not a kinsman, became his benefactor. On James II's declaration for liberty of conscience (1687), he became pastor to the nonconformists at Boston, Lincolnshire.

He moved in 1694 to become the assistant of Richard Gilpin, at Newcastle-upon-Tyne. Here he died on 2 December 1698, in his sixty-third year. He was buried on 6 December at St. Nicholas's Church, Newcastle. He married Elizabeth (buried 30 January 1708), daughter of George Lilburn of Sunderland.
