= Richard Gilpin =

English minister and doctor (1625–1700)

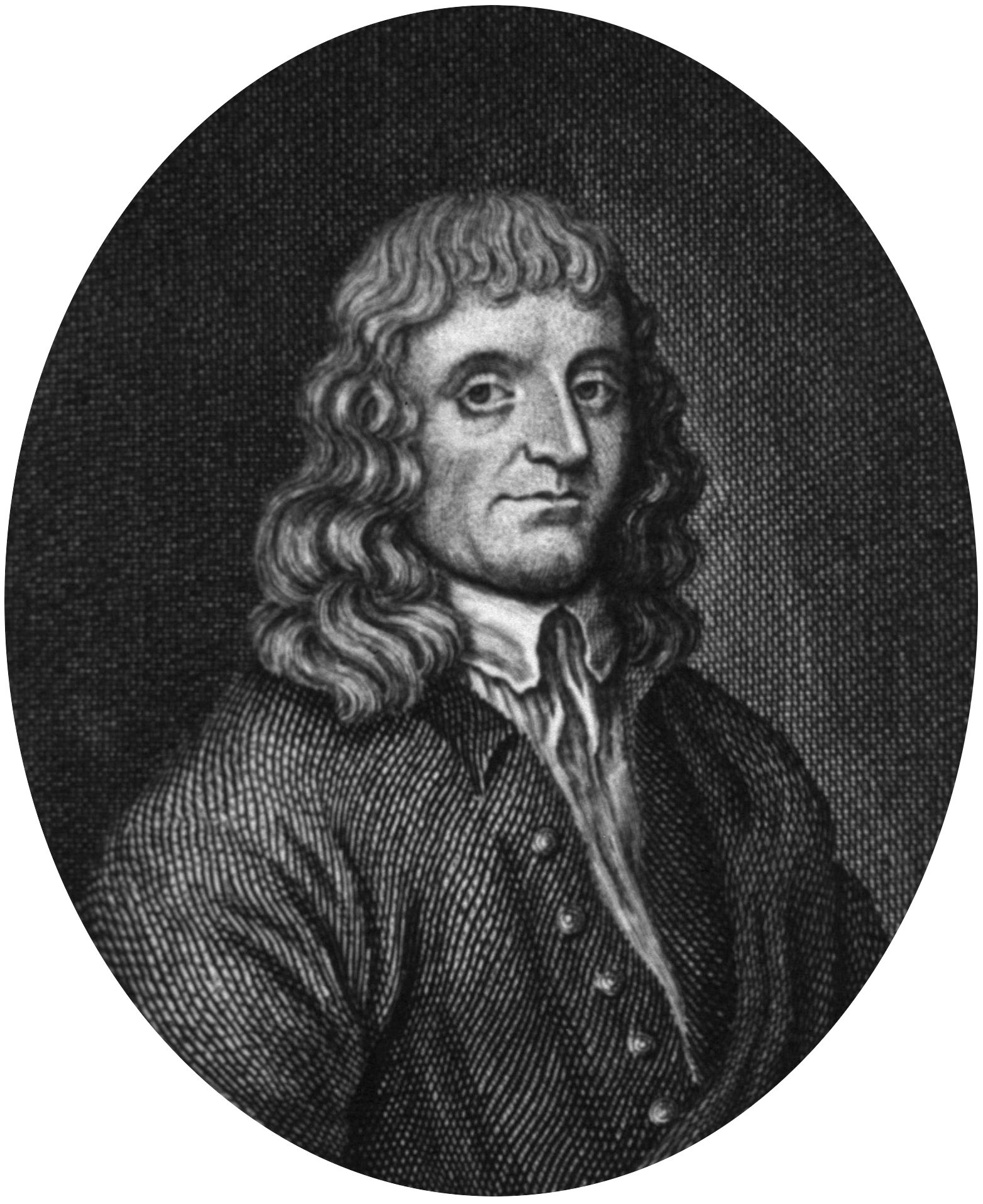
- Born: Strickland, England
- Baptised: 23 October 1625
- Died: 13 February 1700
- Education: University of Edinburgh
- Father: Isaac Gilpin

Richard Gilpin (baptised 23 October 1625 – 13 February 1700) was an English nonconformist minister and physician, prominent in the northern region.

== Life ==
The second son of Isaac Gilpin of Strickland Ketel, in the parish of Kendal, Westmorland, and Ann, daughter of Ralph Tonstall of Coatham-Mundeville, County Durham, he was born at Strickland, and baptised at Kendal on 23 October 1625. He was educated at the University of Edinburgh, graduating with an MA on 30 July 1646, and studying first medicine, then divinity. Neither the date nor the manner of his ordination is known.

He began his ministry at Lambeth, continued it at the Savoy as assistant to John Wilkins, and then returning to the north preached at Durham. In 1650 William Morland had been sequestered from the rectory of Greystoke, Cumberland. For about two years the living had been held by one West, a popular preacher, who died of consumption. Gilpin succeeded him in 1652 or early in 1653. In the parish of Greystoke there were four chapels, which Gilpin supplied with preachers. His parish was organised on the congregational model, having an inner circle of communicants and a staff of deacons; the presbyterian system had not been adopted in Cumberland. In August 1653 Gilpin set on foot a voluntary association of the churches of Cumberland and Westmorland, on the lines of Richard Baxter's Worcestershire 'agreement' of that year, but giving to the associated clergy somewhat larger powers. The organisation worked smoothly and gained in adherents; the terms of agreement were printed in 1656; in 1658 Gilpin preached (19 May) before the associated ministers at Keswick. His chief trouble was with the Quakers, who abounded in his district; one of his relatives at Kendal had been for a short time a Quaker.

Gilpin was in the habit of giving medical advice as well as spiritual counsel to his flock. By his purchase of the manor of Scaleby Castle, some twenty miles north of Greystoke, beyond Carlisle, he acquired a public position in the county. He was appointed Visitor to Durham College, for which Oliver Cromwell issued a patent on 15 May 1657.

At the Restoration, Gilpin was one of the most prominent religious leaders in the north of England, and was offered the see of Carlisle, which he refused. He preached at Carlisle at the opening of the assize on 10 September 1660. When Richard Sterne became bishop (2 December), Gilpin was not called upon to vacate his living, but resigned it on 2 February 1661 in favour of the sequestered Morland, retired to Scaleby, and preached there in his large hall. He is also said to have preached occasionally at Penruddock, a village in Greystoke parish, where John Noble, one of his deacons, gathered in his own house a nonconformist congregation, afterwards ministered to by Anthony Sleigh (died 1702). Shortly after the passing of the Act of Uniformity 1662 Gilpin moved to Newcastle upon Tyne, to minister to the hearers of the ejected lecturer, Samuel Hammond. By 1663 John Cosin was complaining of him. He did not wait for the indulgence of 1672, but openly disregarded the Conventicle Acts (1664, 1670) and the Five Mile Act (1665). He was several times fined for holding a conventicle, but does not seem to have been interfered with after 4 August 1669.

At Newcastle, he acquired a good practice as a physician, and graduated M.D. at Leiden University on 6 July 1676. He was an effective preacher and drew a diverse congregation. From 1694 to 1698 Gilpin had as assistant William Pell, ejected from Great Stainton, Durham. Pell was followed by Timothy Manlove (died 3 August 1699), and Manlove by Thomas Bradbury. After Bradbury was Benjamin Bennet. Gilpin died on 13 February 1700.

== Works ==
He published:

- 'The Agreement of the Associated Ministers and Churches of Cumberland and Westmerland' (sic), &c., 1646, (anon.).
- 'The Temple Rebuilt,' &c., 1658, (sermon, Zach. vi. 13, to associated ministers).
- 'Disputatio Medica Inauguralis de Hysterica Passione,' &c., 1676.
- 'Dæmonologia Sacra; or, a Treatise of Satan's Temptations,' &c., 3 pts., 1677; 2nd edit. Edinburgh, 1735; new edition, by A. B. Grosart, Edinburgh, 1867, (a work of religious experience, the first title somewhat misleading).
- 'The Comforts of Divine Love,' &c., 1700 (funeral sermon for Manlove). Posthumous was
- 'An Assize Sermon … at Carlisle,' &c., London and Newcastle, 1700 (preached in 1660, see above).

Among Gilpin's manuscripts was a treatise on the 'Pleasantness of the Ways of Religion,' which Calamy desired to see in print; it has since been lost.

== Family ==
He was twice married; his second wife, who survived him, was Susanna, daughter of William Brisco of Crofton, Yorkshire. She moved to Scaleby Castle, and died on 18 January 1715. His children were:

1. William, born 5 September 1657, remained a churchman, became recorder of Carlisle (1718), was noted for artistic and antiquarian tastes, married Mary, daughter of Henry Fletcher of Tallantire, Cumberland, and was buried 14 December 1724. William's daughter, Susanna Appleby, was also an antiquarian and excavated a Roman bath house near Camboglanna in 1741.
2. Isaac, born 12 July 1658, died 21 February 1719.
3. Susanna, born 17 October 1659, married Matthias Partis.
4. Anne, born 5 December 1660, married Jeremiah Sawrey of Broughton Tower, Lancashire; buried 11 April 1745.
5. Elizabeth, born 3 August 1662.
6. Richard, born 4 May 1664, died young.
7. Mary, born 28 December 1666.
8. Dorothy, born 13 August 1668, married, first, Jabez Cay, M.D., of Newcastle upon Tyne; secondly, on 29 December 1704, Eli Fenton; died April 1708.
9. John, born 13 February 1670, merchant at Whitehaven, made a fortune in the Virginia trade; married Hannah, daughter of Robert Cay of Newcastle upon Tyne; buried 26 November 1732.
10. Frances, born 27 July 1671, died young.
11. Bernard, born 6 October 1672, died young in Jamaica.
12. Frances, born 27 January 1675, died young.
13. Thomas, born 27 July 1677, died 20 June 1700.

== Notes ==
- This article incorporates text from a publication now in the public domain: "Gilpin, Richard". Dictionary of National Biography. London: Smith, Elder & Co. 1885–1900.
