= Berlanga Cup =

Bronze cup found in Berlanga, Spain

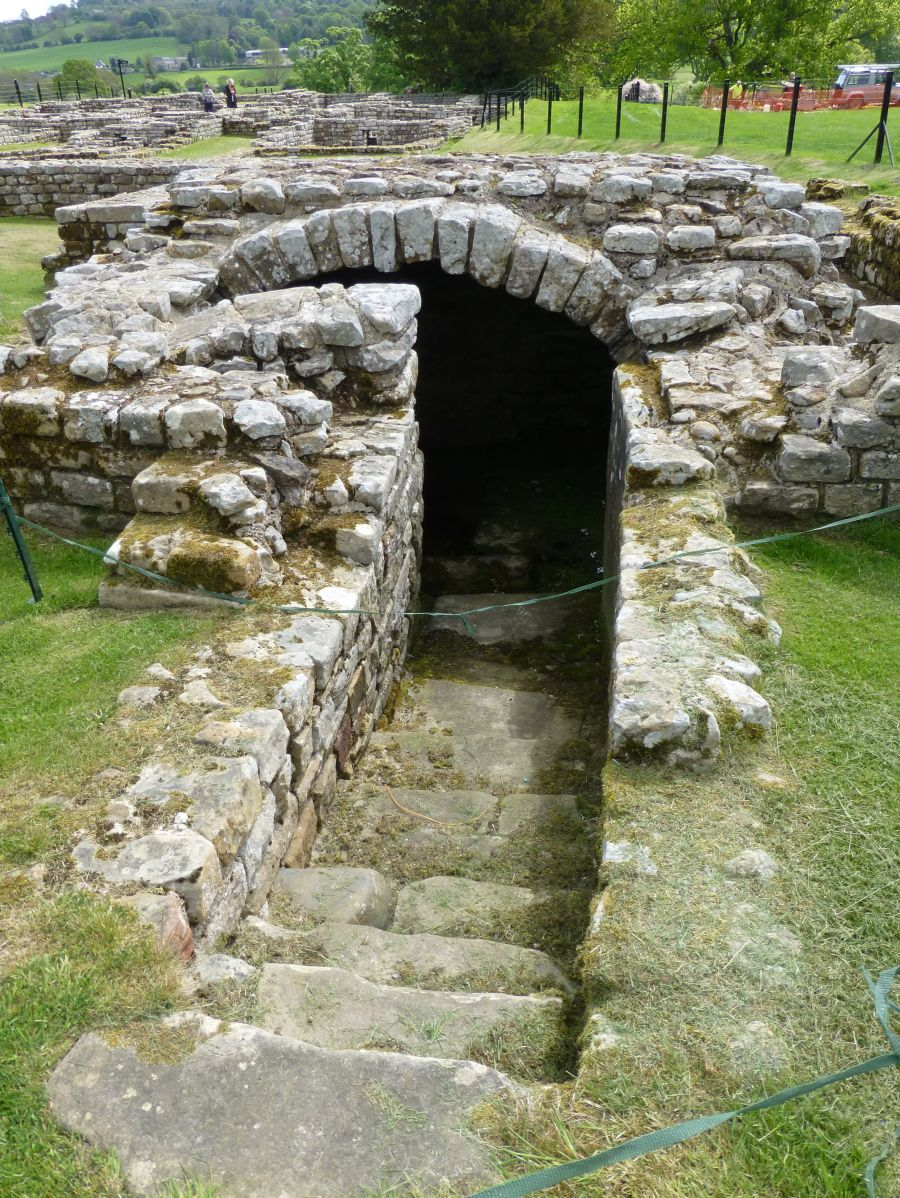
The ruins of the treasury at Cilurnum, one of the four forts named on the Berlanga Cup.

The Berlanga cup is a 2nd-century AD enamelled model trulla (cup or serving-pan) made of a zinc-lead-bronze alloy and inscribed with the names of four of the forts on Hadrian's Wall. It is decorated with coloured vitreous enamel and square designs, possibly representing the Wall or the forts in some way. It was discovered in 2025 at Berlanga de Duero, in Castile and León and is now held at the Museo Numantino in Soria.

== Description ==
The cup was found in four pieces, together representing 80-90% of the original item. Reconstructed, it would have been a small hemispherical bowl, evidently without a handle. The outside bears "enamel decoration in various colours, which can be divided into two clearly differentiated parts: in the upper section, a Latin inscription runs around the rim of the cup, occupying only a small space, and in the lower part, there is a large decorative space with three horizontal friezes."

It is a "small representation" of a drinking cup rather than a full-size functional item, suggesting it was a souvenir or perhaps a prize for valour.

The inscription reads:

[…]RNVMONNOV[…]DOBALACONDERCOM

interpreted as [CILV]RNUM ONNO V[IN]DOBALA CONDERCOM, corresponding to the forts of Cilurnum (Chesters), Onnum (Halton Chesters), Vindobala (Rudchester) and Condercum (Benwell).

It is one of a group of cups and dishes with similar decoration and lists of placenames, including the Rudge Cup, the Staffordshire Moorlands Pan, the Amiens patera, and the Hildburgh fragment. It is so far the only such find that names forts on the eastern part of the Wall.

== Origin ==
Isotope analysis of the lead used in the cup showed that it was most likely mined in northern England or in Wales, suggesting the cup was made in Britain and placing its origin more than 1000 miles from where it was found. Spanish auxiliaries are known to have served at several forts on the Wall: it is possible, though not known for certain, that the cup might have belonged to a Spanish soldier who took it home when he retired.
