= Susanna Appleby =

British antiquarian (1689–1769)

Susanna Maria Appleby
- Born: Susanna Maria Gilpin; 1689; Scaleby Castle, Cumberland, England
- Died: 1769 (aged 79–80)
- Spouse: Joseph Dacre Appleby
- Parents: William Gilpin; Mary Gilpin
- Relatives: Richard Gilpin (grandfather)

Susanna Maria Appleby (born Gilpin; 1689–1769) was a British antiquarian who is principally known for excavating a Roman bath house north east of Camboglanna, Castlesteads Roman Fort, near Hadrian's Wall in 1741.

== Life ==
Appleby was born in 1689, as Susanna Maria Gilpin, the daughter of William Gilpin (1657–1724) at Scaleby Castle, Cumberland. Her grandfather was Richard Gilpin, a prominent nonconformist minister and physician while her father was a minister who became Recorder of Carlisle in 1718. Appleby's mother was Mary, daughter of Henry Fletcher of Tallantire, Cumberland. Appleby married Joseph Dacre Appleby and had eight children, three of her sons died young. They lived at Kirklevington Hall (now known as Kirklinton Hall) in Kirklinton. Appleby died in 1769.

== Excavations ==
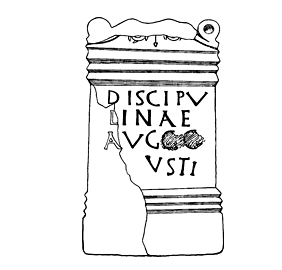
The altar discovered in ca. 1791 (RIB 1978)

Joseph Dacre Appleby owned the land on which Camboglanna was situated, and employed men to dig at the site for stone. After his death, in 1741, Susanna Appleby excavated a Roman bath house, in woodland north east of Camboglanna (Castlesteads Roman Fort). In William Hutchinson's 1794 volume on the history of the county of Cumberland, he publishes a letter written by the antiquarian Roger Gale with Appleby's description of the site. The bath house was discovered in woodland to the north east of the fort, where remains of the hypocaust system and paved flooring could still be seen in rooms of the bath house. An altar from the site was removed and carried to Appleby's house in 1741. In the same year, the antiquarian George Smith (1700–1773) visited the site and drew a plan of the site and inscriptions, later published in The Gentleman's Magazine. In his letters to The Gentleman's Magazine, Smith described how Appleby had found a clay flooring with pedestals, and commented that:

Mrs Appleby, who deserves to be gratefully remember'd by all Lovers of Antiquity, took great Pains to preserve what she cou'd of those valuable Remains of the Antients.

Appleby's early work and observations at the site of Camboglanna in the 1740s are significant due to the later destruction of the fort during the construction of Castlesteads house and gardens in 1791. Eric Birley, in his 1961 work on Hadrian's Wall, described Appleby as "the earliest female antiquary of whom we have a record in the Wall region."
