= Staffordshire Moorlands Pan =

Patera or handled pan from the 2nd century AD

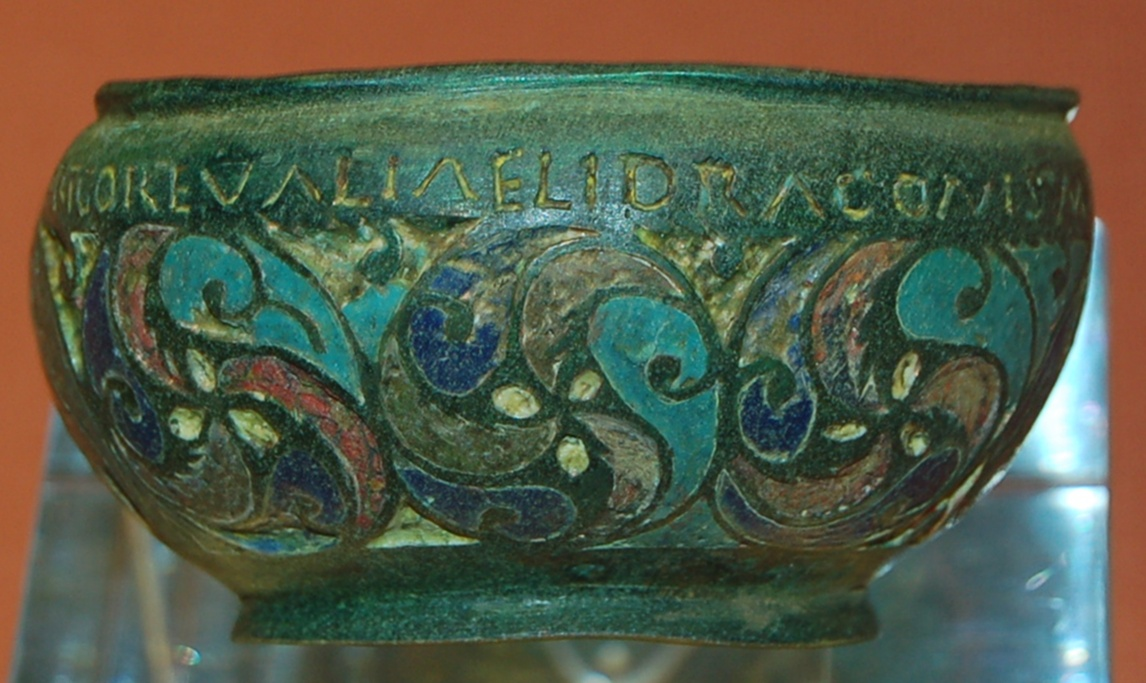
Staffordshire Moorlands Pan

Composite image of the entire decoration

The full inscription

The Staffordshire Moorlands Pan, sometimes known as the Ilam Pan, is a 2nd-century AD enamelled bronze trulla with an inscription naming four of the forts of Hadrian's Wall. Its decoration uses coloured vitreous enamel, in antiquity a speciality of Celtic art, in ornamental forms that provide a very rare link between Iron Age and Early Medieval "Celtic" art.

It weighs 132.5 g (4.67 oz), and is 47 mm (1.9 in) high with a maximum diameter of 94 mm (3.7 in), and is 54 mm (2.1 in) around the outside of the base. It has been suggested that in addition to its functional role as a cooking or serving vessel it may have been a 'souvenir' of Hadrian's Wall, made for a soldier who had served there. It may have been made as a decorative pan and was then customised by having an inscription added later (using an engraved, rather than relief-cast, inscription as in other enamelled objects of this type).

It was found in June 2003 in Ilam parish, Staffordshire (well to the south of Hadrian's Wall), by metal-detectorists, and, in 2005, was bought jointly by the Tullie House Museum in Carlisle, the Potteries Museum in Stoke-on-Trent and London's British Museum, with the help of a grant of £112,200 from the Heritage Lottery Fund. It is a find of great national and international significance. The pan is exhibited on a rotating basis, between a number of locations, including the joint owning museums and another museum on Hadrian's Wall.

== Description ==
The Staffordshire Moorlands Pan, although lacking its handle and base, is an extremely well preserved enamelled and inscribed bronze (strictly speaking, "copper alloy") vessel for cooking and serving food, decorated in a Celtic style. The Celtic peoples of the Roman period made more use of enamel on metal than other parts of the Empire.

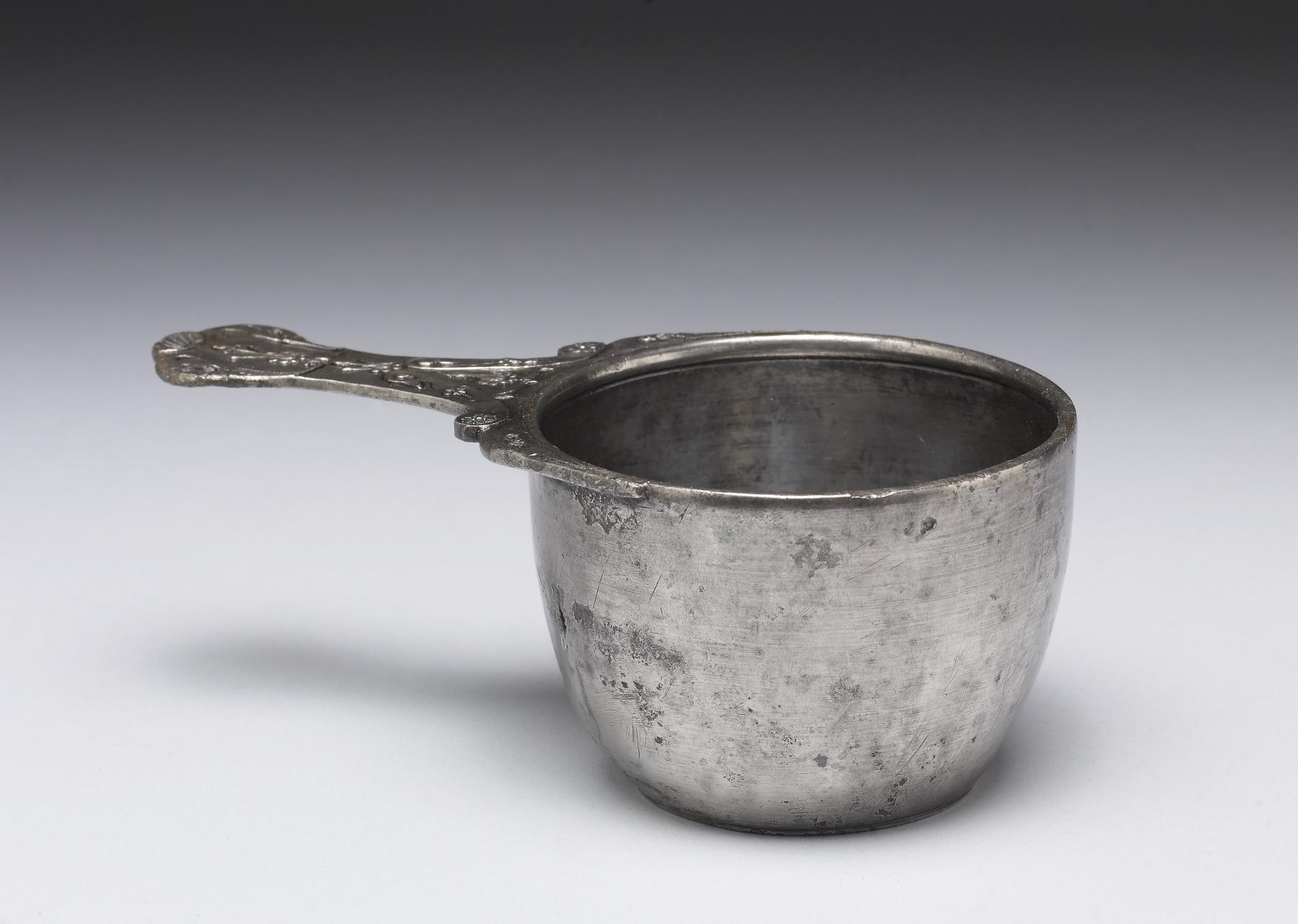
A complete trulla in silver

The decoration consists of "eight roundels, with eight pairs of intervening hollow-sided triangles. Each roundel encloses a swirling six-armed whirligig centred on a three-petalled device inlaid with red, blue, turquoise and yellow-coloured enamel." The inscription round the rim is engraved and then filled with enamel. It names forts on the wall: MAIS (Bowness-on-Solway), COGGABATA (Drumburgh), VXELODVNVM (Stanwix), CAMMOGLANNA (Castlesteads). The final part: RIGORE VALI AELI DRACONIS, is more elusive in meaning, but refers to the wall VALI, and probably a soldier DRACO. AELI may be part of his name, but was also Hadrian's family name, so may go with VALI, indicating that the Romans called the wall the "Aelian Wall".

There are other comparable trullae, and two with inscriptions relating to the wall; the inscription means this piece was almost certainly manufactured locally. Judging by these other finds, the handle would have been flat, with enamel decoration on the upper surface. The Rudge Cup has a different shape, but also names forts on the wall (see that article for the Amiens Skillet, another vessel with inscribed fort names).

The dragonesque brooch is a Romano-British type, often utilizing enamel, found mostly in northern England, probably made from around 75 to 175.
