= Dragonesque brooch =

Romano-British brooch type made between AD 75 & 175

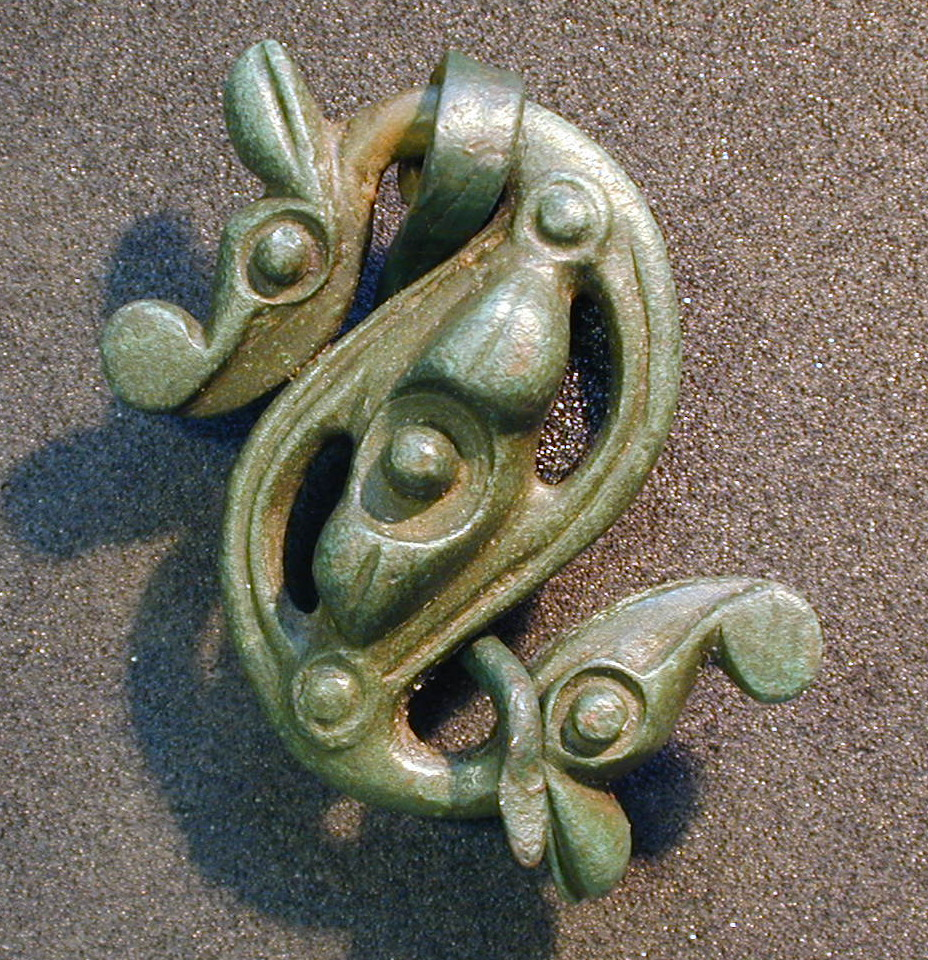
Well-preserved brooch found in Yorkshire. The pin is attached around the top neck and secured by bending round the lower neck. No remaining enamel, 48 mm long.

The dragonesque brooch is a distinctive type of Romano-British brooch made in Roman Britain between about 75 and 175 AD. They have been found in graves and elsewhere, in recent years especially by metal detectorists, and were evidently a fairly affordable style; over 200 examples are now known. The name comes from a supposed resemblance to a dragon, but Catherine Johns suggests that if any real animal was intended to be represented, the hare may be the most likely candidate.

They have the form of a double-headed animal with a thin, flat S-shaped body, a head at each end, "large upstanding ears, and a curled snout", and a pin allowing them to be used for fastening clothes. The back is normally plain. They are typically about 50 mm (2 in) long. They are in cast bronze (or at least a copper alloy), and about two-thirds feature decoration in vitreous enamel, now often mostly fallen away, which was a speciality of the pre-conquest Celtic art of Britain. In terms of style, they are regarded as Celtic rather than Roman or classical; they "express the continuing Celtic aesthetic in the provincial Roman mileu", despite being "Roman products that did not exist in the Celtic Iron Age" before the conquest.

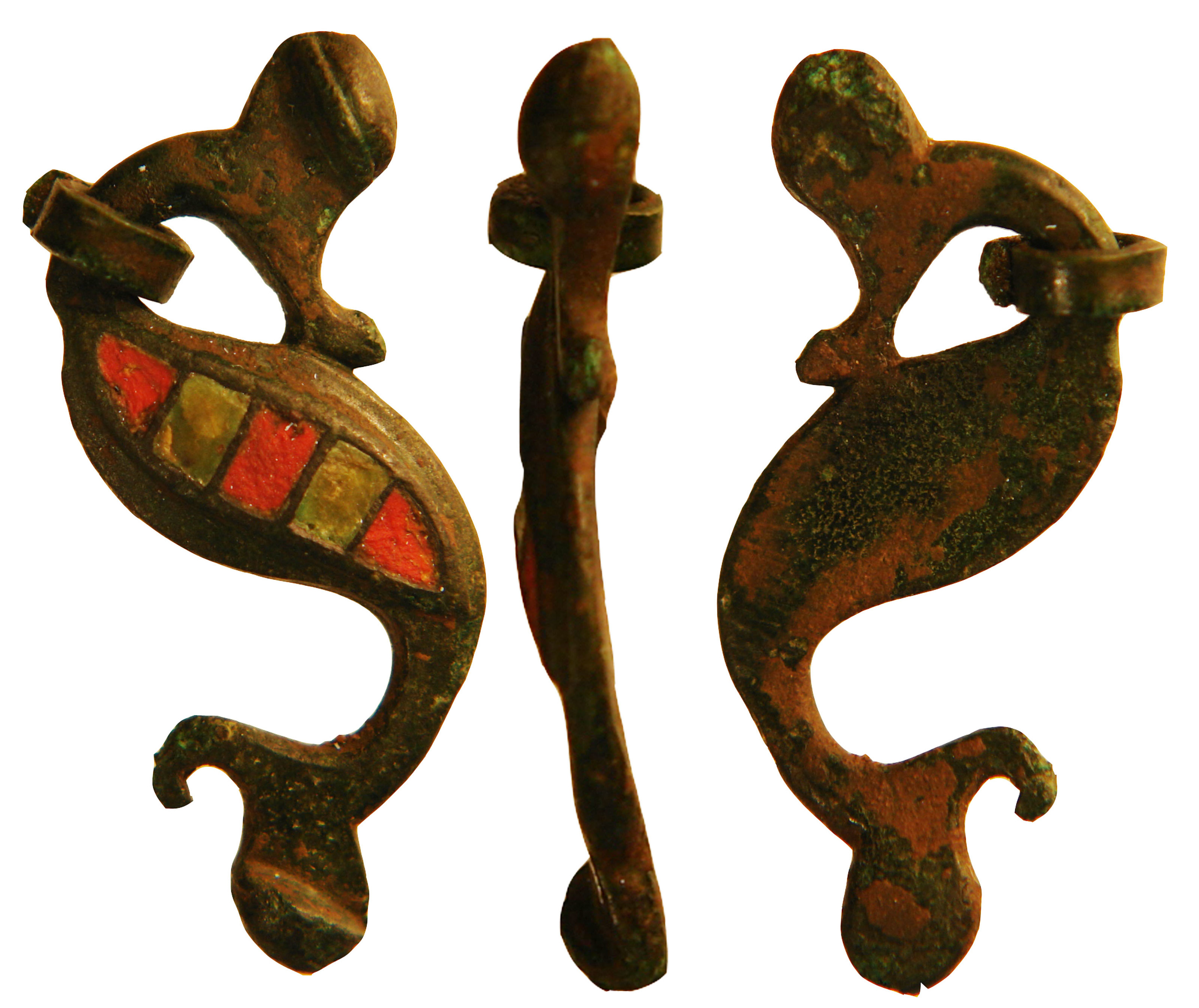
Front, side and back of a brooch found near Doncaster; only the ring of the pin survives

They are sometimes found in pairs, but with both examples facing in the same direction, saving the need for a different mould but at the expense of symmetry. These were probably worn below the shoulders, perhaps mostly by women, and perhaps connected by a chain or cord. The thickness of the pins, often square in section, suggests they were used to fasten clothing in thick, loosely-woven textiles; finer materials would have been damaged.

Most are found incomplete, especially in the pins, where only the circle attachment may remain, or part of the shaft, or nothing. The enamel has very often fallen out, in whole or in part. Many bodies have broken into two or more pieces. Their original appearance would have been much brighter, the metal probably kept polished. The style is "ever-popular on the antiquities market", and often copied in modern craft jewellery.

== Distribution ==
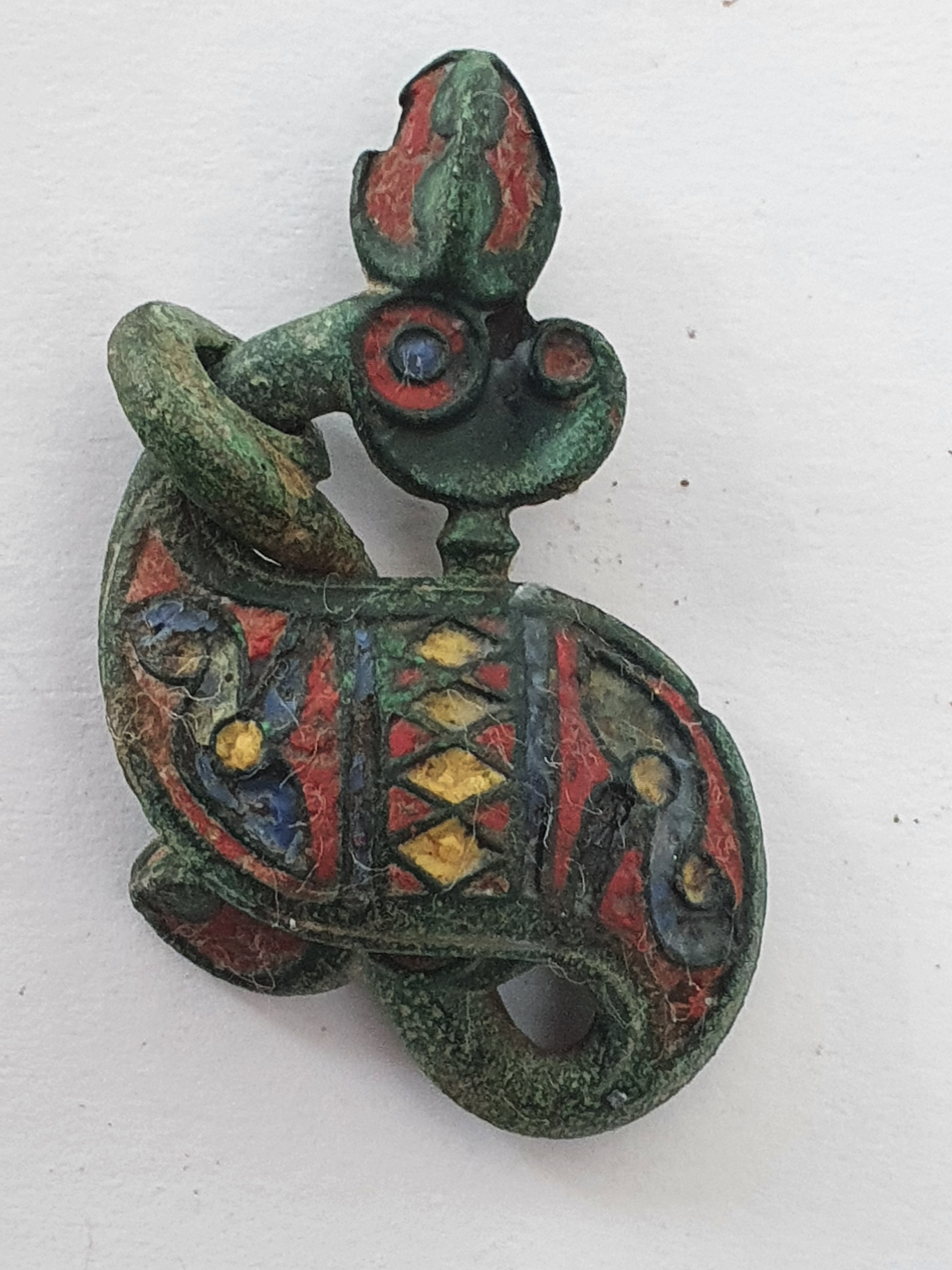
Brooch found near Doncaster, with good enamel. The lower head is bent under, and half the pin missing. It is 43 mm long.

Most examples have been found in the "military districts" or frontier region of what is now northern England, with (in 2012) over 75% of known examples from north of a line joining the rivers Severn and Humber. Some have come from modern Scotland, especially six from Trapain Law and some from Edinburgh, both north of Hadrian's Wall but south of the Antonine Wall, so briefly in Roman control during this period. The military base of Coria (Corbridge) in Northumberland has produced a number of finds. The northern area where they are found, called Brigantia, was then the home of Britain's largest tribal confederation, the Brigantes, and some writers have connected them to the manufacture of the brooches, even attempting more precise localization.

It has been suggested that enamel was more popular with the military, with finds from non-military sites, rural and probably "native", less likely to have it. Like other popular styles of brooch, they may have been made by itinerant jewellers, or by fixed workshops with distribution and sales by others; or by a combination of these.

Other types of Romano-British brooch with Celtic stylistic elements were popular in military contexts in the frontier area; the Staffordshire Moorlands Pan is the best survival of a small group of larger trullae with Celtic-style enamel, and the names of forts on Hadrian's Wall in Latin, presumed to be soldiers' souvenirs.

A few examples of the dragonesque brooch found in continental Europe are thought to have been carried there from Britain by their owners.

== Classification ==
Although the essential design remains constant, there are a variety of treatments, and schemes of classification have been made, some based on the enamel decoration, others on the metal shape.

The champlevé enamel decoration includes the full range of colours known at the time (more than in pre-conquest Celtic work), and the ornamental style is essentially Roman, with squares and lozenge shapes prominent.

== Context ==
The brooches can be seen as part of wider changes in the Iron Age or Early Celtic art of Britain after the conquest. Large pieces of elite metalwork, with superb technical and artistic skill, like the gold Great Torc from Snettisham of about 70 BC, are no longer found. Instead there is a variety of much smaller pieces with "Celtic" decoration, above all brooches of several types, but also horse harness fittings, belt fittings, hair-pins, box and vessel mounts and handles, and the like, normally in bronze. These show a range of levels of technical skill and artistry. Some of these, including brooches, are traditional types of objects from the Iron Age, while others are new Roman forms. Dismissed as "trinkets" by some earlier historians, this group have received increased attention over recent decades.

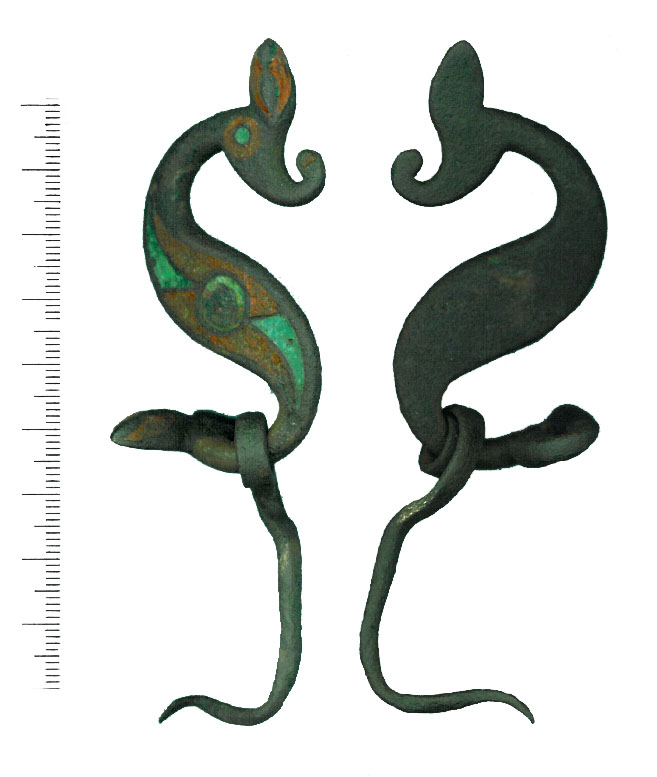
Front and back; North Lincolnshire

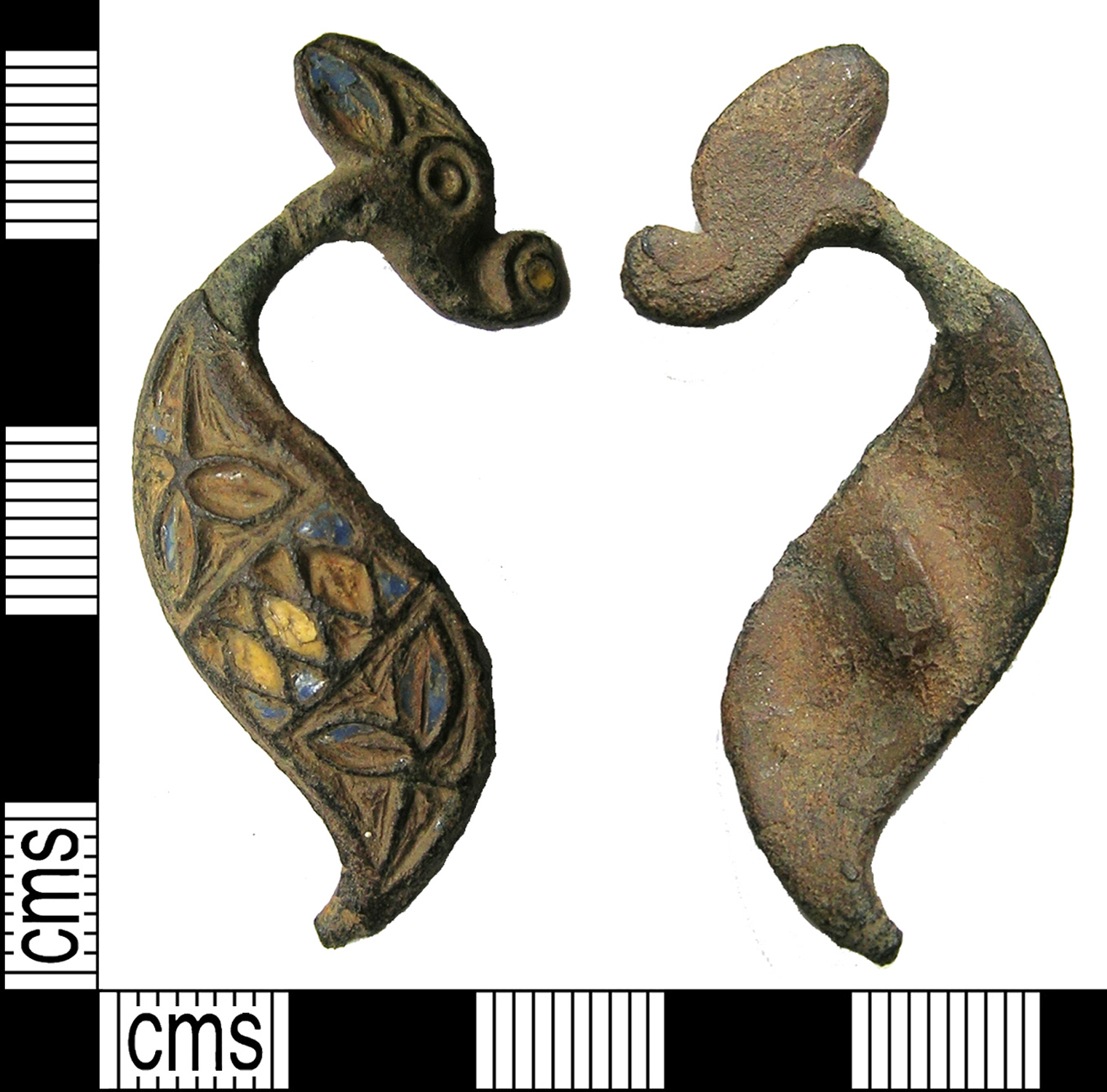
Incomplete, from Lancashire

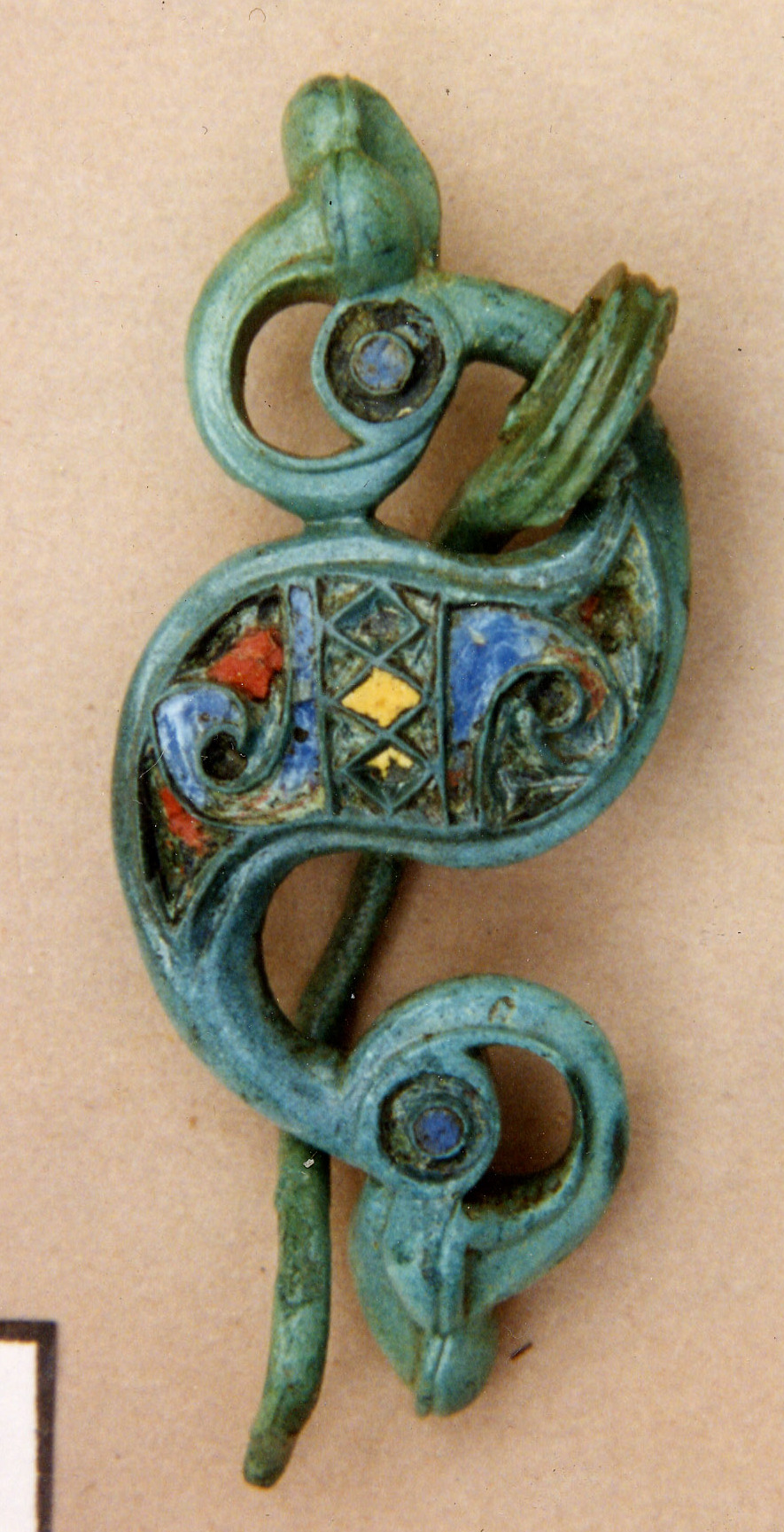
Complete and "impressive", Essex, 51 mm long

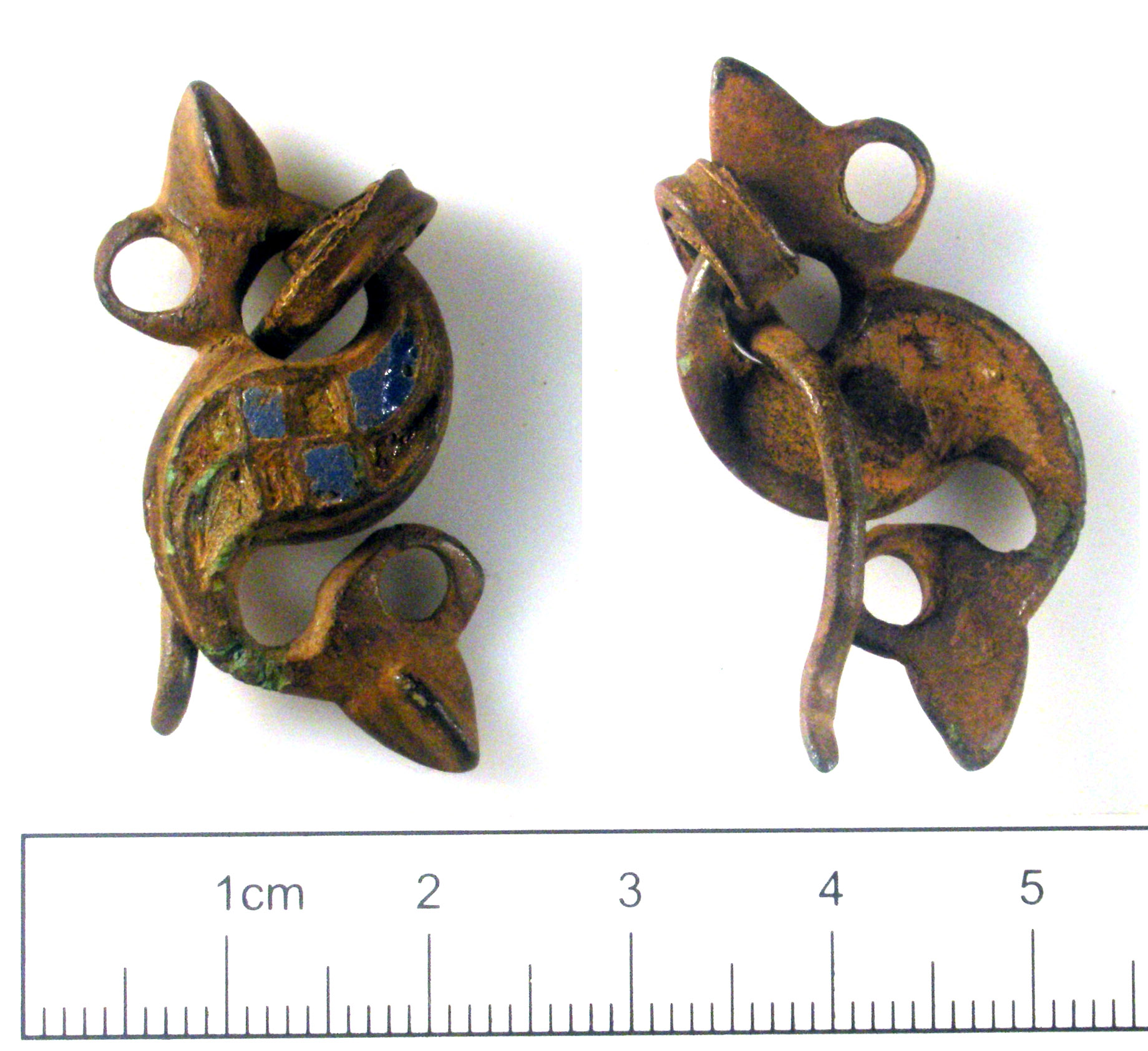
Complete, 38.4 mm long, East Riding, Yorkshire
