= Ala Gallorum Petriana =

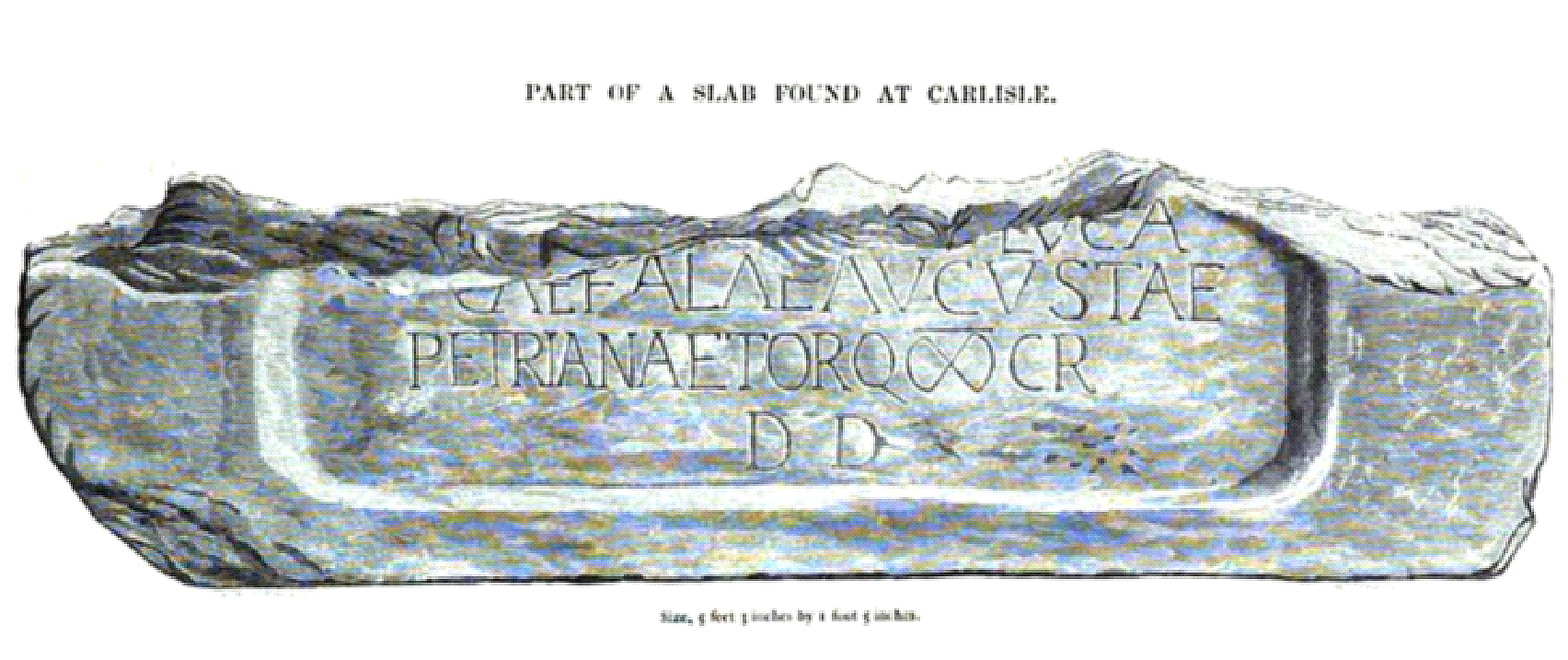
Fragment of inscription honoring one of the Prefects of the Ala Gallorum Petriana, found in Carlisle (CIL VII.929)

Ala Gallorum Petriana (English: "Petrianus' Ala of Gauls") was a Roman auxiliary unit. It is attested by military diplomas and inscriptions: in one inscription (RIB 957) it is referred to as Ala Augusta Petriana; in other inscriptions, Tacitus in his Histories, and in the Notitia dignitatum it is called Ala Petriana.

The unit was an ala milliaria. The nominal strength of the ala was 720 men, consisting of 24 turmae each with 30 horsemen.

== History ==
The Ala was stationed in the provinces of Germania, then afterwards Britannia. It is listed on military diplomas for the years 98 to 135 AD.

The unit was first stationed in the province of Germania in the 1st century. Perhaps the original name of the unit was Ala Pomponiana. At an uncertain time (possibly under Quintus Petillius Cerialis at 71/74), the Ala was transferred to the province of Britannia, where its presence is first attested by a military diploma dated to 98. Other diplomas dated from 122 to 135 attest the unit remained in Britannia.

The unit is mentioned for the last time in the Notitia dignitatum. It was under the direction of a prefectus, who was subordinate the Dux Britanniarum.

== Locations ==
Locations of the Ala in Germania were possibly:

- Mogontiacum (modern Mainz); here the inscription of Caius Julius Augurinus, Prefectus of the Ala c. AD 56, was found.

Locations of the Ala in Britannia include:

- Coria (Corbridge): the gravestone of Flavinus was found here.
- Petriana (Stanwix at Carlisle): the Notitia dignitatum places the unit here.
