= Milecastle 65 =

Milecastle on Hadrian's Wall

- Location within Cumbria
- 54.912602°N 2.924106°W
- Type: Milecastle
- Location: Cumbria, England

Milecastle 65 (Tarraby) was a milecastle on Hadrian's Wall (grid reference NY40855793).

== Description ==
Milecastle 65 is located about 1 km northwest of the Roman fort of Petriana on a west-facing slope 150 metres southwest of the hamlet of Tarraby in the former Carlisle district. There are no visible remains of the milecastle. A Roman altar and a sword were supposedly found near this site in the 19th century.

To the south, a short section of the Vallum can be seen in the fields, running parallel to the B6264 road. It survives as a broad depression 10 metres wide and 0.5 metres deep.

== Excavations ==
A trial excavation was conducted at the southwest corner of the milecastle in 1976, following a geophysical survey. At least two courses of foundations were found to survive, and the geophysical survey indicated that internal cobble flooring survives as buried remains. The milecastle is thought to be of the short axis type.

== Associated turrets ==
Each milecastle on Hadrian's Wall had two associated turret structures. These turrets were positioned approximately one-third and two-thirds of a Roman mile to the west of the Milecastle, and would probably have been manned by part of the milecastle's garrison. The turrets associated with Milecastle 65 are known as Turret 65A (grid reference NY405575) and Turret 65B (grid reference NY402571). None of the turrets between Milecastles 59 and 72 were sought or identified prior to 1961, and the exact locations of turrets 65A and 65B have not been found.

Turret 65A is thought to be about 250 metres east of Beech Grove. Turret 65B corresponds to the site of Stanwix Roman Fort, and is likely to have been replaced by the fort when it was constructed. Excavations in 1975 at the calculated position of Turret 65B found only wall core. It is thus unknown whether Turret 65B was replaced by the fort before or after the replacement of the Turf Wall by the Stone Wall.
