= William Sprigg (pamphleteer) =

William Sprigg (fl. 1655–1695) was an English pamphleteer, known for his republican work A Modest Plea (1659)

== Life ==
He was born in or near Banbury, Oxfordshire, a younger son of William Sprigg, steward of New College, Oxford, and brother of Joshua Sprigg. He matriculated at Oxford on 2 October 1652, and the same year graduated B.A. (12 October), and was elected (11 December) fellow of Lincoln on the recommendation of the chancellor of the university, Oliver Cromwell. Having proceeded M.A. on 15 June 1655, he was elected fellow of Cromwell's new foundation, Durham College in 1657, and on the dissolution of that college in 1659 he was incorporated at Cambridge.

He was admitted on 27 November 1657 a member of Gray's Inn, where he was called to the bar in 1664. He had been ejected from the Lincoln fellowship on the Restoration, and soon after his call to the bar he migrated to Dublin, where he married and resided for some years. On his brother's death in 1684 he returned to England, and thenceforth resided on the Crayford estate. He was living in 1695.

== Works ==
Sprigge was author of

- Philosophical Essays, with brief Advisos, accommodated to the capacity of the Ladies and Gentlemen sometime Students of the English Academy lately erected at London, &c., London, 1657.
- A Modest Plea for an equal Commonwealth against Monarchy, in which the genuine Nature and true Interest of a Free State is briefly stated, and its consistency with a National Clergy, Mercenary Lawyers, and Hereditary Nobility examined; together with the expediency of an agrarian and rotation of officers asserted. Also An Apology for Younger Brothers, the Restitution of Gavilkind and Relief of the Poor. With a lift at Tythes, and Reformation of the Lawes and Universities, London, 1659.
- The Royal and Happy Poverty; or a Meditation on the Felicities of an Innocent and happy Poverty, grounded on Matt. v. 3, London, 1660.
