= Berlanga de Duero =

- Municipality
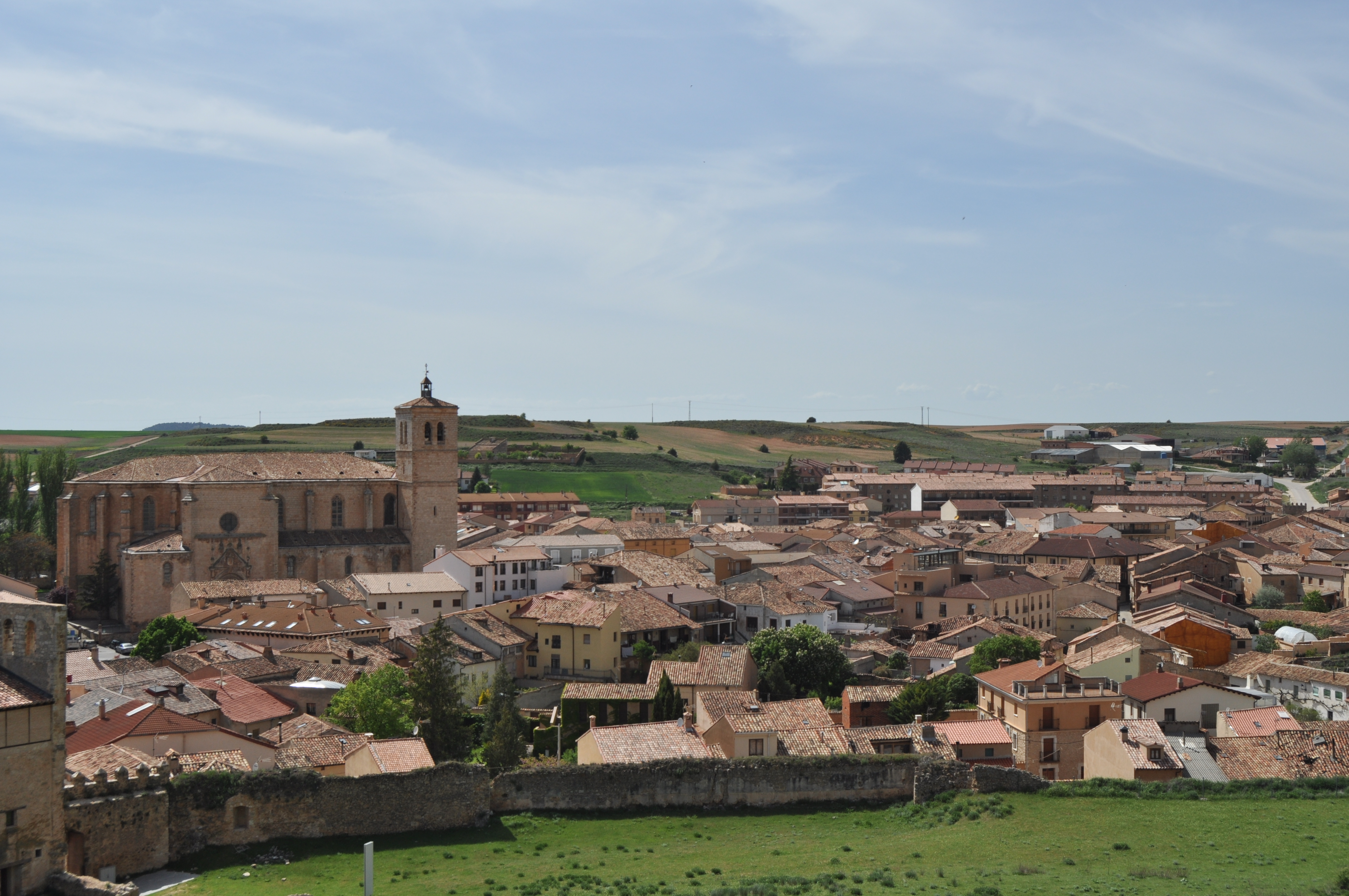

- Flag Coat of arms

- Location in Spain Berlanga de Duero (Spain)
- Country: Spain
- Autonomous community: Castile and León
- Province: Soria
- Comarca: Comunidad de villa y tierra de Berlanga

Area
  - Total: 220.18 km^{2} (85.01 sq mi)
- Elevation: 936 m (3,071 ft)

Population (2025-01-01)
  - Total: 810
  - Density: 3.7/km^{2} (9.5/sq mi)
- Time zone: UTC+1 (CET)
  - Summer (DST): UTC+2 (CEST)
- Website: Official website

Berlanga de Duero is a municipality located in the province of Soria, in the autonomous region of Castile and León, Spain. According to the 2017 census (conducted by the INE), the municipality has a population of 902 inhabitants.

== History ==
Three archaeological investigations have found Roman remains at Berlanga, including pottery and glass fragments and the Berlanga Cup. The Berlanga Cup lists the names of four forts on Hadrian's Wall, and possibly belonged to a legionary veteran from a Spanish cohort who returned home after service in Britain.

Following the expulsion of the Jews of Spain in 1492, Berlanga appears in royal legal records involving conversos (Jews who had converted to Christianity), with cases showing some family members remaining Jewish and leaving in exile while others later returned and adopted Christianity.

== Geography ==
Berlanga de Duero sits at 934 metres (3,064 ft) above sea level in the northeastern foothills of the Ayllón mountain range. It has a continental Mediterranean climate, with long, cool winters—due in part to its altitude. The town is bisected by the Douro river, from which it derives part of its name, as well as the Douro's tributaries, the Escalote and Talegones.

=== Climate ===
Climate data for Berlanga de Duero, 1961-2003
Month	Jan	Feb	Mar	Apr	May	Jun	Jul	Aug	Sep	Oct	Nov	Dec	Year
Mean daily maximum °C (°F)	6.3 (43.3)	8.2 (46.8)	11.9 (53.4)	14.7 (58.5)	18.6 (65.5)	24 (75)	28.1 (82.6)	27.6 (81.7)	23.5 (74.3)	16.3 (61.3)	10.8 (51.4)	7.3 (45.1)	16.4 (61.5)
Daily mean °C (°F)	2.2 (36.0)	3.4 (38.1)	6.3 (43.3)	8.8 (47.8)	12.3 (54.1)	16.8 (62.2)	20.2 (68.4)	19.9 (67.8)	16.5 (61.7)	10.7 (51.3)	6 (43)	3.3 (37.9)	10.5 (50.9)
Mean daily minimum °C (°F)	−1.9 (28.6)	−1.4 (29.5)	0.7 (33.3)	2.8 (37.0)	5.9 (42.6)	9.6 (49.3)	12.2 (54.0)	12.1 (53.8)	9.5 (49.1)	5 (41)	1.2 (34.2)	−0.7 (30.7)	4.6 (40.3)
Average precipitation mm (inches)	37 (1.5)	38 (1.5)	40 (1.6)	43 (1.7)	58 (2.3)	46 (1.8)	23 (0.9)	22 (0.9)	40 (1.6)	44 (1.7)	46 (1.8)	47 (1.9)	484 (19.1)
Source: Ministerio de Agricultura, Alimentación y Medio Ambiente. Datos de precipitación para el periodo 1961-2003 y de temperatura para el periodo 1961-2003 en Berlanga de Duero (6558).

== Gallery ==
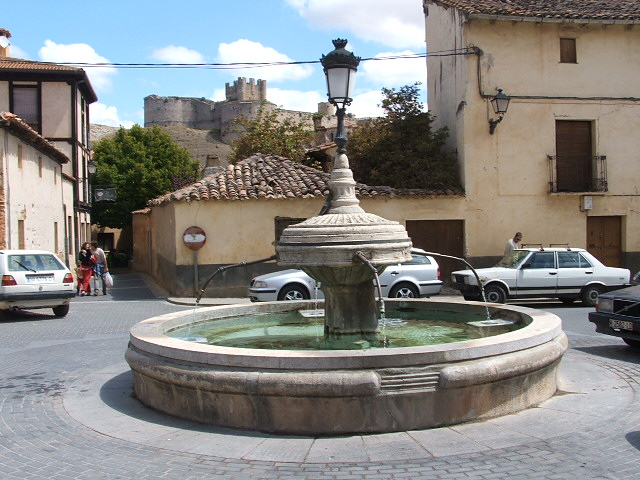
Fountain in Berlanga with Berlanga Castle in the background

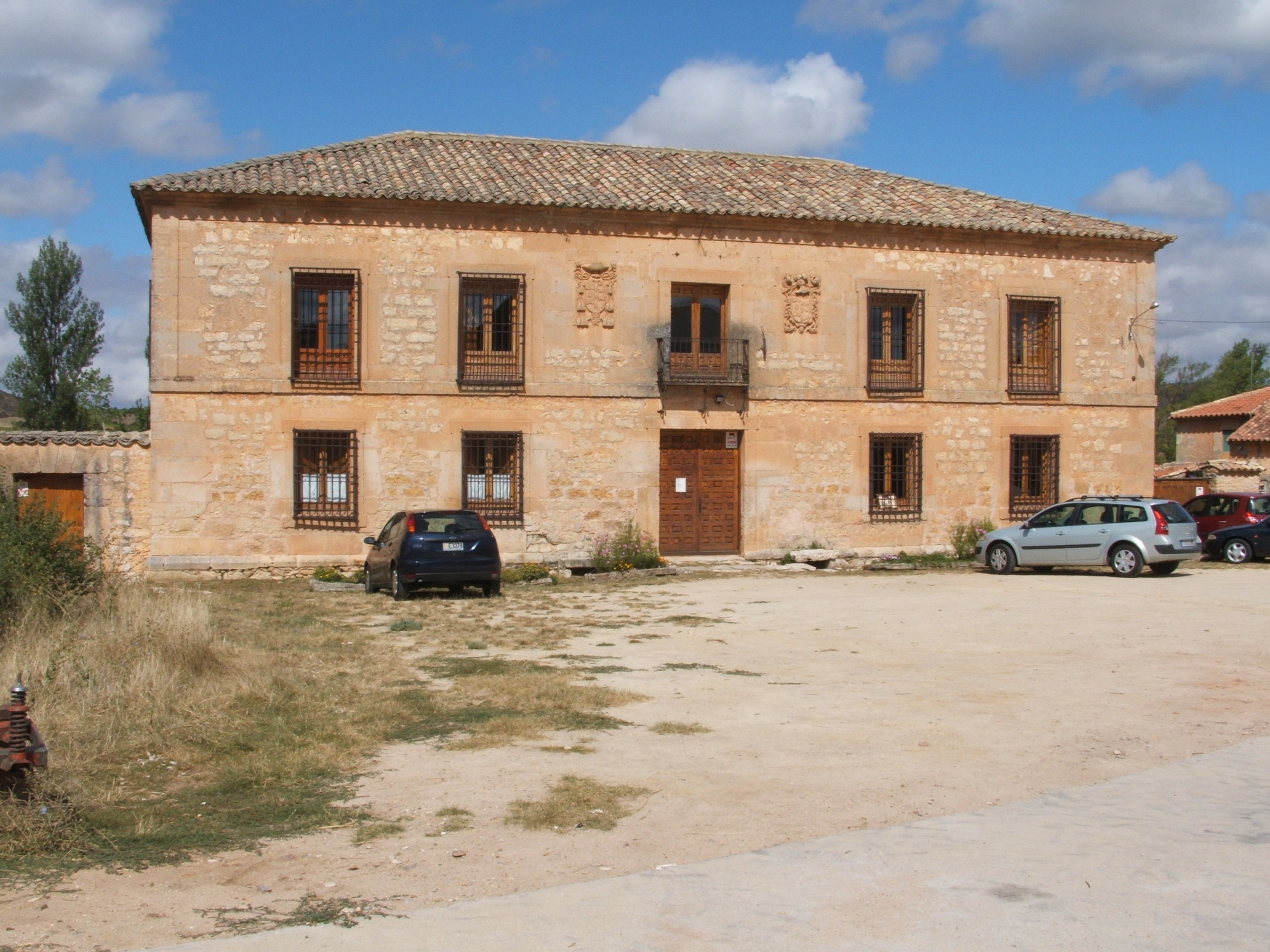
Renaissance-style Palace of Brías, Berlanga de Duero.

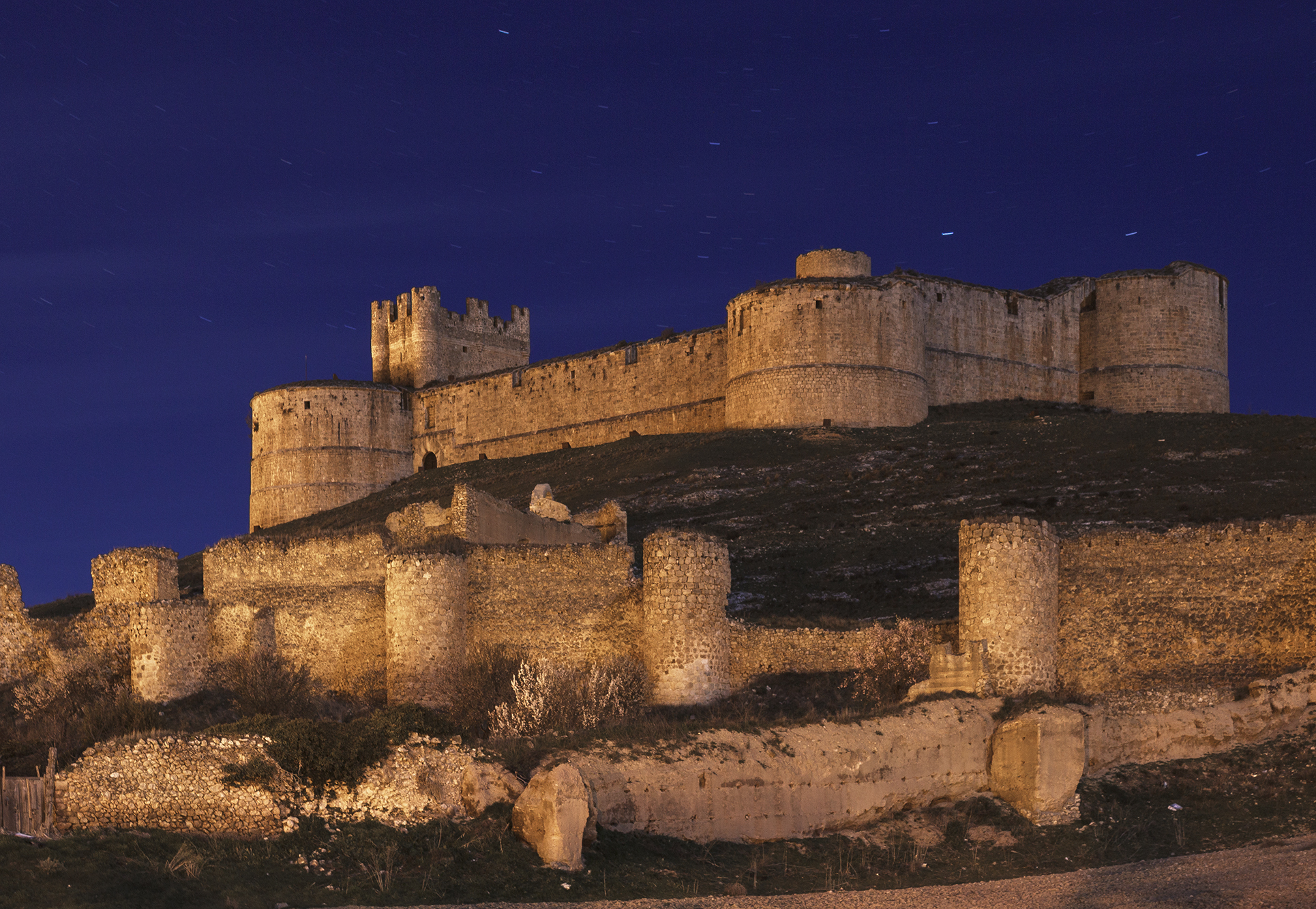
Castle of Berlanga de Duero
