= Joseph Hill (lexicographer) =

English academic and nonconformist clergyman

Joseph Hill (October 1625 – 5 November 1707) was an English academic and nonconformist clergyman, mostly in the Netherlands after 1662. He is known as a lexicographer.

== Life ==
He was born at Bramley, near Leeds, Yorkshire, in October 1625. His father, Joshua Hill (died 1636), was minister successively at Walmesley Chapel, Lancashire and Bramley Chapel, a nonconformist on wearing a surplice. Hill was educated at Pocklington School prior to his admittance to St. John’s College, Cambridge, which in 1644, graduated B.A. earlier than usual, was elected fellow of Magdalene College, Cambridge, and proceeded M.A. in 1649. He was a successful tutor, was senior proctor 1658, and in 1660 kept the act for B.D.

When he declined to conform to the Act of Uniformity 1662, he lost his position. He went to London, and preached a while at Allhallows Barking. He travelled abroad in 1663, and entered Leiden University as a student 29 March 1654. He was elected (19 June 1667) to the pastorate of the Scottish church at Middelburg, Zeeland. From 1668, a stipend was paid to him by the Provincial States. The Third Anglo–Dutch War of 1672–1674 caused him to become a figure in politics. He wrote (November 1672) a political pamphlet, which he had difficulty in getting printed. In April 1673, it appeared, printed at his own expense, in Dutch at Amsterdam, and in English; he advocated the English alliance, and vindicated Charles II from suspicion of popery. On 19 August 1673, he was ordered by resolution of the States to quit Zeeland, with permission to return at the close of the war. In London, he went to Charles, who rewarded him for his pamphlet with a sinecure, and tried the offer of a bishopric if he conformed. On 13 January 1678, he became minister of the English presbyterian church on the Haringsvliet, Rotterdam, and held this office until his death on 5 November 1707.

== Works ==
Hill's major work was the expansion of Schrevelius's Greek-Latin Lexicon, which he edited 1663, adding 8,000 words. The Latin-Greek portion was edited by J. Hutchinson. He wrote also on the Antiquities of Temples, 1696, and Artificial Churches, 1698; a sermon on Moderation in the Cripplegate morning exercise, 1677; and a funeral sermon for Mary Reeve, 1685.
