= Stanwix =

District of Carlisle, Cumbria, England

Coordinates: 54°54′N 2°56′W

Stanwix is a district of Carlisle, Cumbria in North West England. The ward population (called Stanwix Urban) had a population taken at the 2011 census of 5,934. It is located on the north side of River Eden, across from Carlisle city centre. Although long counted as a suburb it did not officially become part of the city until 1912 when part of the civil parish of Stanwix became part of the parish, city and municipal borough of Carlisle. Further areas were added to the city, which was by then a county borough, in 1934 and 1951. The remaining part of the parish was eventually renamed Stanwix Rural in 1966.

== Toponymy ==
'Stanwix' means " 'stone wall(s)', v. 'stǣna', 'wag' or 'veggr' 'Stǣna' is Old English and 'veggr' is Old Norse and cognate with Old English 'wag'. Stanwix is built on the site of a Roman fort known as Uxelodunum or Petriana, the former meaning "high fort". "Dun" is a Celtic word for fort which is to be found in many place-names.

== Location ==
The former village of Stanwix was centred on its church of St Michael's at the top of a steep bank rising from the river Eden, close to the junction of the main road north (now the A7) with the road to the east (now the B6264). The area around the church is built on the site of the fort of Uxelodunum (a linear earthwork at the southern end of the churchyard appears to reflect the line of the southern defences).

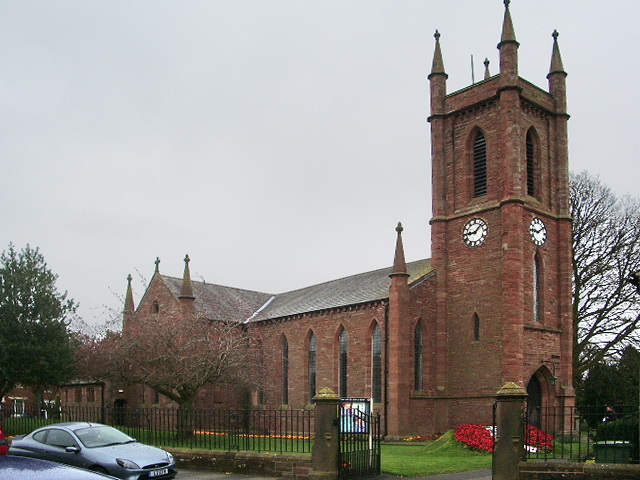
St Michael's Church, Stanwix

The fort was the largest on Hadrian's Wall, which adjoined the northwest edge of the fort. The course of Hadrian's Wall runs through the suburb. Probably most of the Roman masonry was taken to construct other buildings. However, in 2017 a bathhouse was discovered at Carlisle Cricket Club's Edenside ground. This facility is believed to have been for the use of the fort or possibly a mansio.

In the mid nineteenth century the district grew with many large houses built for Carlisle's expanding middle classes. Today Stanwix includes the areas of Edentown, Whiteclosegate, St Anne's Hill and Belah.

== Notable buildings ==
Near the church today is a small parade of shops and other businesses. Morrisons and Aldi supermarkets and a Sainsbury's Local store are located in the area as well. A little further north at Kingstown is a large Asda superstore. The University of Cumbria has a campus on Brampton Road (formerly the main campus of the Cumbria Institute of the Arts). There is also a Roman Catholic private school called Austin Friars St Monica's School located at St. Anne's Hill.

A single bridge, the grade I listed Eden Bridge designed by Robert Smirke, crosses the River Eden to connect Stanwix and other northern reaches of the district to Carlisle city centre. Numerous households in low-lying areas in Stanwix were badly affected by the flooding of the River Eden during the Carlisle Floods of January 2005.

The main road running northwards through Stanwix is Scotland Road, and until 2012 had the dubious distinction of carrying the same daily volume of traffic as the nearby M6 motorway. In 2012 the "northern relief road" opened, around the north-west of Carlisle, which should ease congestion.
