= Joseph Hallett =

Joseph Hallett may refer to:

- Joseph Hallett II (1656–1722), English nonconformist minister and dissenting academy tutor
- Joseph Hallett III (c. 1691–1744), his son, English nonconformist minister and author
