= James Peirce =

English dissenting minister

James Peirce (1674?–1726) was an English dissenting minister, the catalyst for the Salter's Hall controversy.

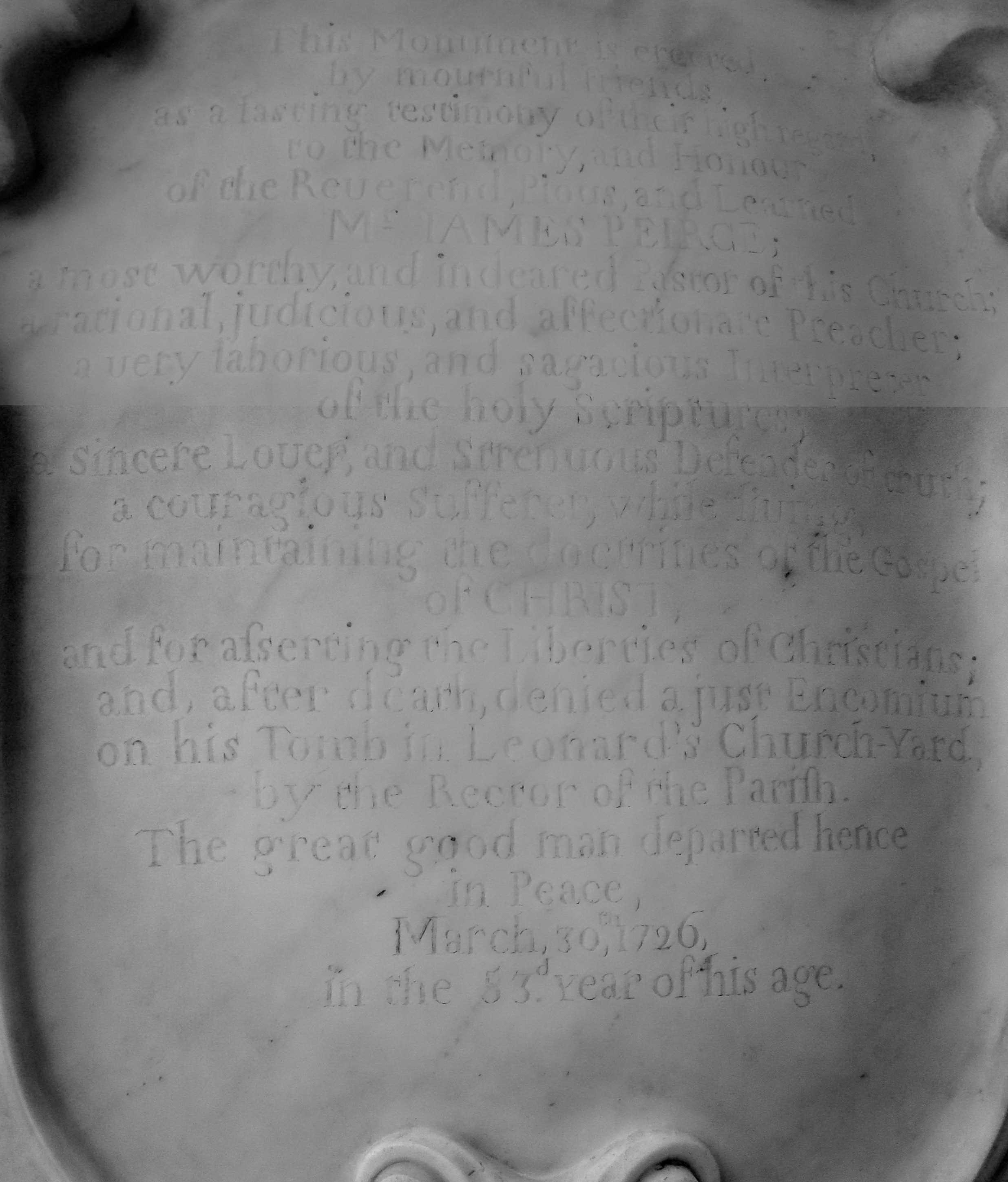
This Monument is erected by mournful friends as a lasting testimony of their high regard, to the Memory and Honour of the Reverend, Pious, and Learned Mr JAMES PEIRCE; a most worthy and indeared Pastor of this Church; a rational, judicious, and affectionate Preacher; a very laborious, and sagacious interpreter of the holy Scriptures; a sincere Lover, and Strenuous Defender of truth; a courageous sufferer, while living, for maintaining the doctrines of the Gospel of CHRIST. And for asserting the Liberties of Christians; and, after death, denied a just Encomium on his Tomb in Leonard's Church-Yard, by the Rector of the Parish. The great good man departed hence in Peace, 30 March 1726, in the 53d year of his age.

== Early life ==
The son of John Peirce, he was born at Wapping about 1674. His parents, who were in easy circumstances, were members of the congregational church at Stepney, under Matthew Mead. Left an orphan about 1680, he was placed, with a brother and sister, in the charge of Mead as guardian. Mead took him into his own house, and educated him with his son Richard Mead. He was taught by John Nesbitt and Thomas Singleton; he then studied at Utrecht (from 1689) and Leyden (from 1692). At Utrecht he formed a lasting friendship with his fellow-student Adrian Reland, the orientalist; and he made friendships among his class-mates at Leyden, then the gathering-place of the upper crust of English dissent. He travelled in Flanders and Germany before returning home in 1695.

After spending some time in Oxford, to study at the Bodleian Library, he returned to London, was admitted (11 February 1697) a member of Mead's church, and preached the evening lecture at Miles Lane congregational church, of which Matthew Clarke the younger was minister. He did not interest himself in the current disputes in London between Presbyterians and Congregationalists; and was ordained in 1699 by four London Presbyterians, headed by Matthew Sylvester, the literary executor of Richard Baxter. His own ideal of church government was based on Baxter's rectoral theory; he had no theoretical objection to a modified episcopacy.

== Minister ==
Early in 1701 Peirce's Presbyterian friends urged his acceptance of a charge in Green Street, Cambridge, where there was a mixed congregation of Independents and Presbyterians; in 1696 some of Joseph Hussey's congregation had seceded to it. Agreeing to take it for three years, he was duly 'dismissed' to it by the Stepney church. He held it for six years (1701–6). Pierce still was ranked as an Independent, for he was made a trustee of the Hog Hill chapel on 23 January 1702. At Cambridge he was intimate with William Whiston, who described him as 'the most learned of all the dissenting teachers I have known.' He read much, especially in the topics of nonconformist controversy. John Fox described him as sitting in his study from nine at night till four or five next morning.

His move to the presbyterian congregation at Toomer's Court, Newbury, Berkshire, probably coincided with his first controversial publication (end of 1706) in defence of nonconformist positions against Edward Wells. The appearance of his Vindiciæ (1710) in reply to the Defensio (1707) of William Nicholls brought him into prominence as a nonconformist polemicist. According to Fox the latinity of the Vindiciæ was corrected by Thomas Knipe. The work, which is dedicated to the clergy of the church of Scotland, contains a digest of nonconformist history and argument; the theology of the second part is strongly Calvinistic.

Early in 1713 he received a call to succeed George Trosse as one of the ministers of James's Meeting, Exeter, to preach also in rotation at the Little Meeting. Peirce accepted the offer and settled in Exeter before the end of 1713. His congregation numbered 1100.

== Theological views ==
He had subscribed (1697) the doctrinal part of the Anglican articles as the condition of toleration. But the theology in which he had been bred was Sabellian, as he afterwards discovered when introduced to orthodoxy by reading St. Basil. In fact, the theological tone of the less cultivated dissenters was, in his judgment, largely patripassian. On hearing of Whiston's change of views, he wrote to him from Newbury (10 July 1708) expressing amazement that he should 'fall in with the unitarians,’ and referring to the case of Thomas Emlyn. Whiston's books, and the Scripture Doctrine of the Trinity (1712) by Samuel Clarke, he did not read until 1713, at Whiston's suggestion. He became convinced that it was safest to adhere closely to the letter of scripture. Before going to Exeter, he disused the ordinary doxology. Whiston claimed him as a unitarian; he held (with Clarke) a subordination of the Son, but he emphasised his rejection of Arianism and defends himself (as Clarke had done) by citing the authority of George Bull and John Pearson.

Peirce's first controversy at Exeter was on the question of ordination. On 5 May 1714 he preached to the 'united ministers' a sermon with the title 'An Useful Ministry a Valid One.' It was at once supposed that he had abandoned the defence of dissenting ordination. Preaching again at the ordination (19 October 1715) of John Lavington, as one of the ministers of Bow Meeting, Exeter, he distinguished between a valid and a regular ministry, asserting the irregularity of existing episcopal ordination, and maintaining, against the independents, that not the people, but the ministers, and they only, may judge the qualifications of candidates and ordain. This he defined as 'presbyterian ordination,’ excluding, as Baxter had, the function of the lay eldership. His positions were criticised by Samuel Chandler, as well as by Anglican writers.

== Origins of the major controversy ==
The controversy which wrecked Peirce's reputation, and broke the doctrinal accord of the old dissent, began at the end of 1716, when Lavington attacked the orthodoxy of Hubert Stogdon. In April or May 1717, Henry Atkins of Puddington, Devonshire, preaching for Peirce during his absence in London, sounded an alarm of heresy. Peirce was asked (30 May) to preach on the atonement, and did so (2 June) in a guarded way, and on principles which differed from those of Trosse, his predecessor. On 15 July he joined Joseph Hallett II (1656–1722) and John Withers in giving a testimonial to Stogdon. At the 'assembly' in September he piloted Fox through his examination for license, refusing to require explications of scriptural terms. An expression in his Christmas sermon renewed the doubts of his soundness. In fact the danger of Arianism was a burning topic at the time. Sir Robert Price 'had spent most of his charge at the Exeter assizes against those errors.'

At Exeter a self-elected body of thirteen laymen managed the finance of the three congregations. Early in 1718 a deputation from this body came to Peirce and his colleagues, asking them to 'assert the eternity of the Son of God.' Peirce complied; for a time complaint ceased, but it was revived during his absence in London (July and August). In September the 'Exeter assembly' resolved, after much debate, that each minister should make a personal declaration on the subject of the Trinity. All complied except Samuel Carkeet and two others, and all the declarations were accepted except that of John Parr of Okehampton, who merely quoted Ephesians iv. 4–6. Lavington then drew up, as the general sense of the assembly, a short formula, which was carried by a large majority.

The body of thirteen, not satisfied with a 'general sense,’ appealed to the Exeter ministers for individual assurances. Failing in this, they sought advice from five London ministers, including Edmund Calamy, who deprecated London interference, and suggested a consultation with neighbouring divines. Seven Devon ministers, headed by John Ball, were called in (19 January 1719). They corresponded on the case with their London brethren. Peirce also wrote to his London friends, among whom the most influential was John Shute Barrington. Barrington, an independent, was the parliamentary leader of dissent. He had defeated a presbyterian amendment to the bill for repealing the Schism Act which would have introduced a new test in regard to the Trinity, on the express ground of Peirce's alleged heresies.

== 1719 Conference in London ==
Shute Barrington brought the Exeter dispute before the London committee, representing the civil interests of dissenters. The committee agreed (5 February) to lay a draft of 'advices for peace' before the whole body of London ministers of the three denominations; hence the Salters' Hall conferences, which began on 19 February, and broke up on 3 March. The rupture was in reference, not to the advice, but to the spirit in which it should be tendered. Both sections endorsed the principle of uncompromising independency, namely, that each congregation is sole judge of the errors which disqualify its ministers. The non-subscribing section sent its 'advices,’ with an orthodox letter, on 17 March; the 'advices' of the subscribing section, with an orthodox preamble, followed on 7 April; but the Exeter affair had already come to an issue, without any appeal to the congregation.

On 4 March the clerical council of seven gave judgment in writing, to the effect that denial of Christ's 'true and proper divinity' is a disqualifying error. On 5 March the 'thirteen' asked for an explicit statement on this head from the Exeter ministers. Peirce urged that the advices from London should be waited for; but the 'thirteen' declined to recognise 'advices' in which 'anabaptists' took part. Peirce then declined to subscribe to any proposition not in scripture (not even 'that three and two make five'). Hallett declined also; Withers faltered, and ultimately offered to subscribe the Nicene Creed; Lavington alone gave complete satisfaction.

== Aftermath and ejections ==
On 6 March the four proprietors of James's Meeting closed it against Peirce and Hallett; they were permitted, however, on the following Sunday (8 March) to preach at the Little Meeting. But on 10 March the proprietors of the several meeting-houses held a joint meeting, and agreed, without consulting others, to exclude Peirce and Hallett from them all. They were excluded also from their share in the income of the Elwill trust for dissenting ministers of Exeter. They still remained members of the Exeter assembly.

A temporary meeting-place was secured by 15 March, and a new building, the Mint Meeting, was soon erected (opened 27 December). The congregation, which numbered about three hundred, was classed as presbyterian in the lists of the London fund of that name; but Peirce declined any designation except Christian. In May 1719 the Exeter assembly called for a subscription from its members, identical with that adopted by the London subscribers. Peirce, with eighteen others, declined and seceded. The seceders subscribed a paper (6 May) repudiating the charge of Arianism, and making a confession in biblical terms. Peirce was not readmitted as a member, but was present as a visitor in September 1723. The ministers of Mint Meeting were admitted in 1753; the succession of ministers was maintained till 1810; subsequently (before 1817) the building was sold to Wesleyan Methodists, who erected another on its site.

== Later life ==
Peirce never rose above his summary ejection, though friends such as Peter King, 1st Baron King stood by him. He wrote numerous pamphlets in self-defence; the 'Letter' to Eveleigh is a piece of satire. He moved out of Exeter to a country house at St. Leonard's, in the suburbs, and lived among his books, working on paraphrases of St. Paul's Epistles, in continuation of the series begun by John Locke.

He broke a blood-vessel in his lungs, lingered a few days, and died on 30 March 1726. He was buried in the church-yard of St. Leonard's, near Exeter. His funeral sermon was preached by Joseph Hallett III (1691?–1744) who had followed his father as Peirce's colleague. Thomas Emlyn was invited to succeed him, but declined.

== Family ==
Peirce married Hannah Clarke, daughter of Matthew Clarke the Elder in 1698. They had one son, James, and at least three daughters, Hannah, Mary and Elizabeth. His wife survived him and died in 1754 in London.

== Works ==
Peirce published, besides single sermons (1714–23):

- Exercitatio Philosophica de Homœomeria Anaxagorea, Utrecht, 1692.
- Remarks on Dr. Wells's Letters, 1706–8, eight parts; 3rd edition, 1711.
- Some Considerations on ... a Vindication of the Office of Baptism, and ... the Sign of the Cross, 1708.
- Vindiciæ Fratrum Dissentientium in Anglia adversus … Nicholsii … Defensionem Ecclesiæ Anglicanæ, 1710; in English, A Vindication of the Dissenters, 1717; the translation, though otherwise augmented, omits a considerable portion of the "second part", among the omissions being a chapter on the charge of Socinianism brought against Anglican divines, in which Peirce contends that dissenters are free from this taint; 2nd edition, 1718; pt. iii. chapter 3 of the English edition, was reprinted as A Tractate on Church Music, 1786.
- An Enquiry into the present Duty of a Low-Churchman, 1711; anon. 1712.
- A Letter to Dr. Bennet ... concerning the Nonjurors' Separation, 1717; two editions same year; to Thomas Bennet.
- A Defence of the Dissenting Ministry and Presbyterian Ordination, 1717 (two parts).
- Vindication of the Protestant Dissenters, 1717
- The Dissenters' Reasons for not Writing in the behalf of Persecution, 1718; three editions same year, addressed to Andrew Snape, D.D.
- Some Reflections upon Dean Sherlock's Vindication of the Corporation and Test Acts, 1718; two editions same year.
- The Interest of the Whigs with relation to the Test Act, 1718, (anon.); two editions same year.
- The Loyalty … of High Church and the Dissenters compar'd, 1719 (in reply to J. Jackman).
- The Case of the Ministers Ejected at Exon, 1719; four editions same year.
- The Charge of Misrepresentations maintain'd against … Sherlock, 1719.
- A Defence of the Case of the Ministers, 1719.
- A Justification of the Case of the Ministers, 1719.
- A Letter to Mr. Josiah Eveleigh, Exeter, 1719; Eveleigh was minister at Crediton, Devon, from 1702, and died on 9 September 1736.
- Animadversions upon … A True Relation of … Proceedings at Salters-Hall, 1719.
- A Letter ... in Defence of the Animadversions, 1719.
- A Second Letter to … Eveleigh, Exeter, 1719
- Remarks upon the Account of what was transacted in the Assembly at Exon, 1719; second edition, same year, has a Postscript.
- An Answer to Mr. Enty's Defence … of the Assembly, 1719; to John Enty.
- The Western Inquisition, 1720.
- The Security of Truth without … Persecution, 1721, (against Enty).
- Inquisition Honesty display'd, 1722.
- A Paraphrase and Notes on … Colossians, 1725 (anon.); reprinted, with name, 1727; 1733.
- A Paraphrase and Notes on ... Philippians, 1725 (anon.); reprinted, with name, 1727; 1733.

Posthumous were:

- A Paraphrase and Notes on … Hebrews, 1727 (edited by Hallett, his successor); also in Latin, J. Peircii Paraphrasis et Notæ ... in Epistolam ad Hebræos, 1747.
- Dissertations on Six Texts, 1727.
- An Essay in favour of ... giving the Eucharist to Children, 1728.
- Fifteen Sermons … To which is added A Scripture Catechism, 1728 (edited, with a memorial preface, by Benjamin Avery); contains the single sermons printed in his lifetime, and eight others.

His funeral sermon for Mrs. Hallett is reprinted in the Practical Preacher, 1762. Some above are doubtful.

Several anonymous pamphlets in the paper war at Exeter were ascribed to Peirce, and have been catalogued and referred to as his, apparently without ground; of these the most important is The Innocent vindicated, 1718; 2nd edition, 1719, which, Peirce says, he never read, and supposed to be by a lay hand; an appendix to the second edition has Thirteen Queries on the Trinity, which are defended as Peirce's in The Truth and Importance of the Scripture Doctrine of the Trinity, 1736, a publication against Daniel Waterland, which has been ascribed to Hallett.
