= Henry Phelps Brown =

British economist (1906–1994)

- Born: Ernest Henry Phelps Brown; 10 February 1906; Calne, England
- Died: 15 December 1994 (aged 88)
- Occupation: Economist
- Spouse(s): Evelyn Bowlby (two sons, one daughter)

Sir Ernest Henry Phelps Brown MBE, FBA (10 February 1906 – 15 December 1994) was a prominent British economist.

== Early years ==
Phelps Brown was born in Calne, Wiltshire. He won a scholarship to The Taunton Academy before winning an open scholarship to Wadham College at Oxford University to study first history, and then philosophy, politics & economics. He combined academic achievement with sporting prowess and enjoyment of the social life of the Oxford Union, attaining a First in History in 1927, a First in Politics, Philosophy and Economics in 1929, winning a half-blue for cross country running in 1926, and the Secretaryship of the Oxford Union in 1928. He was president of the Diagnostic Society in 1926.

== Career ==
Directly following completion of his undergraduate studies in 1929, Phelps Brown was appointed a Fellow of the New College, where he taught economics from 1930 to 1947, following a year in the United States as a Rockefeller Travelling Fellow.

Phelps Brown joined the British Army at the outbreak of World War II and was commissioned as a Second Lieutenant in the Royal Artillery. This followed a failed attempt to present himself for service in the Board of Trade as an economic statistician. The chief statistician at that beginning of the war was attempting to reduce the work-force and was releasing statisticians for other war-related work, and by the time a new chief statistician was in place and looked to hire statisticians again, Phelps Brown was embedded with his unit and chose not to leave them. In November 1939 he was posted to France as part of the British Expeditionary Force, and then in 1940 evacuated from Dunkirk.Following a period anti-aircraft gunning around London during the Blitz, in January 1943 he took part in the Operation Torch landings in Algeria, and subsequently in Tunisia became part of the 8th Army. With this formation he took part in the invasion of Sicily and the subsequent campaign in Italy, where he took part in battles such as Monte Cassino. His unit fired their guns for the last time at the crossing of the River Po, by which time he was an acting Lieutenant Colonel commanding a battalion. At the end of the war, he was awarded the MBE.

Phelps Brown returned to Oxford after the war, but had lost seniority to those professors who had remained at home, so in 1947 he left Oxford to accept an appointment as Professor of the Economics of Labour at the London School of Economics (LSE).

In 1960 he was elected a Fellow of the British Academy.

Phelps Brown remained at LSE until his retirement in 1968, at which time he returned to live in Oxford and spent the last 20 years of his life writing on various economic topics.

From 1970–72 he was President of the Royal Economic Society. In 1970, Henry Phelps Brown used his presidential address to the Royal Economic Society, "The Underdevelopment of Economics", to underline the mismatch between the problems of the greatest interest to professional economists, and those most in need of a solution from the point of view of society. 'My starting point is the smallness of the contribution that the most conspicuous developments of economics in the last quarter of a century have made to the solution of the most pressing problems of the times' and among these problems he lists 'checking the adverse effects on the environment and the quality of life of industrialism, population growth and urbanism'.

Phelps Brown received an Honorary Doctorate from Heriot-Watt University in 1972.

In 1976 he received a knighthood for his services to economics.

Phelps Brown is remembered as a careful and diligent teacher who prepared extensive notes for his students, and as a researcher who tied economics to social science to assess the impacts of economic theory on the lives of everyday people.

=== Public service ===
Phelps Brown was called upon by the British government on several occasions. In 1957, the Macmillan government formed the Council on Prices, Productivity and Incomes to monitor wage/price fluctuations. Phelps Brown was called to serve on this council, and sought to use an incomes policy to reduce inflation without driving higher unemployment. He was later called to help form the National Economic Development Council in 1962, and once again in 1974 to serve on the Royal Commission on Distribution of Income and Wealth (the "Diamond Commission").

== Writings ==
Phelps Brown wrote extensively on various topics in Economics and History, including textbooks and instructional aids as well as scholarly volumes and one novel based on his experiences in World War II.

=== Partial bibliography ===
The following is only a sampling of Phelps Brown's many books and articles.

==== Journal articles ====
- Phelps Brown, Henry; Hopkins, Sheila V. (August 1955). "Seven Centuries of Building Wages". Economica. 22 (87): 195. doi:10.2307/2626898. JSTOR 2626898.
- Phelps Brown, EH; Shackle, GLS (May 1939). "British Economic Fluctuations 1924–38". Oxford Economic Papers. 2 (2): 98–134. JSTOR 2663452.

==== Texts ====
- Phelps Brown, Henry (1949). The Framework of the Pricing System. University of Kansas.
- Phelps Brown, Henry (1951). A Course in Applied Economics. I. Pitman. OCLC 11634867.
- Phelps Brown, Henry (1959). The Growth of British Industrial Relations. Macmillan. ISBN 9780837177816.
- Phelps Brown, Henry (1962). The Economics of Labour. Macmillan.
- Phelps Brown, Henry (1968). A Century of Pay.
- Phelps Brown, Henry (1977). The Inequality of Pay. Oxford University Press.
- Phelps Brown, Henry (1983). The Origins of Trade Union Power. Clarendon Press.
- Phelps Brown, Henry (1988). Egalitarianism and the Generation of Inequality. Clarendon Press. ISBN 978-0-19-828648-6.

==== Fiction ====
- Phelps Brown, Henry (1953). The Balloon. MacMillan.

== Later life and death ==
Phelps Brown suffered a stroke in 1990. He died in December 1994.

== Personal ==
Phelps Brown married Dorothy Evelyn Mostyn Bowlby (daughter of surgeon Sir Anthony Bowlby, and sister of child psychologist John Bowlby) in 1932, and remained married to her until his death. They had three children.
