= The St Augustine of Canterbury School, Taunton =

The St Augustine of Canterbury School

Location
- Lyngford Road; Taunton, Somerset, TA2 7EF; England; 51.027922°N 3.094384°W

Information
- Type: Voluntary Aided Comprehensive
- Motto: Believing, Belonging, Becoming through Christ
- Religious affiliations: Joint Church of England and Roman Catholic
- Established: 28 May 1956
- Closed: July 2010
- Local authority: Somerset County Council
- Specialist: Science College
- Department for Education URN: 123898 Tables
- Head teacher: S Rowe
- Gender: Co-educational
- Age: 11 to 16
- Enrolment: 264
- Houses: Hodgkin, Stannard, Faraday, Burnell
- Colour: Black

The St Augustine of Canterbury School was a joint Church of England and Roman Catholic Voluntary Aided (VA) secondary school in Taunton, Somerset, England. It was established on 28 May 1956 and closed in July 2010.

It was a specialist Science College with 264 students between the ages of 11 and 16. The school closed in July 2010 and students merged into The Taunton Academy. At the time of its closure it had the lowest GCSE results in Somerset, and the eighth-lowest in England.

== History ==
=== Founding ===
The school was originally named Priorswood Secondary Modern School and opened on 28 May 1956 by the school's first headmaster, Arthur George Miller, with 258 children in attendance. When the school first opened no electric or gas supply was available, except to washing apparatus in the canteen kitchen. Heating was supplied by an oil fuelled boiler. The library, stage, gymnasium, domestic science, woodwork and metalwork rooms were incomplete and could not be used. However, the playground on the north side of the building was available for recreation. The facilities of the school were completed on 7 June 1956 allowing the school to function as normal.

=== Church involvement ===
In October 1977, Father Lynch and Preb. Roland Clark of the Diocesan Schools Commission began discussions with the LEA to consider a proposal for Priorswood Secondary Modern School to become a joint Roman Catholic and Anglican Church School. The proposal was to be submitted to the Secretary of State for Education and Science, Mark Carlisle, in 1980 with recommendation that the school be established in 1981.

On 11 December 1981, after the £750,000 joint venture by the government and churches had been agreed, the new school, to be established in September 1982, had been named. The school was to be known as St. Augustine of Canterbury, Priorswood, after the Bishop of the same name sent by Pope St. Gregory I on a mission to England in 595AD. On 27 August 1982, the school was established as one of the first in England to support both Anglican and Catholic faiths jointly.

By 2009, St Augustine had 274 pupils on roll against its capacity of 610, was in the lowest band for deprivation with 21.2% of pupils receiving free school meals against the local authority average of 7.9%, had 38% of pupils achieving five or more GCSE qualifications including English and Mathematics against the local authority average of 46.7% and national average of 47%, and for three years between 2006 and 2009 had set deficit budgets of between 8% and 14%.

== Closure ==
On 12 March 2009, it was announced that Jim Knight, Minister of State for Schools and Learners, had approved plans that would mean the closure of The St Augustine of Canterbury School. The school was replaced in September 2010 by The Taunton Academy, which took pupils from St. Augustine's as well as nearby Ladymead Community School, which also closed. The new academy initially opened across both site of the predecessor schools; however, it is now housed in a refurbished and extended campus on the site of the former Ladymead School.

== Future use ==
Following the introduction of Universal Infant Free School Meals, Somerset County Council created a production kitchen in the grounds of the former St Augustine campus. This is now able to produce over 2000 school meals per day for schools in the Taunton Deane area. The Local Authority have also consulted on relocating Selworthy Special School to the Lyngford Road site due to insufficient space at their current Selworthy Road site.
