= James Foster (Baptist minister) =

English Baptist minister

James Foster (6 September 1697 – 5 November 1753) was an English Baptist minister.

== Early life ==
Foster was born and baptized at Exeter, 6 September 1697. Most of our biographical knowledge of him comes from memoirs attached to a sermon preached at his funeral by his friend and colleague, Caleb Fleming. His grandfather had been a conformist minister at Kettering in Northamptonshire, and his father, James Foster, was a successful Devonshire dissenting businessman (a fuller). James the younger went to Thorpe's free school in Exeter from 1702, where he learned his Latin grammar; he then attended the Presbyterian Joseph Hallett II's academy for dissenting ministerial students, also in Exeter. There, he met other radicals, including Hubert Stogdon, and achieved a reputation for rejecting human authority in matters of religious controversy, belief, and practical piety, privileging what he believed to be the indubitable consequences of reason and argument over passive faith and received wisdom.

== Fall-out from the Exeter Controversy ==
In the late 1710s, a controversy over the nature of the Trinity broke out in Exeter, between Stogdon, Hallett and James Peirce on the one hand, and John Lavington, another Exeter minister, on the other. The Exeter Assembly of ministers, siding with Lavington and with the trustees of the Exeter dissenting meeting-houses, demanded that Peirce's supporters sign a declaration of faith and subscribe to a set of largely unambiguously orthodox doctrines. Foster, with Stogdon and other students at the Academy, was a non-subscriber. His decision contributed to his departure from Exeter. He moved shortly afterwards to Milborne Port, Somerset, where he preached to a sympathetic but still relatively orthodox congregation. Frustrated, he soon left Milborne to live in the Presbyterian minister Nicholas Billingsley's house, at Ashwick, near Shepton Mallet. Also a lodger with Billingsley was Hubert Stogdon; all three were considered heterodox. Foster and Stogdon then jointly served the chapels at Colesford and Wookey, near Wells, but both remained poor. Foster's combined salary amounted to only £15 a year and he considered learning a trade to supplement his income and enable him to continue his dissenting ministry. Apparently, his chief consideration was to become, like Billingsley, a glover. But at about this time, a gentleman in the region called Robert Houlton took him on as chaplain in his house, relieving his financial pressures.

== Other controversies ==
By this point, Foster was starting to publish controversial works on Christian doctrine. His Essay on Fundamentals showed the influence of Samuel Clarke's Scripture Doctrine, the work which had triggered the Exeter Controversy, and which Hallett's students, most notably Stogdon, had encountered and read secretly several years earlier. Like Clarke, Foster hinted at the non-essentiality of the doctrine of the Trinity; he argued that the fundamentals of the Christian faith should operate in a marriage between reasonable interpretation of natural and revealed religion. He also came to denounce infant baptism after reading John Gale's antipaedobaptist tracts; he believed it not to be sanctioned by scripture doctrine, and offered himself up to be re-baptized as an adult believer in London, perhaps by Gale himself. From 1724 Foster took over from Gale as co-minister with Joseph Burroughs at the General Baptist chapel in Paul's Alley, Barbican, London. By this point his Socinian leanings were well known; he and Burroughs were the only London ministers to invite the disgraced and formerly imprisoned Arian heretic Thomas Emlyn to preach. From 1728 Foster supplemented his ministry with the newly established Sunday evening lecture at the Old Jewry. By 1744 he succeeded Jeremiah Hunt as pastor of the Independent congregation at Pinner's Hall. Emlyn was not the only radical with which he had known sympathies. The rebellious Earl of Kilmarnock declared himself a presbyterian, and was given the sacrament whilst he was imprisoned in the Tower of London by Foster, who also attended his execution. Foster published an Account of Kilmarnock's behaviour in 1746, after which he was viciously attacked for Jacobitism, a claim which was far from the truth. Under the pressure of the sustained criticisms, his health began to fail.

== Support for Foster ==
Despite criticism from many orthodox Calvinists, Foster was becoming a celebrated preacher and academic, winning increasing recognition from many moderates within Protestant and Roman Catholic dissent, as well as from within the radical Deist wing of the Church of England. He was awarded the degree of Doctor of Divinity (DD) from the Marischal College in Aberdeen in December 1748 and was on several occasions offered livings in the conformist Church of Ireland by Bishop Thomas Rundle. Alexander Pope wrote in one of his Satires:

Let modest Foster, if he will, excel
Ten Metropolitans in preaching well.

He also attracted freethinkers and London wits to his Old Jewry meetings and was respected - though disliked - by the orthodox Congregationalist Philip Doddridge of Northampton. In the last part of his life, he probably lived with the mother of his friend Nehemiah Stokes in St Stephen, Coleman Street. He began to suffer a series of debilitating strokes between April 1750 and July 1753, but maintained his preaching as often as his health permitted. He died at Pinners' Hall, Middlesex, on 5 November 1753, and was buried in Bunhill Fields.

== Works ==
- The resurrection of Christ prov'd, 1720
- An essay on fundamentals, 1720, 1754, 1761
- The usefulness, truth, and excellency of the Christian revelation, 1731, 1734
- A sermon occasion'd by the death of Mrs. Mary Wilks, 1732
- Sermons on the following subjects, 1732, 1733, 1735, 1736, 1737, 1738, 1743, 1744, 1745, 1755
- An answer to Dr. Stebbing's letter on the subject of heresy, 1735, 1736, 1737
- An answer to Dr. Stebbing's True state of the controversy with Mr. Foster, 1737
- A sermon, preached at Barbican, on Sunday, August 16, 1741, 1741
- A sermon preached at White'-Alley, 1742
- An account of the behaviour of the late Earl of Kilmarnock, 1746 [Edin, London, Dublin, Belfast], 1747 [Boston]
- An account of the apparition of the late Lord Kilmarnock, 1747
- Discourses on all the principal branches of natural religion and social virtue, 1749–52, 1754
- Offices of devotion, suited to the principal branches of natural religion, 1754

== Other sources ==
- Stephen, Leslie (1889). "Foster, James" . In Stephen, Leslie (ed.). Dictionary of National Biography. Vol. 20. London: Smith, Elder & Co.
