= George Trosse =

English nonconformist minister

- Born: 25 October 1631; Exeter
- Died: 1713 (aged 81–82); Exeter
- Occupation: Nonconformist minister

George Trosse (25 October 1631 – 1713) was an English nonconformist minister. He is best known for his autobiographical accounts of periods of mental illness he experienced in his younger years.

== Early life ==
The younger son of Henry Trosse, counselor-at-law, he was born at Exeter on 25 October 1631; his mother was Rebekah, daughter of Walter Burrow, a prosperous merchant and twice mayor of Exeter. His family had no Puritan leanings; his uncle Roger Trosse (1595–1674), rector (1618) of Rose Ash, Devon, was one of the sequestered clergy of the English Civil War. Trosse was intended for the practice of law; his father, dying early, left him his law library; but on leaving Exeter grammar school Trosse went into business.

In 1646 Trosse was sent to an English merchant at Morlaix in Brittany, who placed him for a year with Ramet, a Huguenot pastor at Pontivy, to learn French. Returning to Exeter in 1648, he was sent to a brother-in-law in London for introduction to a Portugal merchant. Having been made free of the Drapers' Company, he sailed for Porto where he remained for two and a half years. He returned to Exeter early in 1651.

== Breakdown, recovery and Oxford ==
Three times Trosse's friends placed him under restraint with a physician at Glastonbury. Between his episodes he listened to Presbyterian preachers, became a communicant, and was especially drawn to Thomas Ford. After two relapses and an attempt at suicide, he experienced better mental health.

Supported by his mother, Trosse entered Pembroke College, Oxford as a gentleman commoner at the end of May 1657, where his tutor was Thomas Cheeseman, a blind scholar; among his contemporaries at Oxford was his kinsman Denis Grenville. He matriculated on 9 August 1658, spent seven full years at Oxford, acquired a fair amount of Greek and Hebrew knowledge, but took no degree in consequence of the required subscription to the 39 Articles.

== Minister ==
Meaning to enter the ministry, Trosse studied the question of conformity; his views were formed under the influence of Henry Hickman. Returning to Exeter in 1664, he attended church with his mother, but began to preach privately out of church hours. Robert Adkins, ejected from St. John's, Exeter, pressed him to receive ordination. He was ordained in Somerset (1666) by Joseph Alleine of Taunton, and five others, including Adkins. During the year (1672–1673) of Charles II's indulgence, he preached publicly in a licensed house. For conventicle preaching he was arrested with others on 5 October 1685 and imprisoned for six months. He declined to avail himself (1687) of James II's Declaration of Indulgence, though the Exeter dissenters built a meeting-house, James's Meeting, in that year for Joseph Hallett I.

On Hallett's death (14 March 1688–9) Trosse succeeded him, and from the passing of the Act of Toleration 1689 conducted services in church hours and took a stipend which (except in the year of indulgence) he had until then declined. His assistant was Joseph Hallett II. He took part in the formation in 1691 of a union of Devon ministers, on the London model. He remained active to the end of a long life; though ailing in health, he preached as usual on the morning of Sunday, 11 January 1713, and died soon after reaching home. He was buried on 13 January in St. Bartholomew's churchyard, Exeter; his funeral sermon was repeated to large audiences.

== Works ==
Trosse published, besides a sermon (1693) before the united ministers at Taunton:

- The Lord's Day Vindicated, 1682; in reply to Francis Bampfield; answered by Joseph Nott and by Edmund Elys, and defended in The Sauciness of a Seducer Rebuked, 1693
- A Discourse of Schism, 1701
- A Defence of ... Discourse of Schism, Exeter, 1702
- Mr. Trosse's Vindication ... from ... Aspersions, Exeter, 1709

The Exposition of the Assembly's Catechism, 1693, by John Flavel, was finished and edited by Trosse. In 1719, during the Exeter controversy around James Peirce, a catechism and sermon by Trosse were published in a pamphlet, and answered by Thomas Emlyn.

Trosse's autobiography to 1689 (finished 15 February 1693) was published (1714) as The Life of the Reverend Mr. Geo. Trosse Late Minister of the Gospel in the City of Exon, in accordance with his instructions to his widow in his will; a preface by Hallett, his assistant, defends the publication. He dwells on his drunkenness, lechery and masturbation. Attacks of mental illness recurred until he was about 26. He attributed the attacks, in part, to demonic possession. His work, in which theology is used to describe madness, has been considered the first such psychological account of an episode.

The autobiography was abridged in the Life by Isaac Gilling, who made use also of a further manuscript, and of correspondence. Gilling gives an elaborate account of Trosse's ministry.

== Family ==
Trosse married (1680) Susanna, daughter of Richard White, an Exeter merchant, who survived him, without issue.
