= Protestant dissenting deputies =

The Protestant dissenting deputies (also known as the Deputies of the Three Denominations of Dissenters) were a group in the 18th and 19th centuries in England, consisting of two representatives from each congregation of the dissenting denominations within ten miles of London. The 'three denominations' were Presbyterian, Independent and Baptist. The first formal meeting was in 1736 in Salters' Hall when Benjamin Avery was elected chairman.

Their main aim was protecting the civil rights of Dissenters (i.e. fighting against the several statutes passed after the Restoration that imposed civil and religious disabilities on non-Anglicans). They found support in the Whig party. They had a selected committee of twenty-one who met regularly at the King's Head Tavern on Poultry, London. The group, though technically representative of the London congregations, was, de facto, the representatives for dissenting bodies across the nation. They presented addresses to the Crown on behalf of all dissenters. They tended to support private influence over more public forms of protest.

Their support was a leading cause for the repeal of the Test and Corporation Acts in 1828.
