= Benjamin Avery =

English physician

Benjamin Avery, LL.D. (died 1764) was an English physician.

== Life ==
Avery was originally a Presbyterian minister at Bartholomew Close, London, but quit the ministry in 1720, in consequence of the Salters' Hall controversy on subscription, 1719. He practised as a physician, and was the Treasurer of Guy's Hospital. He retained the confidence of his Presbyterian brethren, and acted for 27 years as secretary to the Deputies of the Three Denominations of Dissenters, organised for the protection of the rights and redress of the grievances of the three denominations. He was a trustee of Dr. Williams's Library, 1728–64, and his portrait hangs in the library. He died 23 July 1764.

== Works ==
He showed himself a political and theological liberal in contributing to the Occasional Papers, collected in three volumes, 1716–19, sometimes called the 'Bagweell' papers. These are not to be confused with the 'Occasional Paper,' 1697–8, by Bishop Willis. Avery also conducted the Old Whig, or Consistent Protestant, a weekly publication, 13 March 1735 to 13 March 1738, his chief coadjutors being George Benson, Samuel Chandler, Benjamin Grosvenor, Caleb Fleming, J. Foster, and Micaiah Towgood; the collected issue, in two volumes, 1739, is not complete.

In 1728 Avery edited James Peirce's posthumous sermons and Scripture Catechism; he was probably the author of the Latin inscription prepared for Peirce's tomb. He was not concerned in the Independent Whig, 20 January 1720 to 4 January 1721, edited by Thomas Gordon (reissued 1732-5 and 1743).
