= Edward Wells (theologian) =

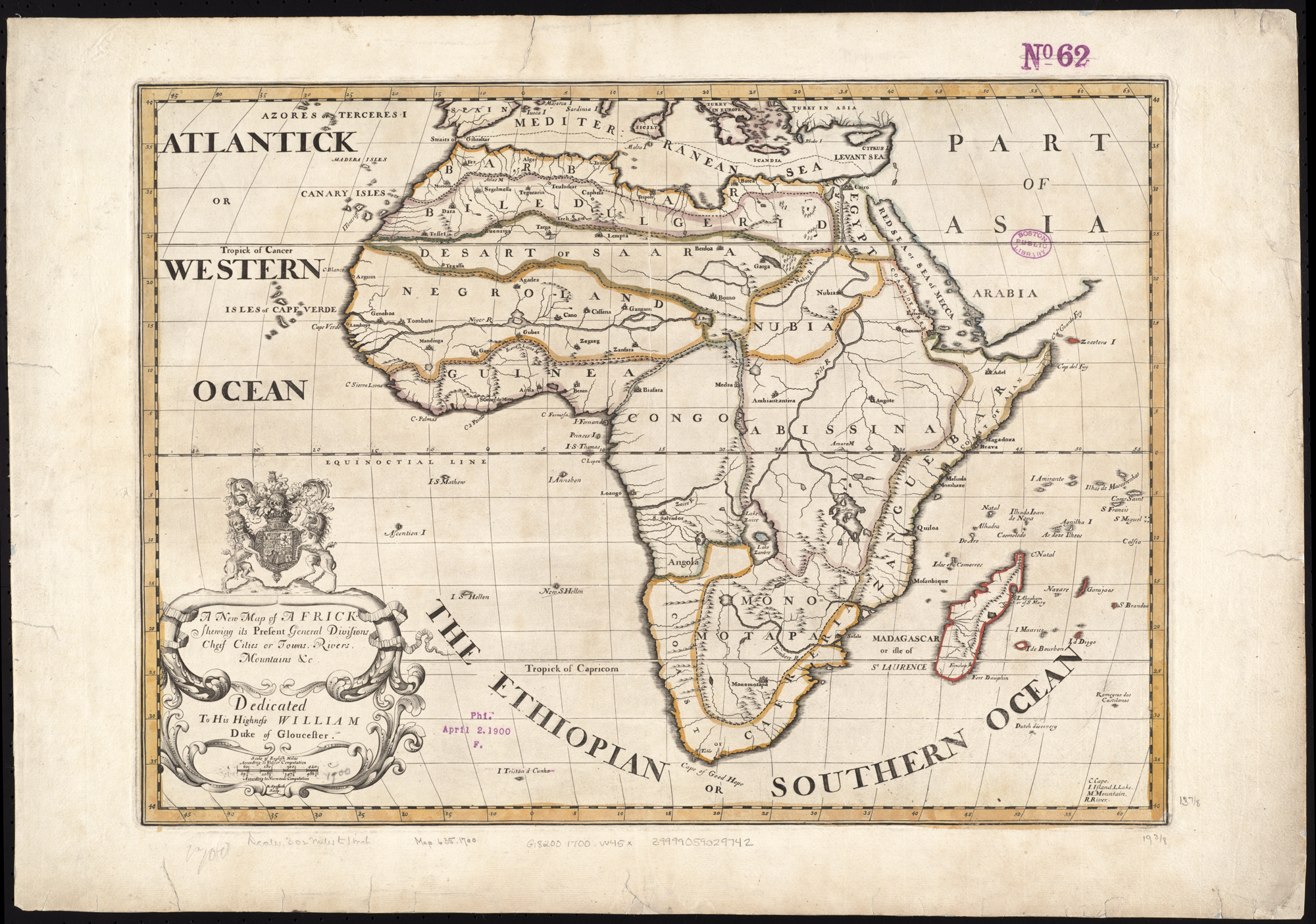
A 1700 map of Africa by Edward Wells

Edward Wells (1667–1727) was an English mathematician, geographer, and controversial theologian.

== Life ==
He was the son of Edward Wells, vicar of Corsham, Wiltshire. He was admitted to Westminster School in 1680, and elected to a scholarship at Christ Church, Oxford, in 1686. He graduated B.A. in 1690 and M.A. in 1693.

He was inducted to the rectory of Cotesbach, Leicestershire, on 2 January 1702, and he was awarded the degrees of B.D. and D.D. on 5 April 1704. On 28 March 1716 he was instituted to the rectory of Bletchley, Buckinghamshire, on the presentation of his former pupil, Browne Willis. From the pulpit he attacked his benefactor; Browne Willis then published Reflecting Sermons considered; occasioned by several Discourses delivered in the Parish Church of Bletchley.

From 1709 to 1719, Wells produced a Greek critical edition of the New Testament, published in Oxford. Wells drew from the variant readings collated in the edition of John Mill in the construction of the text. While Mill's edition had included the most thorough critical apparatus up to its time, the actual text was a reprint of that of Stephanus. Wells' edition was thus the first to offer the complete Greek New Testament while moving away from the Textus Receptus and toward what is now considered the standard critical text, Nestle-Aland.

Wells died on 11 July 1727, and was buried at Cotesbach.

== Works ==
Among his works are:

- An edition of Xenophon's 'Memorabilia' and 'Defence of Socrates,' Greek and Latin, Oxford, 1690.
- 'Elementa Arithmeticæ numerosæ et speciosæ,' Oxford, 1698.
- 'A Treatise of antient and present Geography, together with a sett of maps in folio,' Oxford, 1701; 4th edit. London, 1726; 5th edit. 1738.
- 'Tῆς πάλαι και τῆς νῦν Oἰκουμένης Περιήγησις, sive Dionysii Geographia emendata et locupletata, additione scilicet Geographiæ hodiernæ Græco Carmine pariter donatæ. Cum XVI Tabulis geographicis,' Oxford, 1704, 1709; London, 1718, 1726, 1738, 1761.
- 'Some Testimonies of the most eminent English Dissenters, as also of foreign reformed Churches and Divines, concerning the lawfulness of the Rites and Ceremonies of the Church of England, and the Unlawfulness of separating from it' (anon.), Oxford, 1706.
- 'The Invalidity of Presbyterian Ordination proved from the Presbyterians' own Doctrine of the Twofold Order; or a summary View of what has passed in controversy between Dr. Wells and Mr. Pierce … concerning the Invalidity of Presbyterian Ordination,' Oxford, 1707. Concerned with James Peirce.
- 'Treatises, designed for the use and benefit of his parishioners, dissenting as well as conforming,' Oxford, 1707, 8vo. These are six separately published tracts, with a collective title-page.
- 'Epistola ad Authorem anonymum Libelli non-ita pridem editi, cui Titulus 'Stricturæ breves in Epistolas D.D. Genevensium et Oxoniensium,' Oxford, 1608 [mistake for 1708].
- 'An historical Geography of the New Testament … adorned with maps; in two parts,' London, 1708; 2nd edit. 1712; 3rd edit. 1718; new edit. published by the Society for Promoting Christian Knowledge, 1835. vol. 1, vol. 2.
- 'An historical Geography of the Old Testament,' London, 1711–12, 3 vols.
- This, with the 'Geography of the New Testament,' was reprinted at Oxford in two volumes, 1801, and again in 1809.
- 'The Young Gentleman's Course of Mathematicks,' London, 1712–14, 3 vols.; vol. i. was reissued as 'The Young Gentleman's Arithmetick and Geometry,' 2nd edit. 2 parts, London, 1723; vol. ii. was reissued as 'The Young Gentleman's Astronomy, Chronology, and Dialling,' 3rd edit., with additions, London, 1725; 4th edit. 1736.
- 'Remarks on Dr. Clarke's Introduction to his Scripture-doctrine of the Trinity,' Oxford, 1713.
- 'A Paraphrase, with Annotations, on the New Testament; and the Book of Daniel,' London, 1714–19, 2 vols.
- 'The Rich Man's great and indispensable Duty to contribute liberally to the building, rebuilding, repairing, beautifying, and adorning of Churches,' 2nd edit. London, 1717; reprinted at Oxford, 1840, with an introduction by John Henry Newman.
- 'A Specimen of an Essay for to Find Out and Ascertain the True or Original Reading of the Hebrew Text, in All Places Where It Now Differs, Either from the Septuagint Version, or from the Samaritan Pentateuch' (1720), containing Propositions I-XVI and only select differences from Genesis I and II.
- 'Dialogue betwixt a Protestant Minister and a Romish Priest; wherein is shewed that the Church of Rome is not the only true Church; and that the Church of England is a sound part of the Catholick Church of Christ,' 3rd edit. London, 1723.
- 'An Help for the more easy and clear understanding of the Holy Scriptures,' being a Paraphrase, with Annotations, on the Old Testament, Oxford, 1724–7, 4 vols. This and the 'Paraphrase on the New Testament' contain, besides the paraphrase and annotations, discourses on subjects connected with the Scriptures. A detailed description of these discourses is given in Dr. Henry Cotton's list of editions of the Bible.
