= John Enty =

English Presbyterian minister (1675?–1743)

John Enty (1675?–1743) was an English Presbyterian minister. He became a leading figure in nonconformist circles in Exeter, after moves taken against ministers of unorthodox views in the years before 1720.

== Early life ==
Enty was the son of John Enty, a travelling tailor in Cornwall, was born in that county about 1675. The boy was working with his father at Tregothnan, the seat of the Boscawen family, when he attracted the notice of a Mrs Fortescue, who sent him to the Taunton Grammar School and thence to the Taunton Academy, under Matthew Warren. Fortified by a recommendation from Warren, he went to preach at Plymouth, some time after the death (15 May 1696) of Nicholas Sherwill, pastor of one of the two presbyterian congregations. Sherwill's place was filled for a short time by his assistant, Byfield, who, according to John Fox (1693–1763), 'had the best sense and parts of any dissenter that ever lived' in Plymouth. The congregation, however, set aside Byfield and chose Enty, as 'a bright and serious young man.' He was ordained at Plymouth on 11 May 1698. Fox disparages his talents, but admits his power of moving the passions and the charm of his musical voice. In 1708 his congregation, numbering five hundred persons, built for him a new place of worship in Batter Street. He married well, and thus acquired means and position.

== Conservative party ==
In the assembly of united ministers, which met half-yearly at Exeter, Enty sided with the conservative party, and eventually became its leader. He was rather a martinet, and haughty to opponents, but put his friends at ease by the frankness of a simple and kindly nature. He kept an eye on the orthodoxy of candidates for the ministry, but was not a prime mover against James Peirce, the Exeter heretic. After the exclusion of Peirce (1719) Enty was chosen (1720) his successor at James's Meeting. He was succeeded at Plymouth by Peter Baron, who had assisted him from 1700, and was ordained his colleague on 19 July 1704.

== Exeter Enty spokesman ==
At Exeter Enty became the presiding spirit of the assembly, and its authorised spokesman in the controversy which followed the exclusion of Peirce. His steady adherence to his principles established him in reputation and honour throughout the twenty-three years of his Exeter ministry. He was little of a pastor, confining himself to pulpit duty, taking no exercise, and caring for no amusements. His health remained good till, in May 1743, his constitution was broken by an epidemic. He died on 26 November 1743.

== Personal life ==
Enty was twice married: first, to 'an agreeable woman' of good fortune at Kingsbridge, Devonshire, who died childless. Very soon after her death his old friend, Mrs. Vincent, whose house at Plymouth was 'the great inn for all dissenting ministers,’ made up a match between him and Ann, eldest daughter of Savery of Shilston, near Modbury, Devonshire, a dissenting family of county rank.

== Works ==
Enty wrote:

- The Ministry secured from Contempt, 1707 (sermon, on Tit. ii. 15, to the Exeter assembly)
- A Defence of the Proceedings of the Assembly at Exeter, 1719 (in reply to Peirce)
- Truth and Liberty consistent, 1720 (a further defence, in reply to Peirce's rejoinder)
- A Preservative against … corruptions of Reveal'd Religion, Exon, 1730.
- A Defense of … a Preservative, 1730.

Also single sermons from 1716, 1717, 1725 and 1727.
