= John Palmer (Unitarian, 1729?–1790) =

English Unitarian minister

John Palmer (1729?–1790) was an English Unitarian minister.

== Life ==
He was born about 1729 in Southwark, where his father was an undertaker. His parents were independents, and he was educated for the congregational ministry, under David Jennings, D.D.

In 1755 he became assistant to John Allen M.D. (d. 31 December 1774, aged 72), Presbyterian minister at New Broad Street, London. When Allen moved (1759) to Worcester, Palmer became pastor. The congregation declined, and ceased in 1772 to contribute to the Presbyterian fund. On the expiry of the lease of the meeting-house (1780) the congregation was dissolved, and Palmer left the ministry.

From 1768 he was a trustee of Dr. Daniel Williams's foundations. After 1780 he lived in retirement at Islington, where he died on 26 June 1790, aged 61. He married a wealthy lady.

== Views ==
He defended free will against Joseph Priestley. His religious views coincided with those of his friend, Caleb Fleming.

== Works ==
He published, in addition to funeral sermons for George II (1760) and Caleb Fleming (1779), and a funeral oration for Timothy Laugher (1769):

- 'Prayers for the use of Families,' &c, 1773; 2nd edit. 1785.
- 'Free Thoughts on the Inconsistency; of conforming to any Religions Test as a Condition of Toleration,' &c., 1779.
- 'Observations in Defence of the Liberty of Man as a Moral Agent,' &c., 1779.
- 'An Appendix to the Observations,' &c, 1780.
- 'A Summary View of the Grounds of Christian Baptism,' &c., 1788, (defence of infant baptism).

He edited (1766) the posthumous commentaries of John Alexander.
