= Isaac Gilling =

English Presbyterian minister

Isaac Gilling (c. 1662, Stogumber, Somersetshire – 1725) was an English Presbyterian minister.

== Youth and education ==
Gilling was the elder son of Richard Gilling, baker, was born at Stogumber, Somersetshire. He was educated at a nonconformist academy in Taunton, maintained (1678–85) by George Hamond, an ejected minister. John Fox, his relative and biographer, says that when Gilling began to preach ‘he preached often in the churches, though he was never a regular conformist.’

== Career ==
He received presbyterian ordination at Lyme Regis, Dorsetshire, on 25 August 1687, being at that time ‘curate of Barrington and Seavington St. Mary in Somerset.’ His next employment was at Axminster, Devonshire, as usher in a Latin school; while here he preached to a congregation of independents. He then became pastor of the presbyterian congregation at Silverton, Devonshire. Here he married a lady (from Brampford-Speke) ‘somewhat deformed,’ but of good estate. From Silverton he was called to the charge of the presbyterian congregation at Newton Abbot, Devonshire, in succession to William Yeo, an ejected minister who died in 1699.

Gilling, who was a scholarly and genial divine, kept a flourishing boarding-school at Newton Abbot, and got into trouble during the reign of Anne for doing so without the bishop's license. He was more than once obliged to abscond to prevent arrest, the last occasion being in 1712, when (in a disguise) he accompanied Fox to London. In ecclesiastical politics he was for a consolidation of the dissenting interest, and was an active member of the Exeter assembly, formed in 1691 as a union of presbyterians and independents on the London model. Of this body he was for many years the scribe; his quarto volume of manuscript minutes (to 1718) is preserved in Dr. Williams's library. In the disputes of 1719 he sided with the minority against subscription, and hence was excluded from the assembly and deserted by more than half his hearers, who formed a new congregation under Samuel Westcot. Other disappointments followed; Gilling lost heart, fell into a lingering sickness, and died on 20 or 21 August 1725. His age is not given, but the date of his ordination shows that he could not have been born later than 1662. He was buried in his meeting-house. He had wished to be interred in the church or churchyard at Newton Abbot, but the parish being a peculiar, the ordinary, Sir William Courtenay, refused to permit the interment, saying ‘they might bury him in one of the marshes.’

== Family ==
By his first wife Gilling had a son Isaac, educated as a physician at Paris and entered at Leiden University on 4 October 1723, who did not turn out well, and a daughter, married to John Fox. His second wife, née Atkins, of Exeter, led him into extravagances.

== Bibliography ==
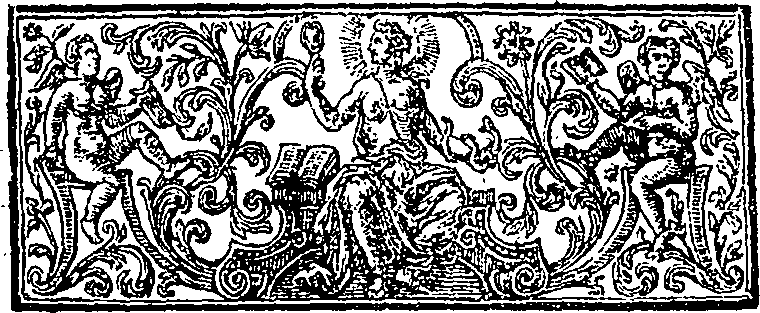
Fleuron from The Mischief of Uncharitable Judging

Gilling published: A Sermon Preach'd At Lyme Regis in the County of Dorset At A Quarterly Lecture Appointed For The Promoting the Reformation of manners. printed by S Farley, Exeter and to be sold by Philip Bishop & John Lawrence, London. 1705.

- The Qualifications and Duties of Ministers, Exeter, 1708,
- The Life of the Reverend Mr. George Trosse, 1715, (an abridgment and continuation of George Trosse's very singular autobiography, originally published at Exeter, 1714, by Joseph Hallett, but superseded by Gilling's more decorous narrative, ‘one of the best pieces of evangelical biography’).
- The Mischief of Uncharitable Judging, Exeter, 1719,

Gilling also published funeral sermons for the Reverend S. Atkins, 1702, Samuel Atkins, June 1703, Susanna Reynell, 1704, and the Reverend S. Mullins, 1711. He prepared for the press the papers of Walter Moyle. While practising at Exeter, Gilling was the intimate friend of antiquary William Musgrave, of that city, to whom he rendered important assistance in the preparation of his great work, the Antiquitates Britanno-Belgicræ.
