= John Alexander (Presbyterian minister) =

- Born: 30 September 1686; Temple Patrick, County Antrim
- Died: 1 November 1743 (aged 57); Dublin

John Alexander (30 September 1686 – 1 November 1743) was an Irish Presbyterian minister.

== Life ==
He was a native of Ulster, but connected with the Scottish noble family of the Alexanders, earls of Stirling, being the grandson of the first earl. He was educated at Glasgow, and settled in England. Wilson identifies him with the John Alexander who was a pupil of Isaac Noble and Congregationalist minister at Gloucester 1712–18. He was Presbyterian minister at Stratford-on-Avon, where he educated students for the ministry.

He afterwards moved to Dublin, where he was installed minister of Plunket Street Presbyterian congregation on 15 November 1730. He was moderator of the General Synod of Ulster, 1734, and died in Dublin on 1 November 1743 and was buried there. His family moved to Birmingham.

== Works ==
He was a linguist and patristic scholar; he published The Primitive Doctrine of Christ's Divinity … in an Essay on Irenæus … 1727.

== Family ==
He married Hannah Higgs (1704/5–1768), daughter of Rev. John Higgs of Evesham, on 8 August 1732. He left two daughters Mary (1734), Hannah (1742) and two sons, John and Benjamin (1737–1768): the latter, was a doctor of medicine, and translated J. B. Morgagni's De Sedibus (The Seats and Causes of Disease, investigated by Anatomy, 1769). (Note: Funeral Sermon by Rev. Robert Macmaster, 1743) (Note: Thomas Witherow, Historical and Literary Memorials of Presbyterianism in Ireland, first series, 1879) (Note: Wilson's manuscripts at Dr. Williams's Library) (Note: Monthly Repository 1816, page 93.)
