= Caleb Fleming =

English dissenting minister and polemicist (1698–1779)

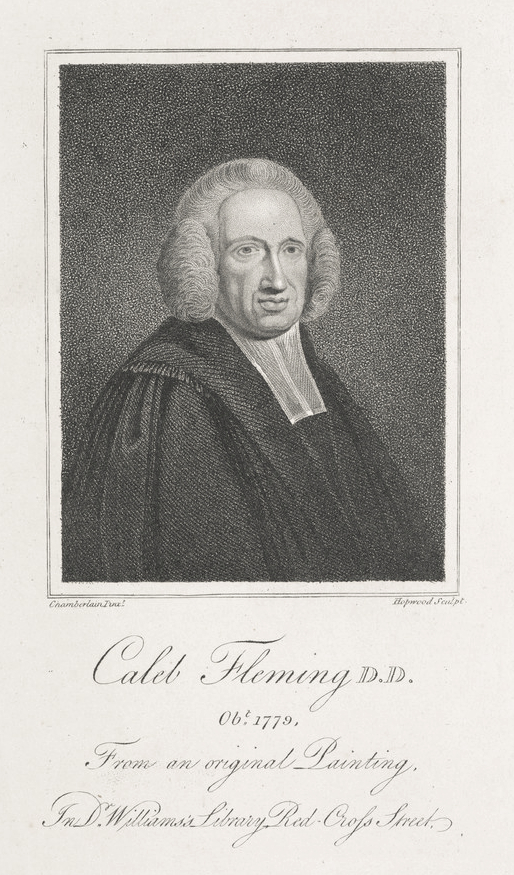
Caleb Fleming

Caleb Fleming, D.D. (4 November 1698 – 21 July 1779) was an English dissenting minister and polemicist.

== Life ==
Fleming was born at Nottinghamshire on 4 November 1698. His father was a hosier; his mother, whose maiden name was Buxton, was a daughter of the lord of the manor of Chelmerton, Derbyshire. Brought up in Calvinism, Fleming's early inclination was for the independent ministry. As a boy he learned shorthand, in order to take down sermons. In 1714 John Hardy became one of the ministers of the presbyterian congregation at the High Pavement Chapel, Nottinghamshire, and opened a nonconformist academy. Fleming was one of his first pupils. He was admitted as a communicant in 1715. Hardy (who conformed in 1727) taught him to discard his inheritance in theology. He gave up the idea of the ministry and took to business, retaining, however, his theological tastes.

In 1727 he left Nottingham for London. By this time he had married and had a family. How he maintained himself is not clear. He began to publish pamphlets which attracted some attention, but remained poor.

In 1727 a Catholic tried to make a convert of him, but desisted on discovering that he had to deal with an anti-trinitarian. Some help in further classical and biblical study was given to him by John Holt, then a presbyterian minister in London, later mathematical tutor at Warrington Academy, and he learned Hebrew from a rabbi. Through William Harris, D.D., presbyterian minister at Crutched Friars, an offer was made for his services as a government pamphleteer. He replied that he "would sooner cut off his right hand."

In 1736 he published a pamphlet, The Fourth Commandment abrogated by the Gospel, dedicating it to his namesake, Sir George Fleming, bishop of Carlisle. It would appear that he had been advised to do this by John Thomas, afterwards bishop of Winchester. Bishop Fleming offered him the living of Lazonby, Cumberland, worth some £600 a year. Dr. Thomas was ready to advance what was needed for his move, but Fleming could not conform. In his refusal, he was supported by his wife.

His friends now began to urge him to enter the dissenting ministry. In his fortieth year he preached his first sermon to the presbyterian congregation at Wokingham, Berkshire, Catcot, the minister, publicly thanking him for his services. After this he officiated at a few places in the neighbourhood of London. At length, on the death of John Munckley (August 1738), he was strongly recommended by Benjamin Avery as a suitable candidate for the charge of the presbyterian congregation at Bartholomew Close. There, Fleming and William May were ordained as joint pastors in 1740.

Fleming had scruples about presbyterian forms, and classed himself as an independent. At his ordination, conducted by Samuel Chandler, Jeremiah Hunt, and others, he refused to submit to the imposition of hands, His confession of faith was unique. He would only say that he believed the New Testament contained "a revelation worthy of God to give and of man to receive;" and this he promised to teach in the sense in which he should "from time to time" understand it. It was soon rumoured that Fleming was a Socinian. His congregation was never large, and the scantiness of his stipend reduced him to dire financial straits. His friends fell off, with the exception of Jeremiah Hunt. After Hunt's death (1744) Fleming was on good terms with Nathaniel Lardner, D.D., his neighbour in Hoxton Square, and co-operated with him in literary work.

In January 1752 James Foster, became disabled from preaching. John Weatherley (d. May 1752), a General Baptist minister, who supplied Foster's place, met Fleming at Hamlin's Coffee-house, and engaged him for a Sunday at Pinners' Hall, an Independent congregation. He attracted the notice of Timothy Hollis, was soon afterwards elected as Foster's assistant, and on Foster's death (5 November 1753) as pastor. The Bartholomew Close congregation then came to an end, its few remaining members joining Pinners' Hall.

For nearly a quarter of a century Fleming remained at his post; his ministry, though painstaking, was not popular, and when he ceased to preach, in December 1777, his congregation became extinct, the lease of their meeting-house expiring in 1778. He had admirers, who left him considerable legacies, among them being a bequest by a Suffolk gentleman (Reynolds), who had once heard him preach but did not know his name. A wealthy widow placed her whole fortune at his disposal. Fleming, however, declined to be enriched at the expense of her needy relatives.

In his old age his friend William Dalrymple of Ayr procured for him the degree of D.D. from St. Andrews. Fleming was inclined to reject this "compliment"; but his friend Thomas Hollis "put it into the public papers",’ so Fleming accepted it in a letter (6 April 1769).

After completing his seventy-ninth year, Fleming retired. He died on 21 July 1779, and was buried in Bunhill Fields. He left an epitaph for his gravestone, in which he describes himself as "dissenting teacher", and expresses a conditional hope of immortality. For this, however, was substituted a eulogistic inscription by Joseph Towers, LL.D. His funeral sermon was preached by John Palmer at New Broad Street. A portrait of Fleming, by William Chamberlain, was bequeathed by him to Dr. Williams's Library.

== Works ==
Fleming's major work is A Survey of the Search after Souls, 1758, dedicated to Nicolas Munckley, M.D. The title and topic were suggested by the writings of William Coward. To prove, against Coward, the existence of a separate soul, Fleming employs the arguments of Samuel Clarke, and especially of Andrew Baxter (metaphysician). He does not contend that the soul is inherently immortal, but simply that it possesses a "capacity of immortality". His view of the resurrection was adopted by John Cameron (1724–1799).

Fleming was an unwearied writer of argumentative and combative pamphlets, the greater part of them being anonymous. His political brochures, in defence of civil liberty and against the Jacobites, church establishments, and the toleration of popery, are tart enough. Against the theological writers of his time, high and low, he entered the field with confident vigour. He attacked Thomas Sherlock, Soame Jenyns, John Wesley, the Sabbatarians as represented by Robert Cornthwaite, and the Muggletonians. His most severe, and perhaps his best remembered, publication is his "character" of Thomas Bradbury, "taken from his own pen".

The topics to which he most frequently recurred were the defence of infant baptism and of the authority of the New Testament against the deists, especially Thomas Chubb, whom he is said to have impressed. His own theology, as may be seen in his True Deism, the Basis of Christianity, 1749, was little more than a specially authenticated deism. He retains the "supernatural conception", minimised after a fashion of his own, and the miracles of Christ, which "did not introduce a single unnatural phenomenon", but "removed defects in nature" (True Deism, p. 14). In a manuscript sermon (10 October 1773) he ranks Confucius, Socrates, Plato, Cicero, and Seneca among organs of divine revelation. Many of his pamphlets and sermons attempt to deal with the problem of a general depravity of morals. Under the title of A Modern Plan, 1748, he drew up "a compendium of moral institutes", in the shape of a catechism in which the learner asks the questions.

Walter Wilson enumerates 60 of Fleming's publications. The following are not included in Wilson's list. Most of them will be found in Dr. Williams's Library, Grafton Street, W.C.; others are from a collection formed by Fleming's nephew:

- The Parent Disinherited by his Offspring, 1728.
- Observations on Some Articles of the Muggletonians' Creed, 1735. Answered in The Principles of the Muggletonians, 1735, by A. B., i.e. Arden Bonell.
- An Appeal to the People of England, [1739].
- The Challenge ... on ... Baptism, 1743.
- A Fine Picture of Enthusiasm, 1744.
- A Letter to the Rev. Charles Willats upon his Assize Sermon, 1744.
- Remarks upon the Life of John Duke of Argyle, 1745.
- Tracts on Baptism, 1745 (a collection of six previous pieces, with an introduction).
- A Fund raising for the Italian Gentleman, 1750 (the reference is to the Young Pretender).
- The Devout Laugh, 1750.
- Natural and Revealed Religion at Variance, 1758 (against Thomas Sherlock).
- A Letter to the Rev. John Stevens, 1760.
- The Pædo-Baptist's sense of Positive Institutions, n.d.
- Grammatical Observations on the English Language, 1765.
- A few Strictures relative to the Author, prefixed to An Enquiry, &c., 1776, by Paul Cardale.
- Two Discourses, 1778.

Some of Cardale's anonymous pieces have sometimes been ascribed to Fleming. He edited many works by divines and others, including the first volume (1756) of Thomas Amory's Life of John Buncle.

== Family ==
Fleming married a daughter of John Harris of Hardstoft, Derbyshire, and had ten children, of whom one survived him.
