= John Fox (biographer) =

English biographer

- Born: 10 May 1693; Plymouth, Devon, England
- Died: 25 October 1763 (aged 70)
- Children: 1 daughter

John Fox (10 May 1693 – 25 October 1763) was an English biographer.

== Life ==
=== Youth and education ===
Fox was born in Plymouth. His father, a zealous presbyterian, 'devoted' him 'to the ministry, from an infant.' His mother was the daughter of a Plymouth tradesman named Brett. After an education at Tavistock Grammar School, and under 'old Mr. Bedford' at Plymouth, he read the Greek Testament and Virgil for a few months with Nicodemus Harding, son of Nathaniel Harding, independent minister at Plymouth. The two young men were preparing for entrance at the Exeter academy, under Joseph Hallet II. In May 1708, he entered the academy, where he soon quarrelled with Harding, and formed an intimacy with his tutor's son, Joseph Hallet III, who put doubts into his mind respecting the Trinity.

=== Early career ===
When he left the academy in 1711, he had 'no great disposition of being a minister.' His reluctance to comply with the Toleration Act, by subscribing the doctrinal articles, produced a coolness with his father. After some months, Isaac Gilling, minister at Newton Abbot, Devonshire, came to Plymouth in disguise; a process was out against him for illegally keeping a Latin school. He was a first cousin of the elder Fox, who allowed his son to accompany Gilling on his flight from Devonshire, on a promise that Gilling would do all in his power to remove young Fox's aversion to the ministry. At Salisbury Fox was introduced to Sir Peter King, then recorder of London, an old friend of Gilling. Arrived in London, he slipped out of Gilling's hands, and stayed with another relative. He was not favourably impressed with John Shower, the only London minister he met, and spent his time in getting glimpses of great people and visiting the theatres. At the end of a fortnight in town, Gilling was able to return to Newton Abbot, and took Fox with him. The accidental sight of a letter from his father to Gilling 'determined [him] to be a minister at all events.' With this view he remained with Gilling three-quarters of a year (1712–13), the pleasantest part of his life. Gilling directed his studies, and he fell in love with Gilling's daughter. In May 1713 Edmund Calamy, D.D., visited the west of England, and, hearing of Fox's scruples, made him easy by telling him confidentially that he himself had never subscribed, and that if Fox 'kept himself to himself' the omission would never be suspected.

=== Stay in London ===
In October 1714, Fox went to London, where he remained until April 1716. He lodged with four young ministers in Austin Friars; it is probable that he attended the classes of John Eames He became intimate with Thomas Secker and Samuel Chandler (who lived in Calamy's house); to both of whom, and especially to Secker (who kept up a correspondence with him till 1718), he ascribes his progress in freedom of opinion. His father wished him to be licensed as a preacher before he returned to Plymouth. This implied an examination, from which he shrank. After interviews with Williams and Calamy, he abandoned the idea of passing his trials in London. His friend Jeremy Burroughs (a young minister who afterwards became collector of the customs at Bristol) came to his relief, by advising him simply to take the oath of allegiance, as if he had been licensed. He chose a time when, in consequence of the rebellion of 1745, all ministers were ordered to take the oath afresh. As he was signing his name in the court of exchequer with the rest, Calamy 'looked very hard at' his rather advanced pupil.

=== Return to Plymouth ===
Returning to Plymouth, it occurred to Fox that he was not yet a communicant. Harding admitted him without question, but at once guessed that he had not been licensed. He preached his first sermon at Chulmleigh, Devonshire, whereupon there was 'a whispering and grumbling among the ministers,' who suspected him of being an intruder. He preached elsewhere, but soon found that without a licence the Exeter assembly would not recognise him. Accordingly, he applied for leave to choose his own examiners. After some manœuvring between parties in the assembly, he got what he wanted, dealt cleverly with the test questions, and was licensed on 17 October 1717. In the assembly of May 1719 he threw in his lot with James Peirce, the leader of the heterodox party, and the result was that he got no preaching engagements except to 'the poor remains of a few broken congregations.' It does not appear that he was ever ordained.

On 12 May 1723 his father died, and Fox at once abandoned the ministry. He was now master of 'a humble competence,' which enabled him to marry (23 Dec 1723) Miss Gilling (b. 11 December 1695); and henceforth he lived in obscure comfort, 'between the sunshine of life and the clouds and darkness of it.' His health was good, and he took pleasure in his books and the society of a few friends. In 1736, he writes to Secker that for some years past he had conformed 'out of regard to public peace and … respect to the public.' The ailments of his wife, to whom he was strongly attached, were his only trouble. On her death, 19 December 1762, he lost heart. He died on 25 October (according to Hazlitt 22 October) 1763, aged 70. A daughter, Mary (born 26 December 1725), married John Cleather, 3 September 1747.

== Works ==
It was some time after 1744 that Fox penned his own Memoirs, and the Characters of some of his contemporaries. They throw light on dissenting history. Fox writes with freedom, though his estimates of men were coloured by his dislikes. In 1814, some use was made of the 'Characters' by Joshua Toulmin, to whom the manuscript had been lent by Fox's grandson, George Cleather of Stonehouse, near Plymouth; Toulmin had evidently not seen the 'Memoirs.' In 1821 the 'Memoirs' and nine 'Characters' were published in the 'Monthly Repository,' with nine letters from Secker to Fox, one from Fox to Secker, and two from Chandler to Fox. Notes were added by John Towill Rutt. The editor, Robert Aspland, speaks of the manuscripts as having come into his possession through a descendant of Fox. Aspland thought of reprinting the papers, and promised to deposit the originals in Dr. Williams's Library; unfortunately neither intention was carried out. In 1822 an additional letter from Fox to Secker was supplied by Clifford, of the Theatre Royal, Norwich, who reported that he possessed other memoirs by Fox. Northcote's transcript of Fox's papers (containing some addition to the 'Memoirs') is now in the public library at Plymouth.
