= John Alexander (nonconformist minister) =

British nonconformist minister and writer

John Alexander (1736 – 29 December 1765) was a British nonconformist minister and writer.

== Life ==
He was born in Dublin in 1736, where his father John Alexander, a minister and dissenting tutor at Stratford-upon-Avon, had moved; on the father's death, the widow and family returned to England. After grammar school, John was sent to Daventry Academy, and was afterwards put under the tuition of Dr. George Benson; Benson sometimes took young students under his care, after they had finished their university or academical education, for the purpose of instructing them in a more critical acquaintance with the sacred writings. He afterwards entered the ministry, which he exercised in and near Birmingham, but principally at a small village called Longdon, about twelve miles from that place. On Saturday, 23 December 1765, he returned to rest, in perfect health, between eleven and twelve o'clock, intending to officiate at Longdon next day: but at six in the morning he was found dead in his bed.

== Works ==
After his death John Palmer published a work of his, entitled A Paraphrase upon the 15th chapter of the first epistle to the Corinthians; with critical notes and observations, and a Preliminary Dissertation, a Commentary, with critical Remarks, upon the 6th, 7th, and part of the 8th chapters to the Romans. To which is added, A Sermon on Ecclesiastes ix. 10. composed by the author the day preceding his death, London 1766. He wrote also in The Library, the monthly publication run by Andrew Kippis. There Alexander wrote an ironic Defence of persecution, essays on Dullness, Common Sense, Misanthropy, the Study of Man, Controversy, the Misconduct of Parents, Modern Authorship, the present state of Wit in Great Britain, the Index of the Mind, and the Fate of periodical productions.

== Family ==
He had a brother, Dr. Benjamin Alexander, a physician in London, who died young, in 1768, and was the translator of Morgagni's De sedibus et causis morborum, 3 volumes, London 1769.
