= Francis Holcroft =

English ejected minister

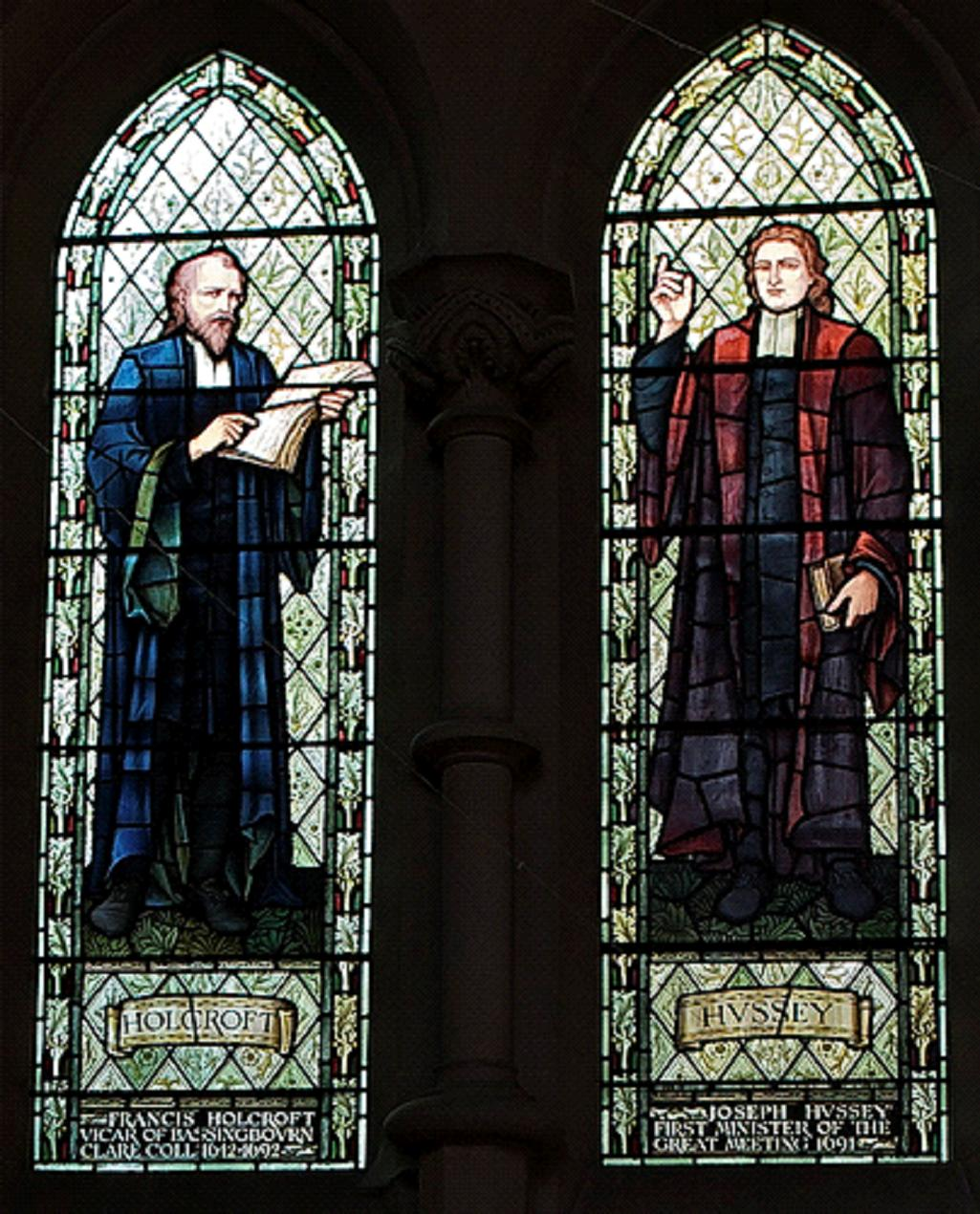
Stained-glass windows of 1905 by Morris & Co. of Francis Holcroft (left) and Joseph Hussey in the former Emmanuel Congregational Church, Cambridge

Francis Holcroft (1629?–1693) was an English ejected minister.

== Life ==
He was son of Sir Henry Holcroft, born at West Ham in Essex. He matriculated at Clare Hall, Cambridge in 1647. John Tillotson was his chamber-fellow about 1650. While at Cambridge he embraced puritan principles, and became a communicant with the congregation of Jonathan Jephcott at Swaffham Prior. He graduated M.A. in 1654, was elected fellow of his college, and took holy orders.

For some years he voluntarily supplied the parish of Litlington, Cambridgeshire. About 1655 he accepted the living of Bassingbourn, Cambridgeshire, where he was a successful preacher, and, was assisted by the Rev. Joseph Oddy, fellow of Trinity College, Cambridge. Holcroft eventually formed a church on congregational principles, and, after being ejected in 1662 from Bassingbourn, became a bitter opponent of episcopalianism. After his ejection, he brought his former parishioners into congregations at convenient centres, and acted as their minister, with the assistance of Oddy and S. Corbyn, both ejected fellows of Trinity College, Cambridge, who were appointed at a general meeting at Eversden.

In 1663 Holcroft was imprisoned in Cambridge gaol, by order of Thomas Chicheley, for illegal preaching, but he was occasionally allowed by the warder to visit his congregations. At the assizes he was sentenced to abjure the realm, but on Arthur Annesley, 1st Earl of Anglesey representing his case to Charles II he was allowed to remain in gaol. He was released at the Declaration of Indulgence in 1672, returned to his preaching, and was again imprisoned. By means of a writ of certiorari he was removed as an insolvent debtor to the Fleet Prison in London, and frequently preached there to large crowds of people. On discharging his debts he was released.

During both these imprisonments he experienced support from Tillotson. Until 1689 Holcroft took general charge of a number of congregations in Cambridgeshire and the adjoining counties. Soon after 1689 his health gave way, and he became a prey to depression. His organization quickly came to grief, and he died on 6 January 1693 at Thriplow, Cambridgeshire, where he was buried. He left a small estate to the poor of his congregations, and a piece of ground at Oakington for a burial-place. Edmund Calamy stated that there was scarcely a village in Cambridgeshire in which Holcroft did not preach.

== Works ==
He wrote a tract called "A Word to the Saints from the Watch Tower", 1688. It appears to have been written while he was in Cambridge gaol.
