= Robert Adkins =

Robert Adkins (1626 – 28 March 1685) (occasionally Atkins) was one of the most notable of the two thousand ejected ministers of 1662.

== Biography ==
Adkins was born at Chard, Somerset, in 1626. His father intended to put him into business, but, discovering that his heart was set upon being a preacher of the gospel, he sent him to Oxford. He entered Wadham College, of which he became ultimately a fellow. He had for tutor the afterwards famous Bishop Wilkins. When Adkins 'first appeared in the pulpit at St. Mary's, Oxford, being but young and looking younger than he was, from the smallness of his stature, the hearers despised him, expecting nothing worth hearing from "such a boy," as they called him. But his discourse soon turned their contempt into admiration.. Cromwell appointed him one of his chaplains. But, like Richard Baxter, he found the place unsuitable 'by reason of the insolency of the sectaries.'

He resettled at Theydon as the successor of John Feriby and the predecessor of Francis Chandler and his ministry here extended from 1652–3 to 1657. His health having given way, he removed to Exeter, at the instance of Thomas Ford, then minister of Exeter Cathedral. Here he first preached in the parish church of St. Sidwell, while the choir of the cathedral was being prepared for him. When the alterations were completed, the choir, commonly known as East Peter's Church, was capable of accommodating a vast congregation.. He was regarded as one of the best preachers in the west of England at the time. He was ejected from St. Peter's under the Restoring of Ministers Act 1660 (12 Cha. 2. c. 17), but was immediately chosen to St. John's in the same city, which was then vacant. When the Act of Uniformity came, he was for a second time ejected from St. John's.

In his farewell sermon, preached 17 August 1662, Adkins said:

Let him never be accounted a sound christian that doth not fear God and honour the king. I beg that you would not suffer our nonconformity, for which we patiently bear the loss of our places, to be an act of unpeaceableness and disloyalty. We will do anything for his majesty but sin. We will hazard anything for him but our souls. We hope we could die for him, only we dare not be damned for him. We make no question, however we may be accounted of here, we shall be found loyal and obedient subjects at our appearance before God's tribunal.

Robert Adkins remained in Exeter after his ejection and died there on 28 March 1685, aged 59. His funeral sermon was preached by George Trosse and published in his The Sin and Danger of Popery, in six sermons (1712) and his Farewell Sermon at St. John's (1715).
