= Joseph Hallett II =

English nonconformist minister and dissenting academy tutor

Joseph Hallett II (1656–1722) was an English nonconformist minister and dissenting academy tutor.

== Life ==
=== Early career ===
The son of Joseph Hallett I (1628?–1689), he was born and baptised on 4 November 1656. He was probably educated by his father, was ordained in 1683, and on the erection of James' Meeting (1687), the meeting-house in Exeter was appointed his father's assistant. He had a similar post under George Trosse, his father's successor, and on Trosse's death (11 January 1713) became pastor. Towards the end of the year James Peirce became his colleague.

Hallett ran in Exeter a nonconformist academy, which became noted as a nursery of unorthodox theological views. Its opening has been dated as early as 1690; it had a well-established reputation when John Fox entered it in May 1708.

=== Arian controversy ===
No suspicion of heresy was attached to the academy until 1710, when Hallett's son Joseph III became an assistant tutor, and brought in discussion of William Whiston's views. Rumours spread as to the freedom of christological opinion permitted in the academy, until in September 1718 the Exeter assembly (a mixed body of Presbyterian and Congregationalist ministers) called for a declaration of belief in the Holy Trinity to be made by all its members. Hallett was the first to comply; his declaration, though adopted by some and not formally objected to by any, was not satisfactory to the majority. In November the 13 trustees who held the property of the Exeter meeting-houses applied to their ministers for further assurances of orthodoxy, and failed to obtain them.

On the advice of five London ministers, of whom Edmund Calamy was one, the case was laid before seven Devon Presbyterian divines, whose decision led the trustees to exclude (6 March 1719) Hallett and Peirce from James' Meeting, and on 10 March from all the meeting-houses. In Calamy's view the trustees exceeded their powers; a vote of the congregation should have been taken. Hallett and Peirce secured a temporary place of worship, which was opened on 15 March. They were still members of the Exeter assembly. This body in May proposed that all its members should subscribe Thomas Bradbury's "gallery declaration" (see Salter's Hall controversy); at this point 56 did so, while 19 refused and seceded. On 6 May a paper was drawn up, apparently by Hallett, whose signature stood first, in which the charges of Arianism and of baptising in the name of the Father only are disclaimed.

==== Arian church ====
Having been ejected from his own congregation, Hallett and his son created a new church group. A new building, called the Mint Meeting, was erected for Hallett and Peirce and opened in 1719. The congregation numbered about 300. Hallett's academy did not long survive these changes; it was closed in 1720. A list of 37 of his students was in the Monthly Repository, 1818, p. 89: they included James Foster and Peter King.

Hallett died in 1722.

== Works ==
Hallett published:

- Twenty-seven Queries addressed to Quakers, and printed in Gospel Truths Scripturally asserted … by John Gannacliff and Joseph Nott, 1692.
- Christ's Ascension into Heaven, 1693.
- A Sermon, … at the Funeral of … Geo. Trosse … to which is added a Short Account of his Life, 1713.
- The Life of … Geo. Trosse … written by himself, 1714.

== Notes ==
Attribution

This article incorporates text from a publication now in the public domain: Stephen, Leslie; Lee, Sidney, eds. (1890). "Hallett, Joseph (1666-1722)". Dictionary of National Biography. Vol. 24. London: Smith, Elder & Co.
