= Downing Place United Reformed Church, Cambridge =

Church building in Cambridge, England

Coordinates: 52.2032°N 0.1227°E

Downing Place United Reformed Church
- Downing Place URC

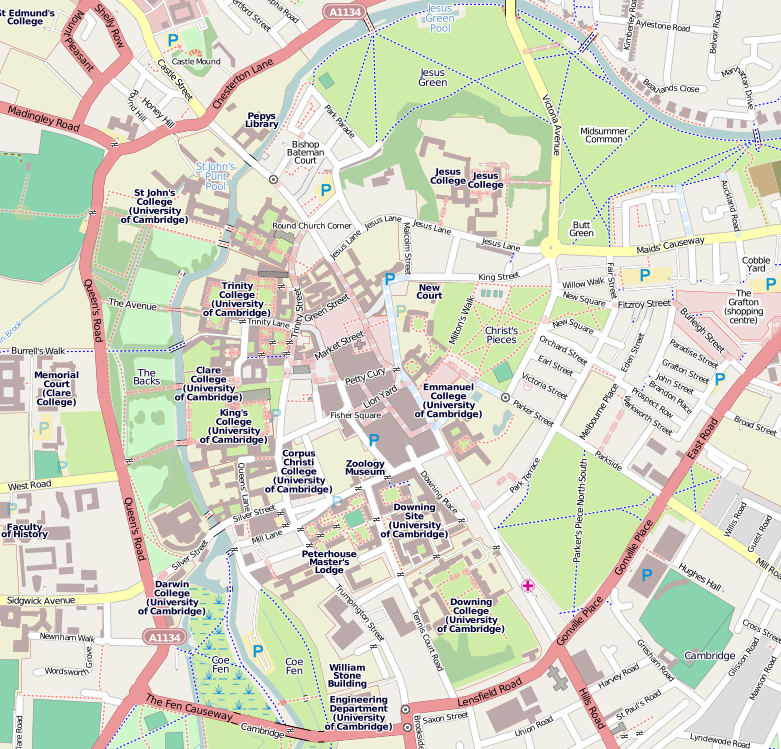
- Location in Downing Place, Cambridge
- Location: Central Cambridge
- Country: England
- Denomination: United Reformed Church
- Website: https://downingplaceurc.org/

History
- Former name(s): Emmanuel URC, Emmanuel Congregational Church, Emmanuel Congregational Chapel, Hog Hill Independent Church; St Columba's URC, St Columba's Presbyterian Church

Downing Place United Reformed Church, Cambridge is a church in Cambridge, England, that is part of the United Reformed Church. It was formed in 2018 in a merger between St Columba's Church, Cambridge, and Emmanuel Church, Cambridge. The church occupies the former St Columba's building in Downing Place, which is close to a site occupied by Emmanuel's congregation before 1874.

In the recent past prior to the merger of the two congregations, activities have included regular Sunday worship, a programme of music concerts, hosting an NHS group therapy centre and hosting a night-time drop-in centre hosted by Cambridge Street Pastors. The refurbishment has been designed to facilitate similar activities.

== History ==
=== Emmanuel Church ===
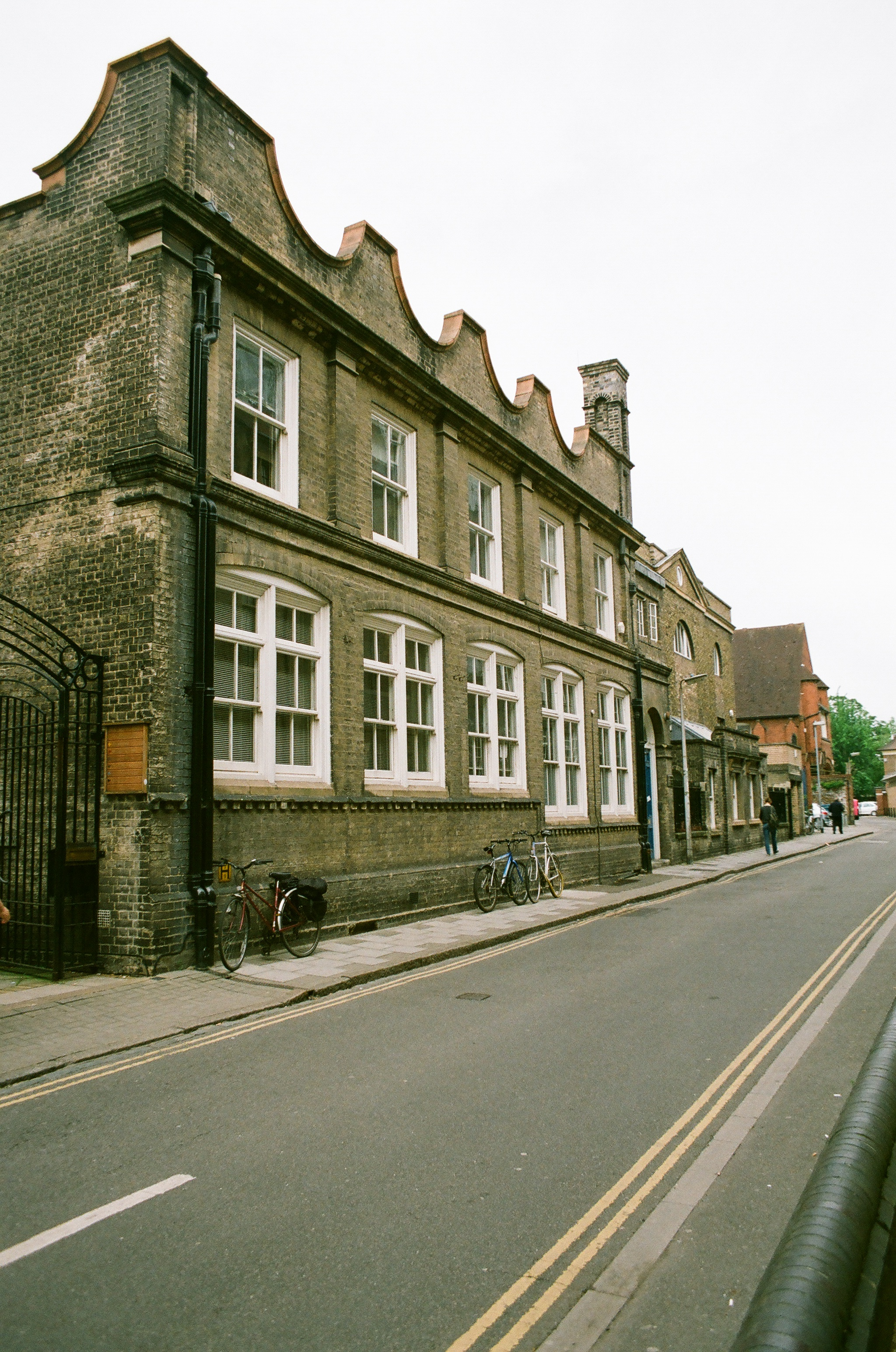
Site of the former Hog Hill chapel, Downing Place, Cambridge

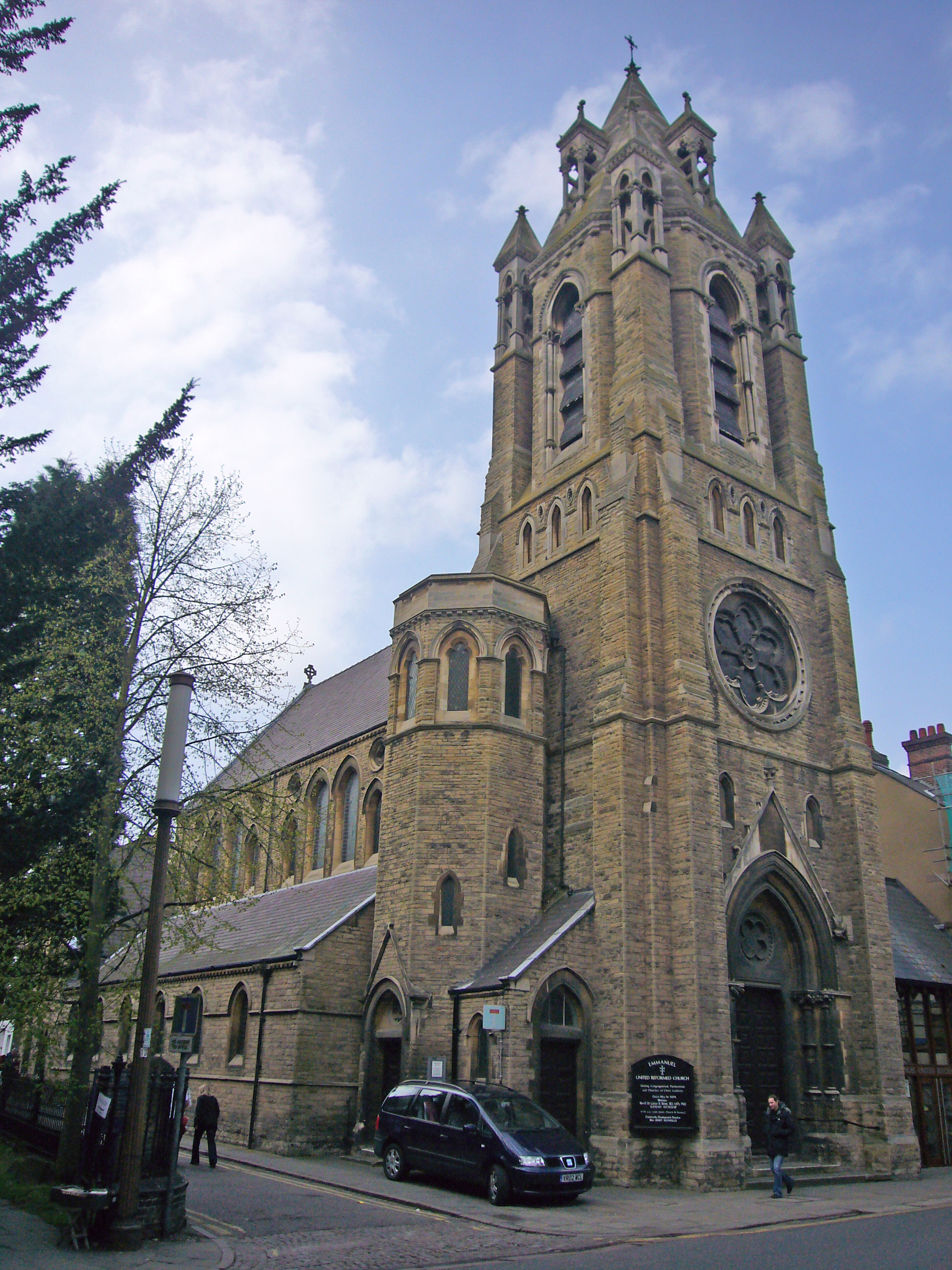
The former Emmanuel Church building, Trumpington Street, Cambridge

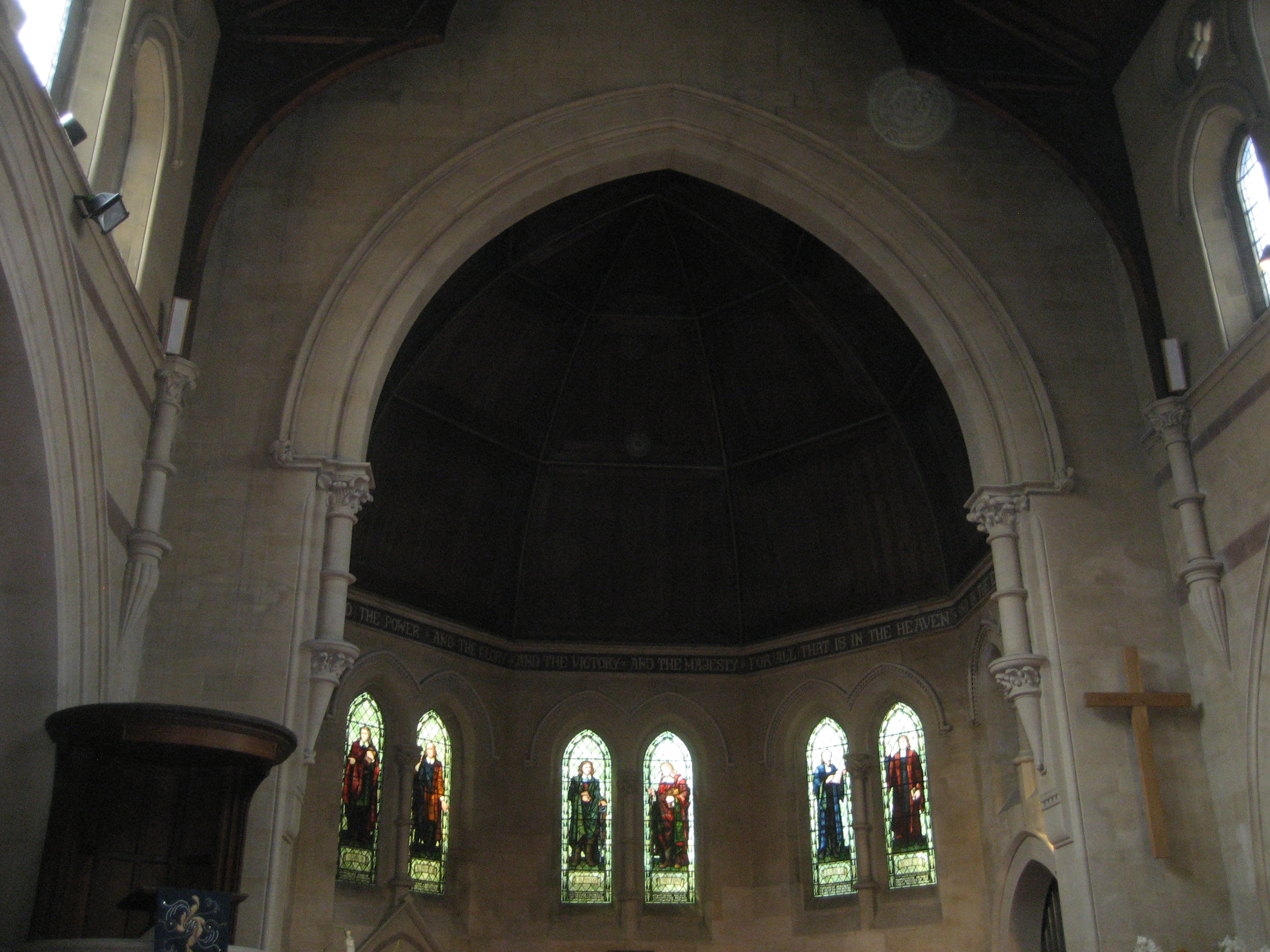
Stained-glass windows of 1905 by Morris & Co. in the former Emmanuel URC building, depicting Puritans with Cambridge connections. From left to right: Henry Barrow, John Greenwood, Oliver Cromwell, John Milton, Francis Holcroft and Joseph Hussey

Originally a congregational church, Emmanuel voted to join the new United Reformed Church in 1972. Emmanuel had been known by different names over the years, first as the 'Hog Hill Independent Church' and then the 'Emmanuel Congregational Chapel' or 'Emmanuel Congregational Church'.

The Emmanuel congregation was founded as the Cambridge 'Great Meeting' in 1687, at Hog Hill, the original building being there, on what is now the Old Music School in Downing Place. From 1691 the minister was Joseph Hussey; he was commemorated in the stained glass in the apse of the Emmanuel church building alongside John Greenwood, Henry Barrow, Oliver Cromwell, John Milton and Francis Holcroft. Hussey's congregation split in 1696, with some going to the meeting in Green Street, Cambridge, and again after he had left for London, in 1721, with a group founding the precursor of St Andrew's Street Baptist Church, Cambridge. The church was rebuilt on the same site, opening as Emmanuel Congregational Chapel in 1790. The move to the new church on Trumpington Street, called the Emmanuel Congregational Church, came in 1874. The old chapel was put to use from 1881 as the Balfour Biological Laboratory for Women, for female science students in the University of Cambridge. Prior to September 2020, Emmanuel United Reformed Church occupied the Trumpington Street building. It was built to a design by the architect James Cubitt in 1875. The church was listed as Grade II in 1996. The building was sold to Pembroke College to form part of the college's Mill Lane development project.

In the years leading up to the merger, Emmanuel organised regular Sunday worship and a programme of community activities in the recent past: a volunteer-staffed fairtrade cafe, a series of lunchtime music recitals and a share in Hope Cambridge's Churches Homeless Project. The Cambridge branch of the Open Table Network was founded here in July 2018.

=== St Columba's Church ===
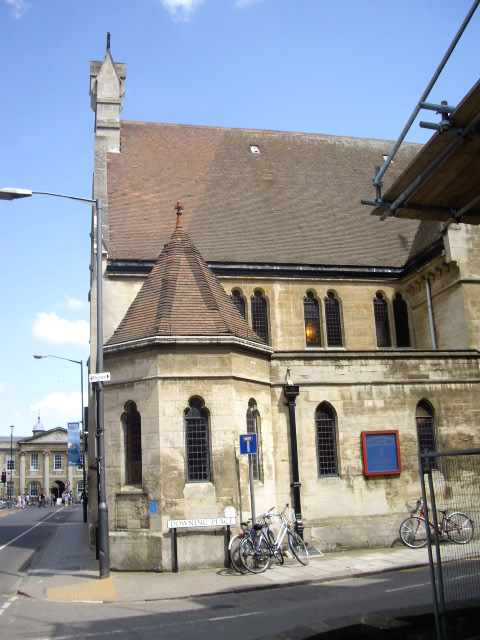
St Columba's from across Downing Place (before refurbishment)

St Columba's was originally a Presbyterian church. A Presbyterian congregation was first registered in Cambridge in 1689, at that time based in Green Street. The congregation of St Columba's was formally established in 1881, initially worshipping in Cambridge Guildhall.

The St Columba’s church building, on the corner of Downing Place and Downing Street, was built in 1891 in the Early English style to the designs of Scottish architect John Macvicar Anderson. As well as being a congregation of the Presbyterian Church of England and, from 1972, of the United Reformed Church, St Columba's was also the Chaplaincy for the Church of Scotland to the University of Cambridge; the minister's appointment as chaplain being with the concurrence of the Kirk's Presbytery of England.

In the years leading up to the merger, St Columba's, the church's programme included regular Sunday worship, hosting a group therapy centre, and a night-time drop-in centre hosted by Cambridge Street Pastors.

=== Merger to form Downing Place United Reformed Church ===
On 9 June (St Columba's Day) 2018, St Columba's Church and Emmanuel Church united to form Downing Place United Reformed Church. The combined congregation occupies the former St Columba's building in Downing Place. The St Columba’s site has been extensively renovated as part of a £3.3 million project led by Archangel Architects.

The Emmanuel building was sold to Pembroke College, Cambridge across the road in Trumpington Street, who intended to retain it as a lecture and performance area as part of their Mill Lane redevelopment. The final service in the Emmanuel building took place on 26 July 2020 and all church activities at Trumpington Street have ceased.

While the St Columba's Church building was closed for major building works, regular worship took place in Westminster College, Cambridge. The newly restored building was rededicated in November 2021.

=== People ===
The new Pembroke College Auditorium, created from the former Emmanuel United Reform Church

Ministers of Emmanuel Church have included John Conder (1738–1754), James Ward (1871-1872) and P. T. Forsyth (1894–1901).

Ministers of St Columba's Church have included Keith Riglin (1997-2008).

Others associated with the two churches include Michael Ramsey, later Archbishop of Canterbury, who worshipped at what was then Emmanuel Congregational church as a child, where his father was a deacon. Among those listed on the Roll of Honour of Missionaries valedicted from St Columba's Church are two notable ecumenists, William Paton to India in 1919 (first general secretary of what is now the National Council of Churches in India), and Lesslie Newbigin to India in 1936 (becoming one of the first bishops of the new Church of South India in 1947). Agnes Smith Lewis and Margaret Dunlop Gibson, biblical scholars sometimes known as the "Westminster sisters" attended St Columba's and are commemorated by a plaque.
