= Ladymead Community School =

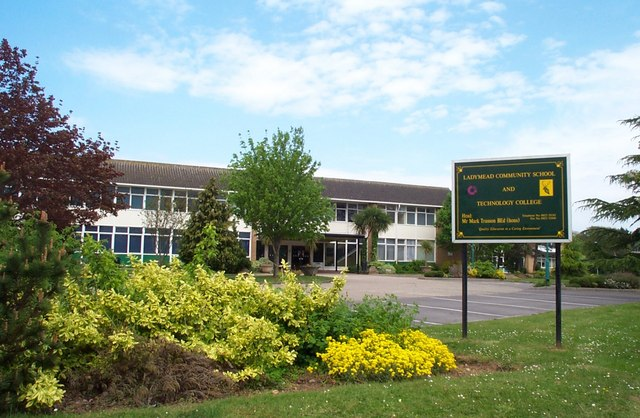

Location
- Cheddon Road; Taunton, Somerset, TA2 7QP; England
- Coordinates: 51.0375°N 3.1003°W

Information
- Type: Comprehensive
- Closed: July 2010
- Local authority: Somerset
- Specialist: Technology College
- Department for Education URN: 123887 Tables
- Ofsted: Reports
- Head: Mark Trusson
- Gender: mixed
- Age: 11 to 17
- Enrolment: 753
- Houses: Shakespeare, Shelley, Newton and Anning

Ladymead Community School was a secondary school and technology college located on Cheddon Road, Taunton, Somerset, England. It had 753 students aged 11–16.

The school made the news when a protest of hundreds of students turned into a riot, prompting police to enter the school.

The school closed in July 2010 following successive years of poor standards, on site crime and Ofsted investigations. Students were subsequently transferred to The Taunton Academy.

== Academic results ==
In 2008 just 42% of students achieved five or more GCSEs at A* - C grades including English and Maths.

The school was awarded the Specialist Schools and Academy trust's "most improved school" award in both 2007 and 2008, based on exam results improvements, however continued to fall below national average.
