= Joseph Hallett III =

English nonconformist minister and author

Joseph Hallett III (c.1691–1744) was an English nonconformist minister and author.

== Life ==
=== Early life ===
The eldest son of Joseph Hallett II (1656–1722), he was born at Exeter in 1691 or 1692. He was educated at his father's dissenting academy, where among his class-mates was John Fox, who found him serious and studious. From 1710 he acted as assistant tutor, and early in that year he was attracted by the Advice for the Study of Divinity in William Whiston's Sermons and Essays (1709). He wrote to Whiston, who wrote back on 1 May 1710, seemingly under the impression that his correspondent was the father.

On 6 May 1713 Hallett was licensed to preach, and on 19 October 1715 was ordained at Exeter along with John Lavington. Alexander Gordon in the Dictionary of National Biography tentatively identified him as the Hallett who, according to Evans's list, was minister for a time to a congregation at Martock, Somerset.

=== Arian controversy ===
He signed the disclaimer of Arianism (6 May 1719) drawn up by his father, and took part in the controversy which divided the Exeter assembly, aiming to reconcile the unity of God with a recognition of the Son as subordinate deity. The outcome saw the elder Hallett and James Pierce excluded from their meeting-house, and the academy shut down.

==== Arian church ====
Having been ejected from his own congregation, the elder Hallett and Pierce created a new church group. A new building, called the Mint Meeting, was erected and opened in 1719.

On his father's death (1722) Hallett succeeded him as colleague to Peirce at the Mint Meeting. When Peirce died (1726) his place was taken by Thomas Jeffery, formerly a student at the elder Hallett's academy. Fox describes Hallett as "a popular preacher, learned and laborious".

He died on 2 April 1744.

== Family ==
His grandfather was Joseph Hallett I (1620 - 1689), a English clergyman who preached in churches and at conventicles before becoming the first minister of James's Meeting, the largest Presbyterian church in Exeter.

Hallett III was married to Francis, who outlived him.

== Works ==
Hallett attempted to steer, with Samuel Clarke, a course between Arianism and Trinitarian orthodoxy. Some of his conjectural emendations of the received text of the Hebrew scriptures, in A Free and Impartial Study of the Holy Scriptures … being Notes … Discourses, and Observations (1729; 2nd vol. 1732; 3rd vol. 1736) which was his major work, were variant readings later accepted by Benjamin Kennicott. He published:

- Reflections on the … Reasons why many citizens of Exeter [...], 1720.
- The Unity of God not inconsistent with the Divinity of Christ, 1720.
- A Funeral Sermon for the Rev. James Peirce, 1726.
- Index Librorum MSS. … et Versionum … Novi Fœderis, 1728.
- A Defence of a Discourse on the Impossibility of Proving a Future State by the Light of Nature, 1731, reply to Henry Grove).
- A Paraphrase and Notes on … Philemon]], 1731, (anon.).
- A Paraphrase … on the Three Last Chapters of … Hebrews, 1733.
- The Consistent Christian, 1738 (against Thomas Chubb, Thomas Woolston, and Thomas Morgan).

With some of these works anonymous, the attributions are uncertain. A Reply to Dr Waterland (1720) was by Hallett by common accord, according to John Enty. He wrote some further tracts in the Arian controversy and against the Deists. The Belief of the Subordination of the Son … no characteristick of an Arian (1719) is now thought on internal evidence to be by his father.

== Notes ==
Attribution

This article incorporates text from a publication now in the public domain: Stephen, Leslie; Lee, Sidney, eds. (1890). "Hallett, Joseph (1691?-1744)". Dictionary of National Biography. Vol. 24. London: Smith, Elder & Co.
