= Joseph Hussey =

English theologian

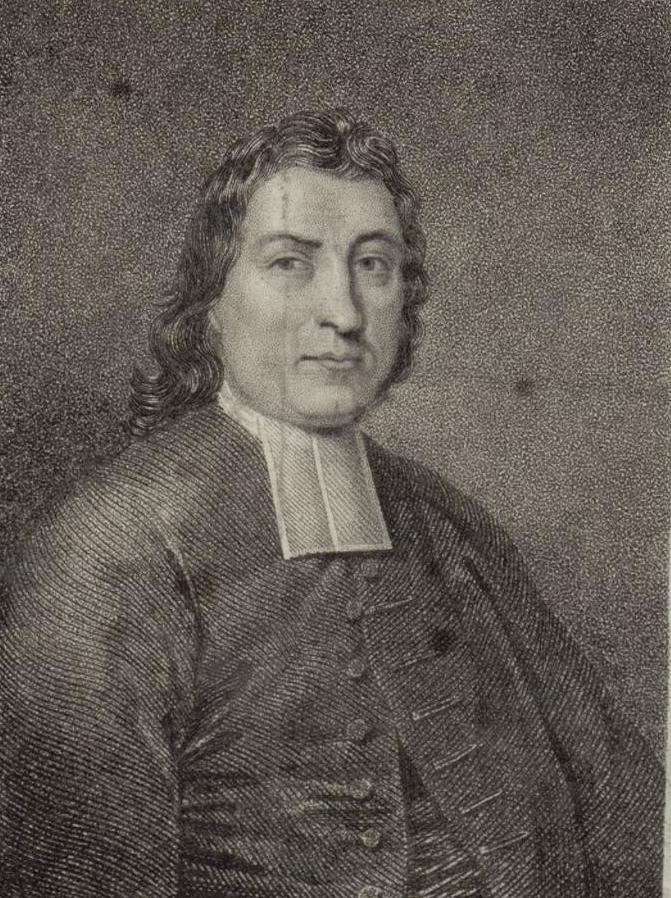
Portrait of Joseph Hussey

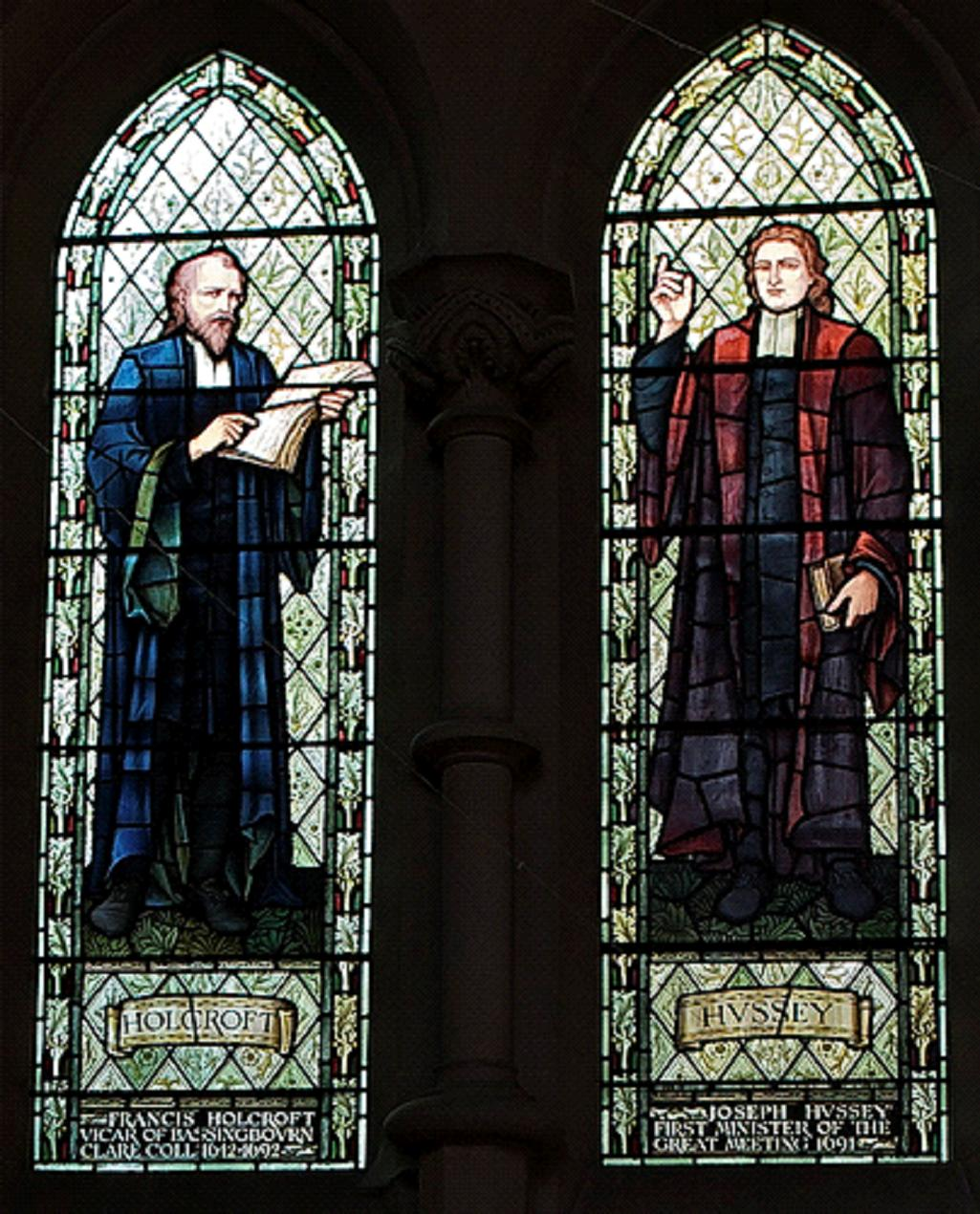
Joseph Hussey (right) and Francis Holcroft in the former Emmanuel United Reformed Church, Cambridge

Joseph Hussey (1660–1726) was an English Calvinist and congregationalist minister.

== Life ==
Hussey was born in Fordingbridge, Hampshire. After studying with the ejected minister Robert Whitaker, he attended Charles Morton's dissenting academy at Newington Green. He attributed a 1686 conversion to the reading of Stephen Charnock's The Existence and Attributes of God.

In 1688, Hussey underwent ordination in a Reformed church. He was pastor at Hitchin, and then from 1691 in Cambridge, Stephen Scandrett preaching as he took up the post. At that time the congregation met at the Hog Hill church, where a piece of land had been bought in 1687 on the basis of the Declaration of Indulgence; and it took on the name "Great Meeting". From 1694 Hussey's Cambridge church was congregational; but there was a Presbyterian secession in 1696, who moved to a meeting in Green Street.

He moved to a ministry in Petticoat Lane, London, in 1719.

== Works ==
He wrote:

- The Gospel Feast Opened (1693)
- The Glory of Christ Unveil'd or the Excellency of Christ Vindicated (1706)
- God's Operations of Grace but No Offers of His Grace (1707).

The two latter books, on the denial of the free offer of the gospel, were influential in the formation of English hyper-Calvinism. Distinctive of Hussey's views were supralapsarianism, the doctrine of irresistible grace, and a christology derived in part from Thomas Goodwin. Those who followed Hussey's views included William Bentley, John Skepp and Samuel Stockell.

== Notes ==
- Joseph Hussey Glory of Christ Website
- Surman Library entry
- The Emergence of Hyper-Calvinism in English Nonconformity, 1689-1765 by Peter Toon (1967)
