= The Taunton Academy =

Pyrland School

Location
- Cheddon Road; Taunton, Somerset, TA2 7QP; England; 51.0375°N 3.1003°W

Information
- Type: Academy
- Religious affiliation: Church of England
- Established: September 2010
- Department for Education URN: 136193 Tables
- Ofsted: Reports
- Head: Mark Lawrence
- Gender: Co-educational
- Age: 11 to 16
- Enrolment: 728
- Colours: Black, grey and purple
- Academy sponsors: Richard Huish College
- Website: https://www.thetauntonacademy.co.uk

Pyrland School (formerly The Taunton Academy) is a school with academy status in Taunton, Somerset, England. The school was formed by the merger of The St Augustine of Canterbury Church of England/Roman Catholic VA School and Ladymead Community School. Its original sponsors were Somerset County Council and the Diocese of Bath and Wells, however the school transferred to the Richard Huish Trust in 2015 and was sponsored by Richard Huish College. Pyrland School joined Midsomer Norton School Partnership in February 2026 after being supported since March 2025. It was opened on 9 September 2010 by Peter Price, the Bishop of Bath and Wells. Initially the academy admitted pupils aged 11 to 16 and will be based in the existing schools' buildings. In September 2011, the academy opened a sixth form for 100 students. In 2013, the academy moved to new and refurbished buildings on the former Ladymead site on Cheddon Road, with the former St Augustine site being closed. This plan was temporarily put on hold following the government's major review of the Building Schools for the Future programme in July 2010, and was subject to review by the Department for Education.

== History ==
The expression of interest to become an academy was submitted by the sponsors to the Department for Children, Schools and Families in February 2009. The submission document confirmed that both schools had a set of problems. St Augustine had 274 pupils on roll against its capacity of 610, was in the lowest band for deprivation with 21.2% of pupils receiving free school meals against the local authority average of 7.9%, had 38% of pupils achieving five or more GCSE qualifications including English and Mathematics against the local authority average of 46.7% and national average of 47%, and for three years between 2006 and 2009 had set deficit budgets of between 8% and 14%. Ladymead had 746 pupils on roll against a capacity of 880, had 11.4% of pupils receiving free school meals, and had 41% of pupils achieving five or more GCSE qualifications including English and Mathematics.

The application was approved by education minister Jim Knight in March 2009. By June 2009, the plans looked to be under threat as parental consultation by governors at Ladymead showed strong opposition to the new academy. However, the final go-ahead was given in January 2010, when the government agreed to the academy's funding.

== Ofsted Inspections ==
In 2015 the school was transferred to the Richard Huish Trust with a 'requires improvement' rating, by 10 January 2017 the rating had dropped to 'inadequate'. On 29 November 2022 a formal notice was served on the Richard Huish Trust advising that the school appeared to be 'coasting'. On 3 May 2023 a second notice was served as the Trust was failing to make the necessary improvements towards minimal standards, the notice advised that the school's funding agreement may be terminated by the Secretary of State.
