= List of tourist attractions in Amsterdam =

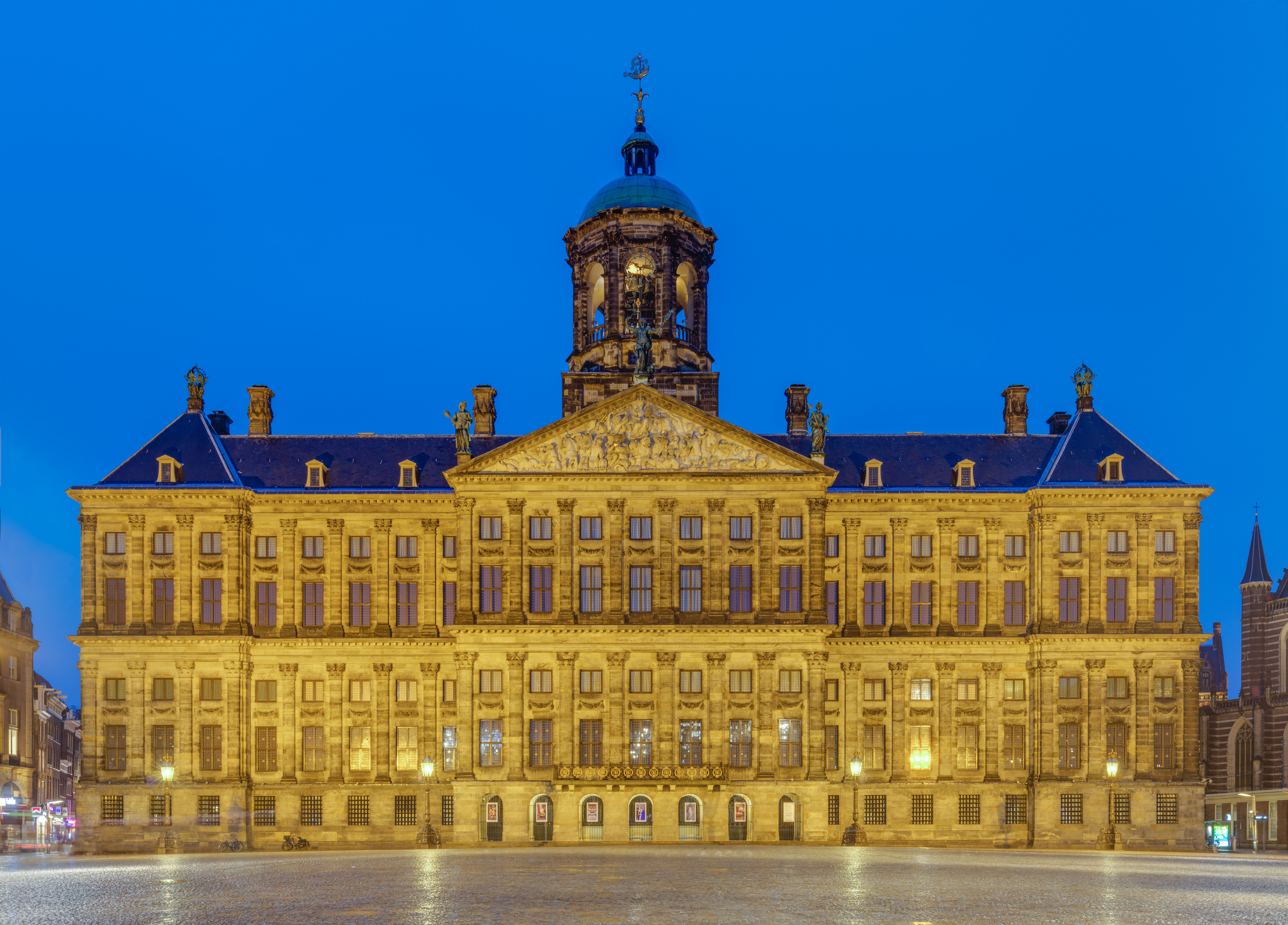
Royal Palace of Amsterdam

Amsterdam, one of Europe's capitals, has many attractions for visitors. The city's most famous sight is the 17th-century canals of Amsterdam (in Dutch: grachtengordel), located in the heart of Amsterdam, have been added to the UNESCO World Heritage List.

== Museums ==
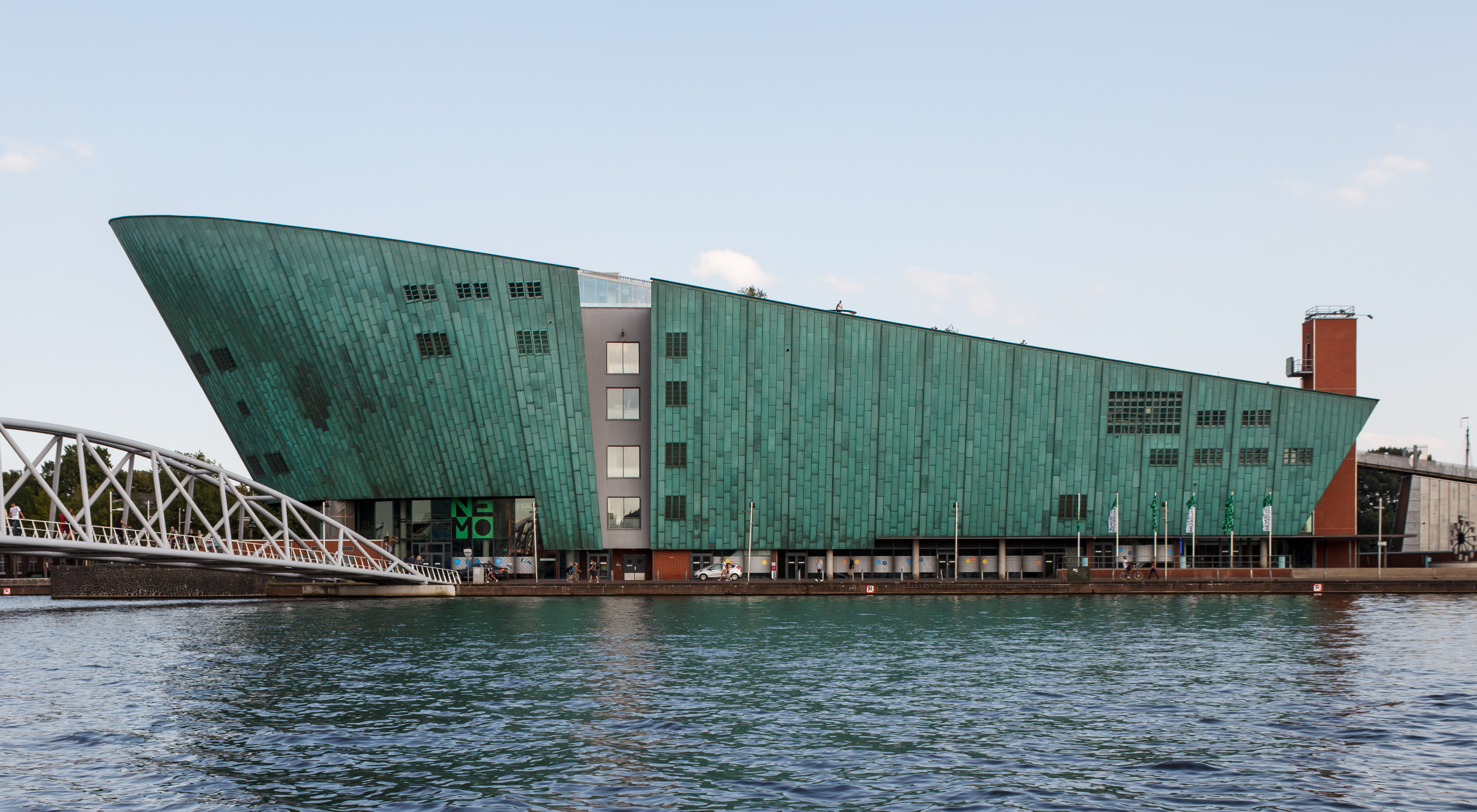
Nemo museum in Amsterdam

- The Rijksmuseum is the national museum of the Netherlands.
- The Van Gogh Museum specialises in works by Vincent van Gogh.
- The Stedelijk Museum specialises in modern art.
- Eye Filmmuseum (2012)
- The Rembrandt House Museum specialises in works by Rembrandt.
- The Anne Frank House, Prinsengracht 263.
- The Museum Het Grachtenhuis (The Canal House Museum), gateway to the canals, Herengracht 386
- The H'ART Museum
- The Wereldmuseum, anthropological museum.
- The NEMO, the science museum in a building that looks like a sinking ship.
- The Verzetsmuseum, the Amsterdam resistance museum.
- The Amsterdam Museum, Amsterdam's historical museum.
- The Allard Pierson Museum, Archaeological Museum of the University of Amsterdam.
- The Bijbels Museum, where the Bible, art and culture meet in a monument full of history.
- The Filmmuseum, Holland's museum for cinematography.
- The Joods Historisch Museum, The Jewish Historical Museum collects objects and works of art associated with the religion, culture and history of the Jews in the Netherlands and its former colonies.
- The Museum Van Loon, a home on the canal. The double-sized canal house dates from 1672.
- Het Scheepvaartmuseum, museum about Dutch maritime history. Reopened on the 1 October 2011 after renovations since January 2007.
- Diamond Museum Amsterdam, a museum at the Museumplein about the history of diamonds.

== Religious sites ==
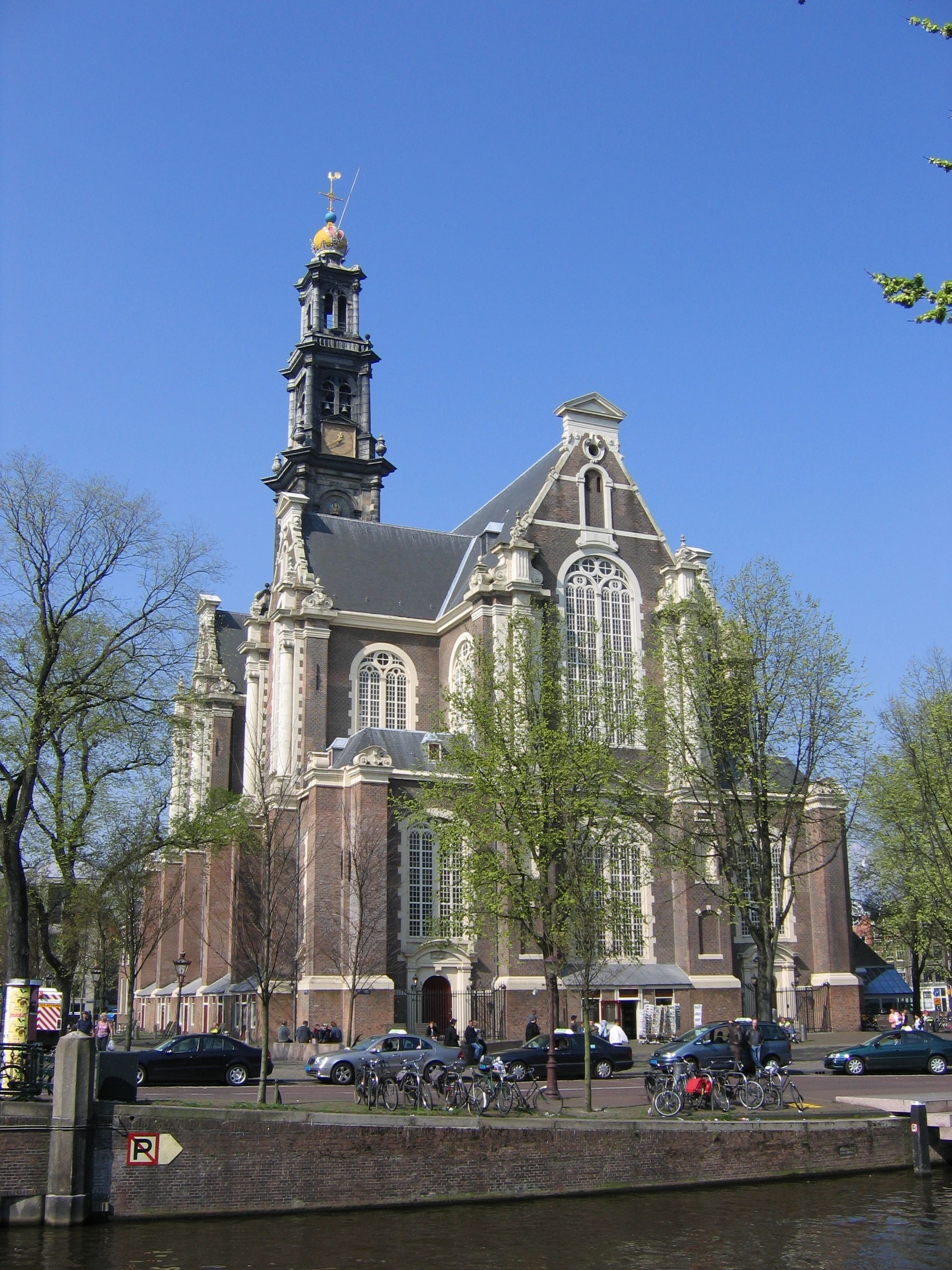
The Westerkerk

- Obrechtkerk (1911)
- Oude Kerk ("Old Church") (ca. 1306).
- Nieuwe Kerk ("New Church") (1408).
- Zuiderkerk ("Southern Church"), the city's first church built specifically for Protestant services (1603–1611).
- Noorderkerk ("Northern Church") (1620–1623).
- Westerkerk ("Western Church"), finished in 1638 after a design by Hendrick de Keyser
- Westermoskee ("Western mosque") (2015).
- Oosterkerk ("Eastern Church"), construction was completed in 1671.
- Ronde Lutherse Kerk ("Round Lutheran Church"), the first round Lutheran church in the Netherlands, with a copper dome.
- English Reformed Church, in fact part of the Church of Scotland. One of the oldest buildings in Amsterdam, situated in the Begijnhof, right in the centre of the city.
- De Krijtberg, a Neo-Gothic church with twin towers at the Singel canal.
- Basilica of Saint Nicholas, a Neo-Renaissance and Baroque Roman Catholic basilica.
- Begijnhof Chapel (1665)
- He Hua Temple (2000), Buddhist temple.
- De Duif ("The Dove")
- Ons' Lieve Heer op Solder ("Our Lord in the Attic"), also known as Museum Amstelkring, a church hidden in an attic.
- De papegaai ("The Parrot"), located in the busy Kalverstraat, a Neo-Gothic church built in 1848.
- Mozes en Aäronkerk ("Moses and Aaron Church"), a Neoclassic church with twin towers on Waterlooplein.
- Portuguese Synagogue (1675)

== Bridges ==
- The Magere Brug is probably the most famous drawbridge in Amsterdam.
- The Blauwbrug, which connects the Rembrandtplein area with the Waterlooplein area.
- The Python Bridge, bridge connects Sporenburg to Borneo Island and won the International Footbridge Award 2002.

== Buildings ==
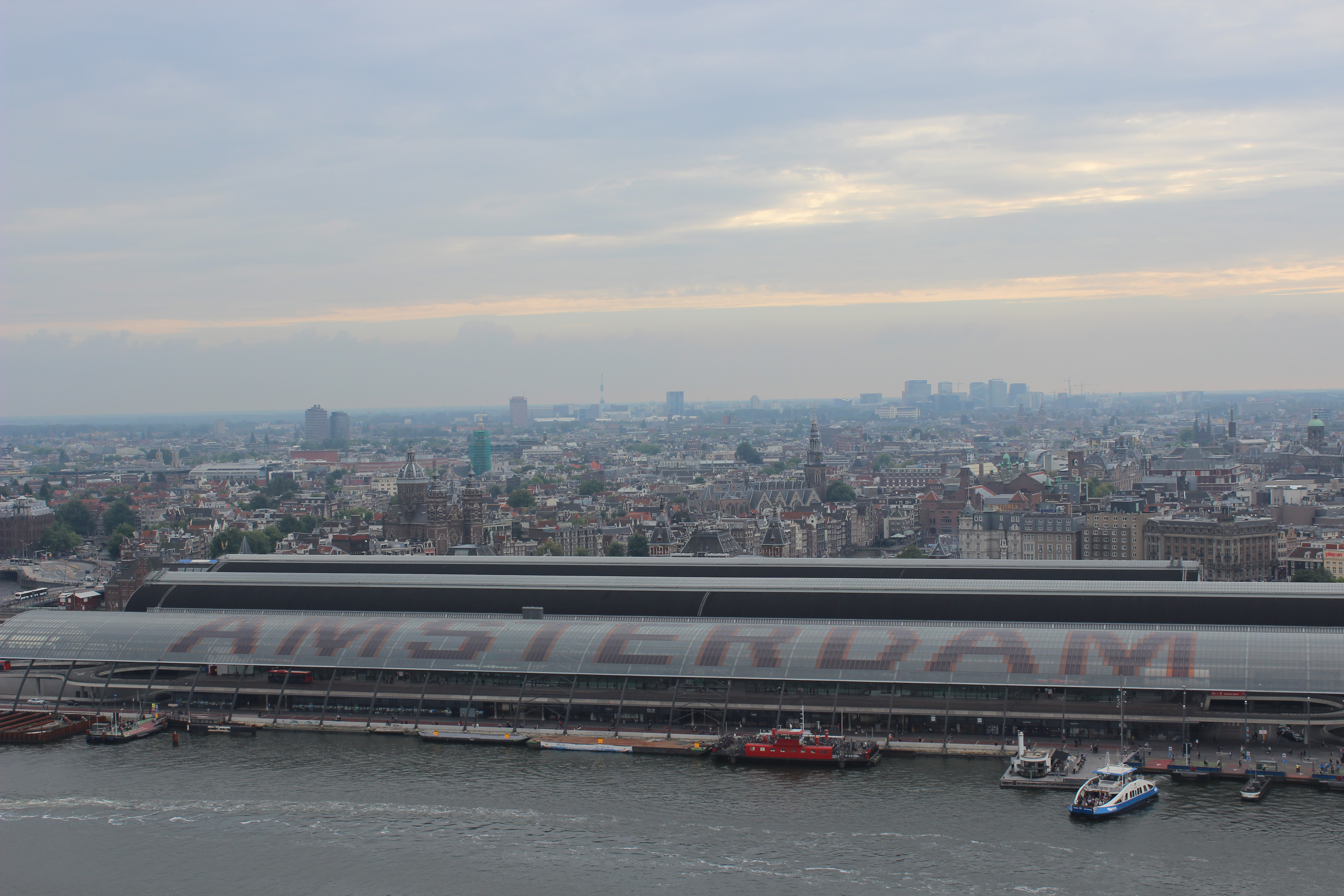
Amsterdam Heritage City view from Lookout

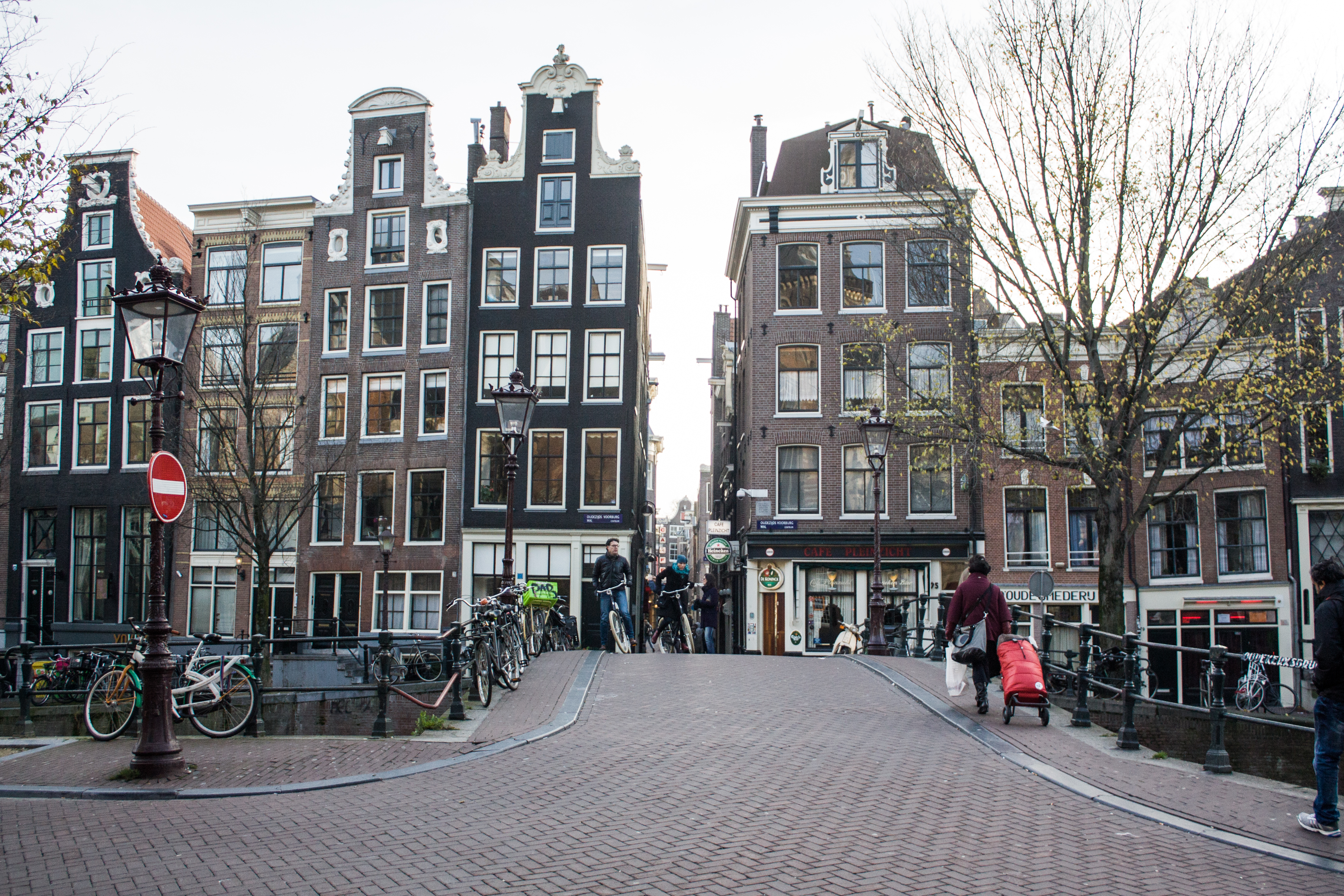
Houses in Amsterdam

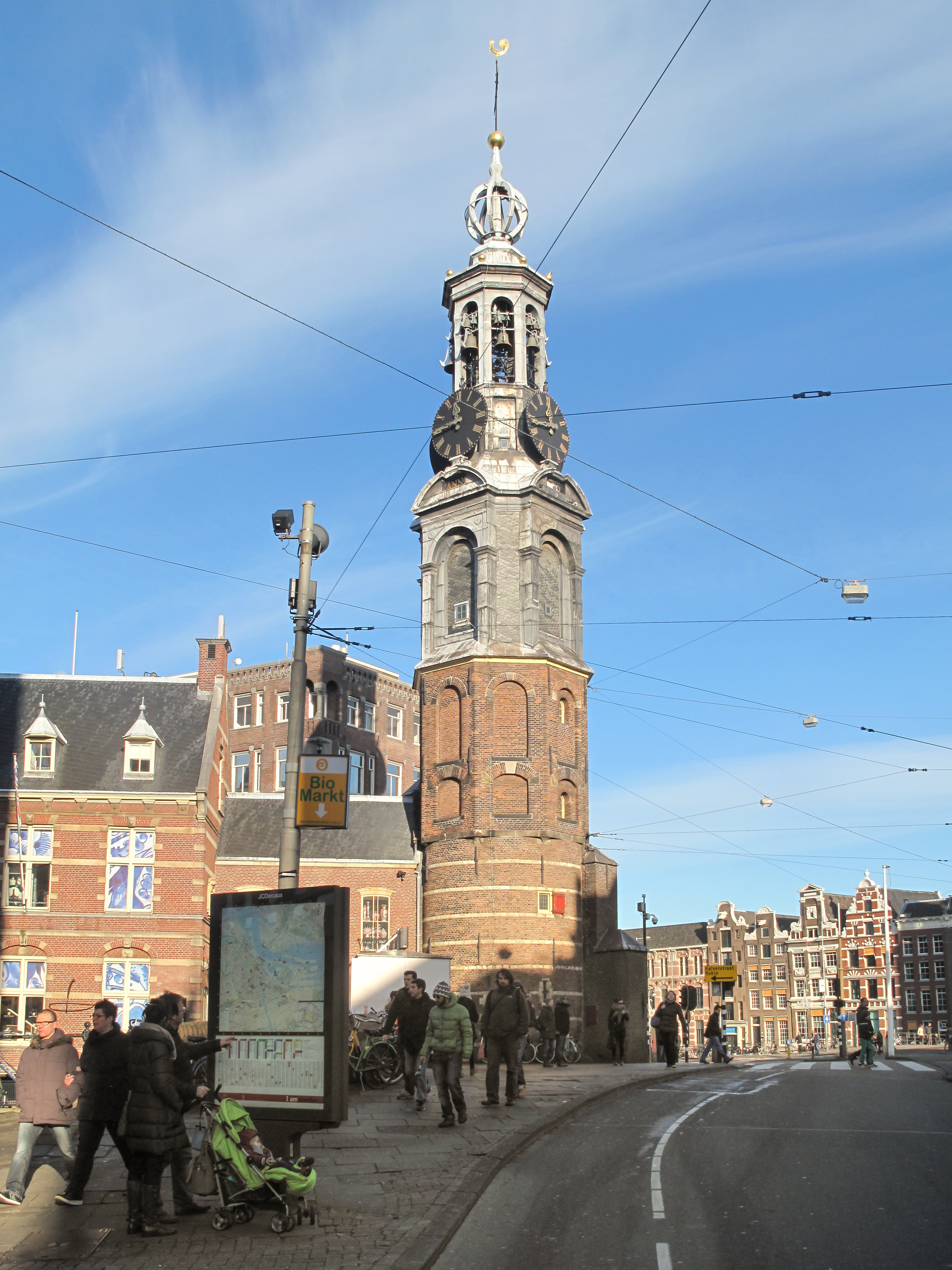
Munttoren

- Royal Palace, former town hall, built in 1648.
- Stopera, combined town hall and opera house.
- Kalvertoren, shopping mall located in the busy Kalverstraat.
- AEX, stock exchange.
- Beurs van Berlage, originally designed as a commodity exchange by architect Hendrik Petrus Berlage, now used for conferences.
- Centraal Station, neo-Gothic building.
- Waag, built as part of the city's fortifications in 1481–1494, later a weighing house, now a cafe and museum.
- Montelbaanstoren, built in 1512 as a part of the city's fortifications.
- Munttoren, the tower was built in 1619–1620 and it is the southern tower among all other ones in Amsterdam
- Magna Plaza, a former post office dating back to 1899 converted into a shopping mall in 1990
- Lloyd Hotel, built between 1917 and 1920 as an emigrants' hotel.
- East India House, headquarters of Dutch East India Company, a 17th-century Dutch trading giant, from 1606 to 1798. Now a university building.
- Rembrandt Tower, a 150-metre skyscraper.
- Bijlmerbajes, a former prison complex in Amsterdam near Amstel station.

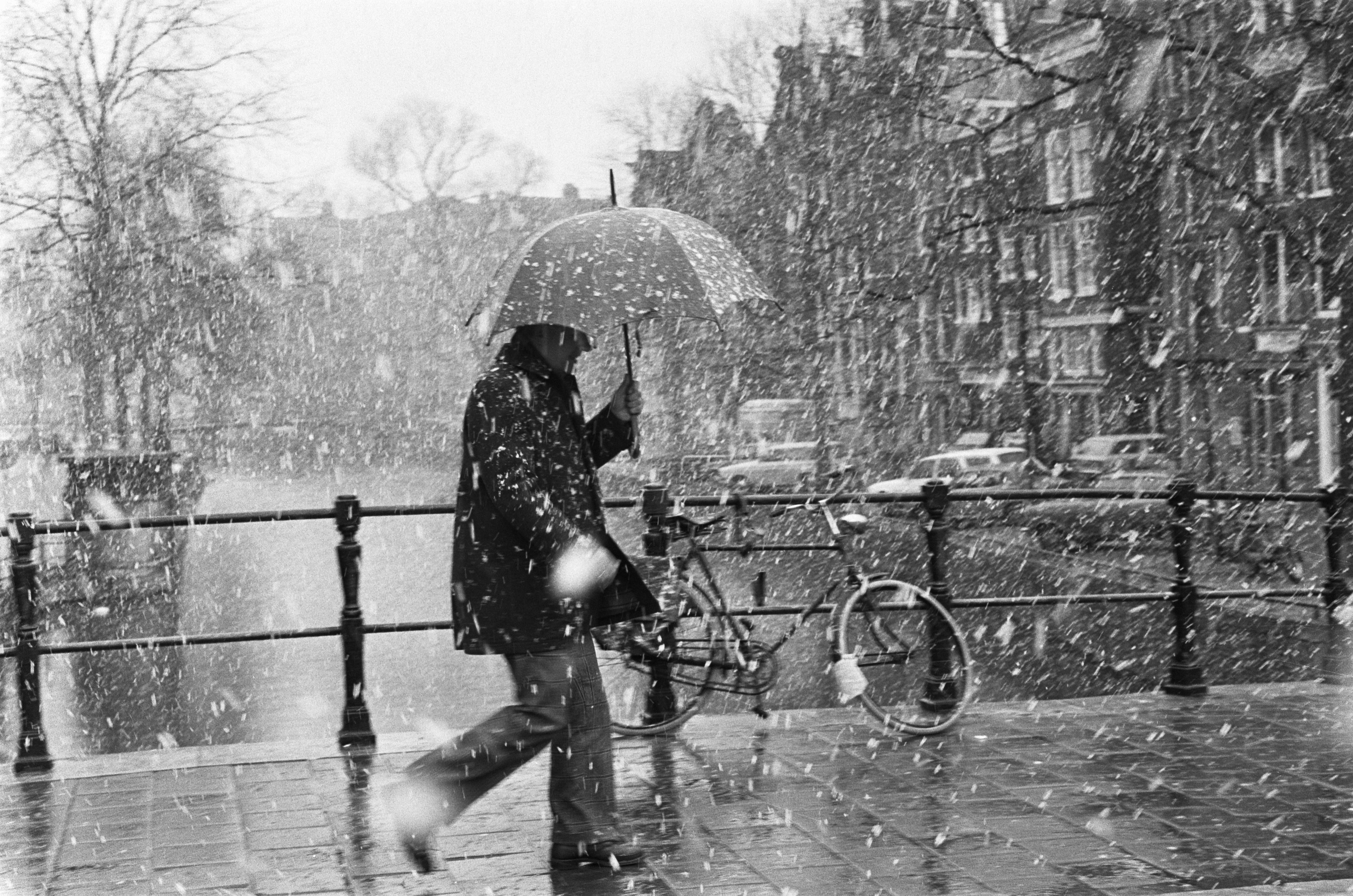
Amsterdam in winter

- Johan Cruyff Arena, a football stadium, home to Ajax football club.
- A'dam Tower, a 100-meter-high lookout near the IJ river.
- Begijnhof, one of the oldest inner courts in Amsterdam.
- Portuguese Synagogue, impressive building founded by the Sephardic Jewish community in 1670.
- El Tawheed Mosque, a mosque founded in 1986.
- Homomonument, a memorial in the centre of Amsterdam commemorating all gay men and lesbians who have been subjected to persecution because of their sexual orientation.
- Millennium Tower, a 97.5-metre, 24-floor office building.
- Olympic Stadium, built as the main stadium for the 1928 Summer Olympics. It was designed by the architect Jan Wils.
- The Amsterdam Metro, a metro system with five lines.
- Public Library by architect J. Coenen on Oosterdokseiland, near Central Station. Has a wonderful view over the city.
- Shan He Hua Temple, the largest Buddhist temple in Europe built in the traditional Chinese style.
- The Smallest House in Amsterdam, only 2.02 meters (6 ft., 7.5 in.) in width and 5 meters (16 ft. 4.0 in.) in depth.

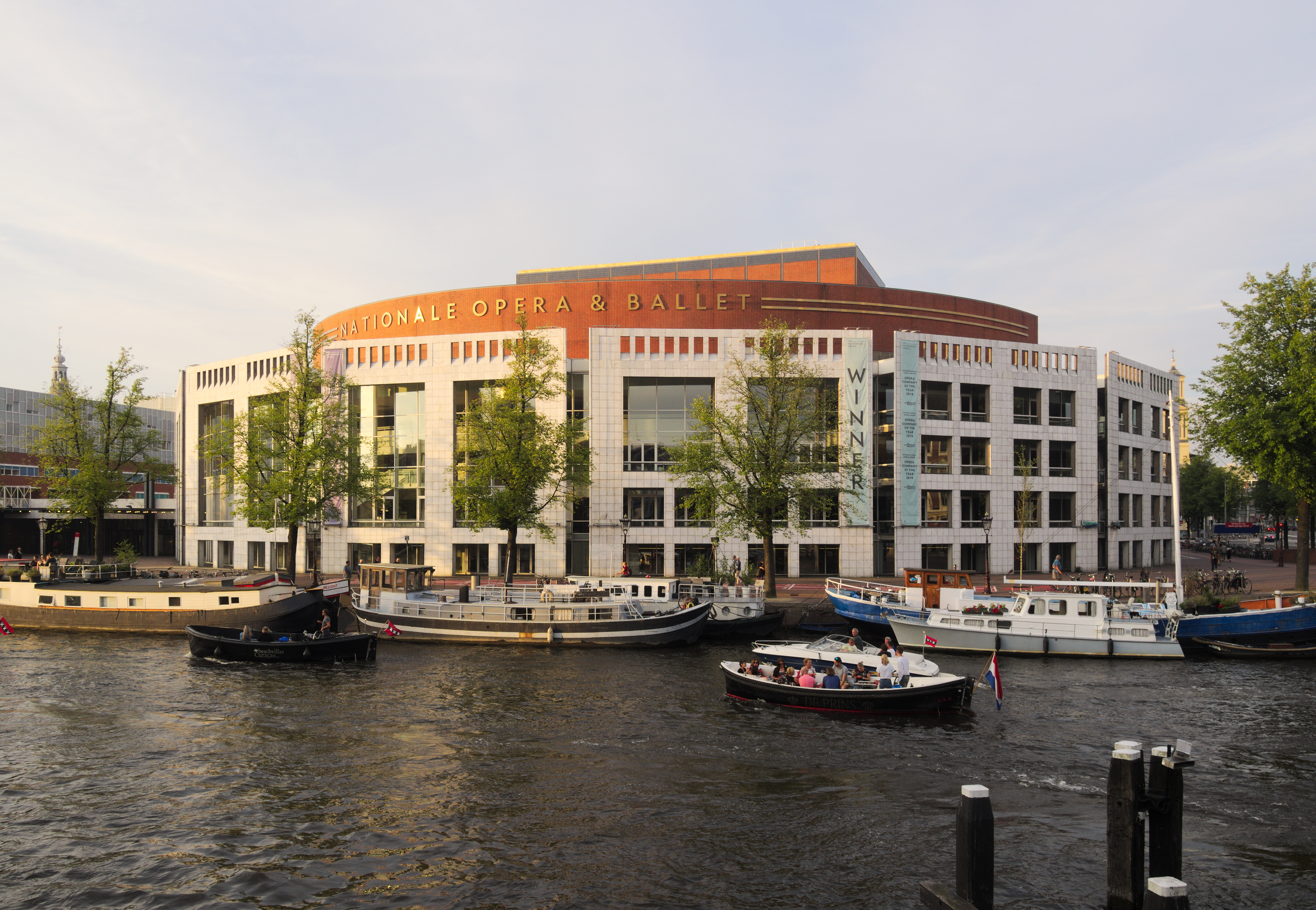
The Stopera

== Concert halls ==
- The Concertgebouw, home to the world-class symphony orchestra, the Royal Concertgebouw Orchestra.
- The Stopera, combined town hall and opera house.
- AFAS Live.
- Ziggo Dome.
- Paradiso, a rock-music venue and cultural centre.
- Melkweg, a pop-music venue and cultural centre.
- The Muziekgebouw aan 't IJ, specializing in contemporary classical music.
- The Bimhuis, for jazz and improvised music, located within the Muziekgebouw.

== Diamond factories ==
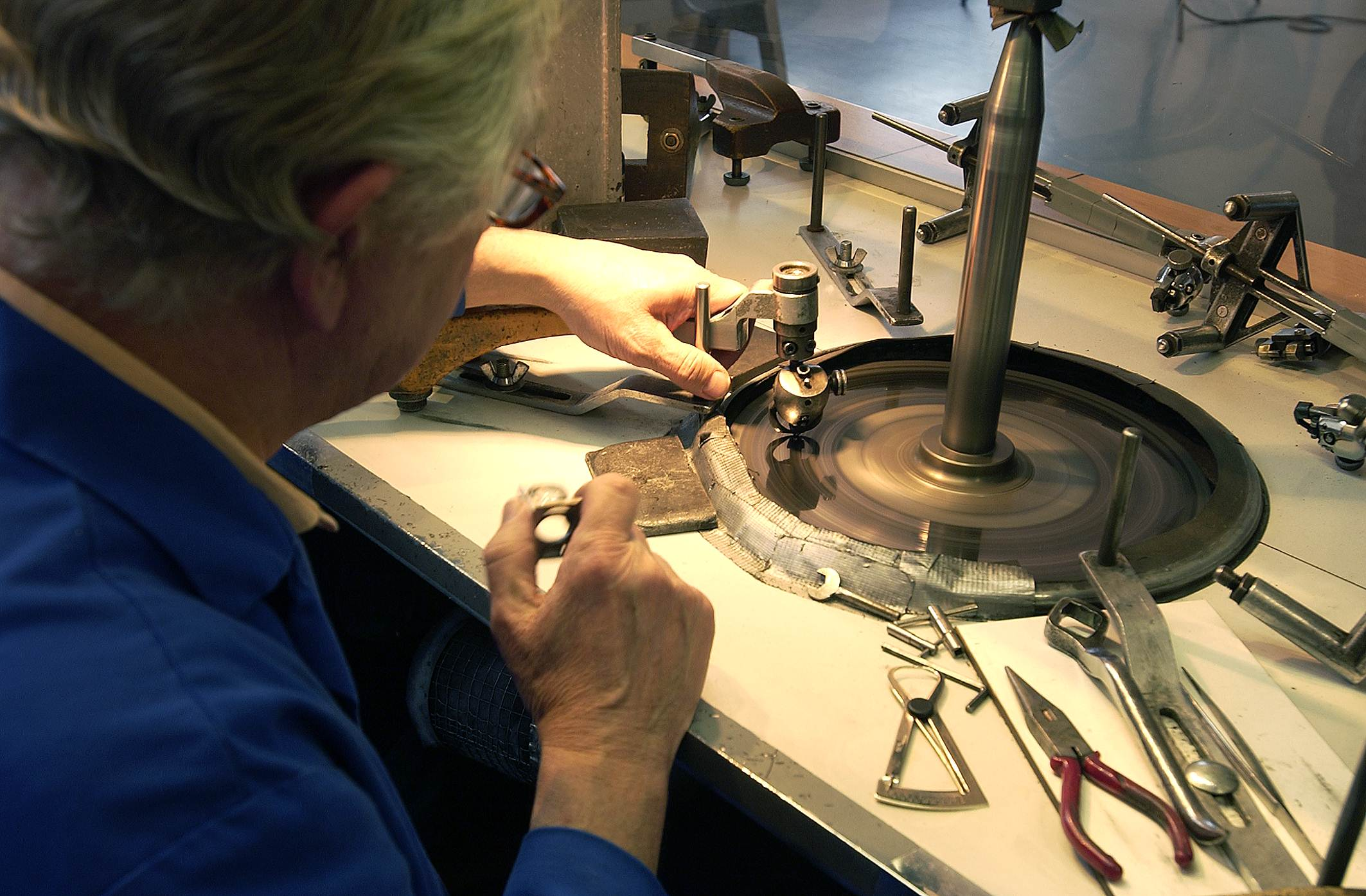
Diamond polisher

- Coster Diamonds, one of the oldest diamond polishing factories in the Netherlands

== Red-light districts ==
- De Wallen, located around the Oude Kerk

== Squares ==
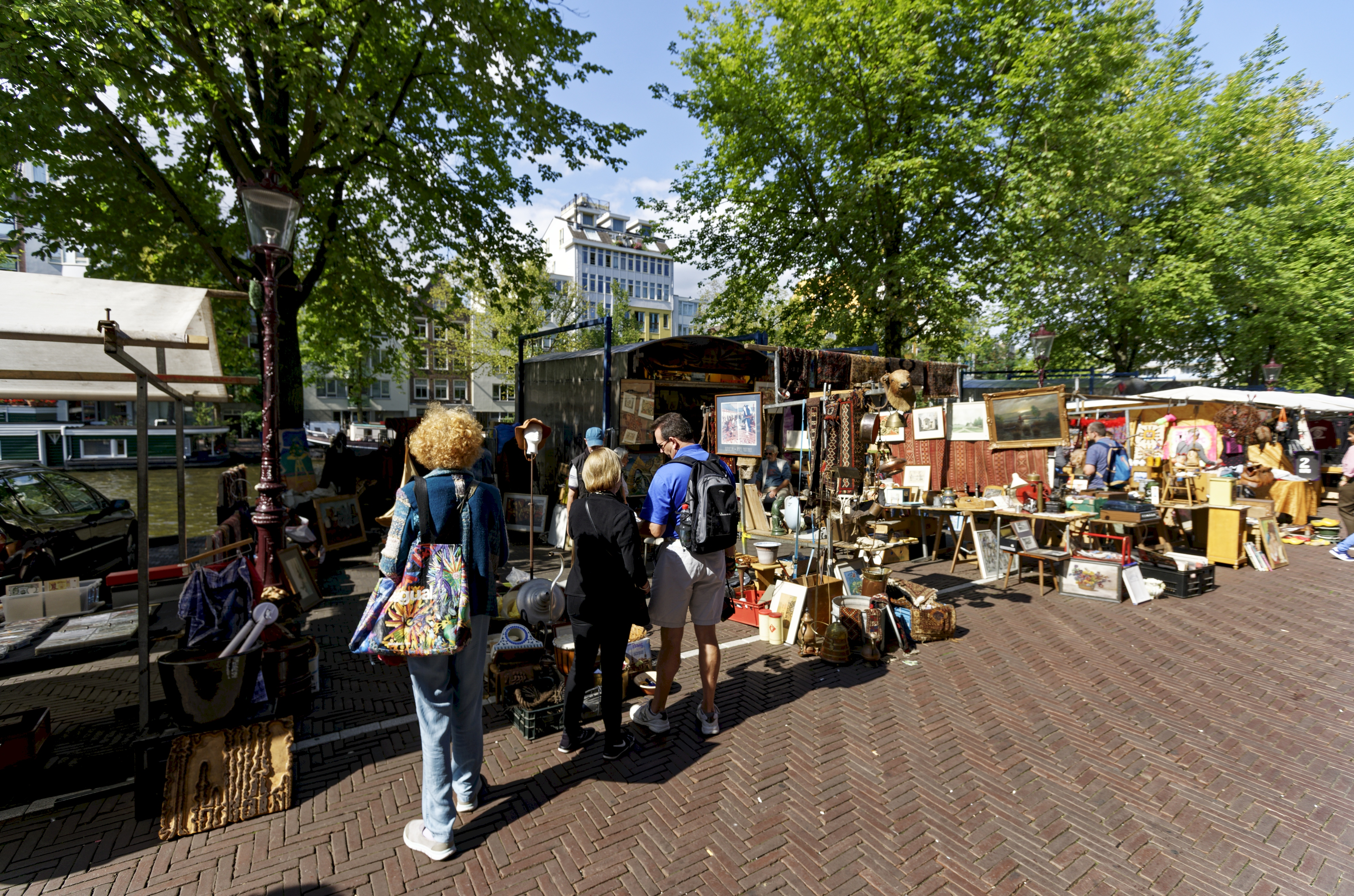
Waterlooplein

There are many squares (suffixed with plein) in Amsterdam. Here is a partial list of some of the better-known ones:

- The Dam, the central square of Amsterdam, where stands the Royal Palace on the Dam and the Netherlands National Monument.
- Koningsplein.
- Leidseplein, a plaza on the southwest end of the Leidsestraat.
- Muntplein, at the intersection of Kalverstraat and Rokin, a town square centered on the old Tower of the Mint (Munttoren).
- Museumplein, southwest of the Rijksmuseum, holds the Stedelijk Museum and the Van Gogh Museum.
- Rembrandtplein.
- Waterlooplein, south of the Rembrandt House Museum, the site of an open-air market.
- Markenplein, a place which holds Netherlands Film and Television Academy (NFTA), close by the Waterlooplein.

== Open-air markets ==
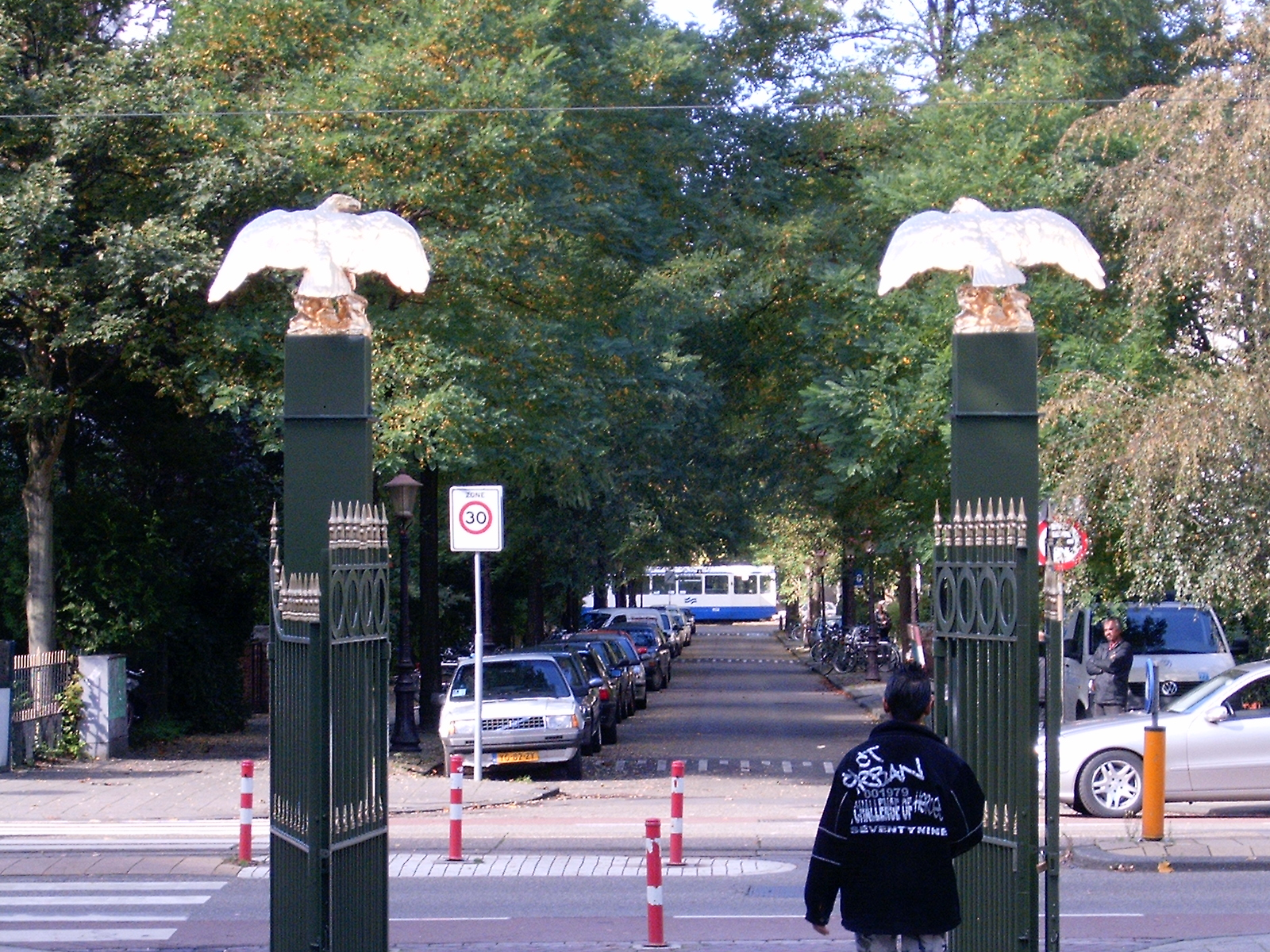
Entrance of Amsterdam Zoo

- Albert Cuyp Market, great open-air food market in the De Pijp district.
- Waterlooplein, south of the Rembrandt House Museum, the site of an open-air market.
- Dappermarkt, open-air food and clothing market in the Dapperbuurt district.
- Noordermarkt, Saturday market for organic food.
- Bloemenmarkt, the only floating flower market in the world.

== Breweries ==
- Heineken Brewery, located in the borough De Pijp. Now a museum.
- Brouwerij 't IJ, located at the foot of the beautiful De Gooyer windmill.
- Brouwerij de Prael, located at the Oudezijds Voorburgwal in the heart of the red-light district

== Zoos ==
- Artis, the oldest zoo in the Netherlands.

== Periodic events ==
- January - National Tulip Day, opening of the tulip season on Dam Square.
- April - (till 2013) Koninginnedag, Queen's day, 30 April, former Queen Juliana's birthday, also the day Juliana transferred her title to her daughter Beatrix.
- April - (from 2014) Koningsdag King's day, 27 April, King Willem Alexander's birthday.
- June - The Amsterdam Roots Festival, last week of June, an international music festival.
- June - Holland Festival is an international festival for theater, music, dance, opera, film, and art, throughout the month of June.
- August - Amsterdam Pride, the first weekend of August, gay pride weekend.
- August - Hartjesdag, 3rd weekend in August.
- August - Uitmarkt, last weekend in August, the start of the cultural season.
- August - Amsterdam Tournament, late August, International Football tournament hosted by AFC Ajax.
- August - Sail Amsterdam, a five-yearly event, when tall ships from all over the world can be visited; next event 2025.
- October - Amsterdam Marathon, mid-October.
- October - Amsterdam Dance Event, world's biggest electronic music conference and club festival, mid-October.
- October – The Bock Beer Festival in the Beurs van Berlage (Old Stock Exchange).
- October – Grachtenrace (Canal Race), 25 km rowing race, 2nd Saturday in October.
- November - Shadow Festival of Documentary Film.
- November – December The International Documentary Film Festival Amsterdam (IDFA).
- November - Cannabis Cup, mid-November annual cannabis competition, hosted by High Times.
- December - 1 December 2012. Amsterdam Showcase, International Art Fair at De Oude Kerk, Oudekerkseplein 23.

== Parks ==
- Amstelpark
- Amsterdamse Bos
- Beatrixpark
- Diemerpark
- Flevopark
- Frankendael
- Hortus Botanicus
- Oosterpark
- Rembrandtpark
- Sarphatipark
- Sloterpark
- Vliegenbos
- Vondelpark
- Wertheimpark
- Westerpark
