= Begijnhof Chapel, Amsterdam =

The Begijnhof Chapel
- Church of St John and St Ursula
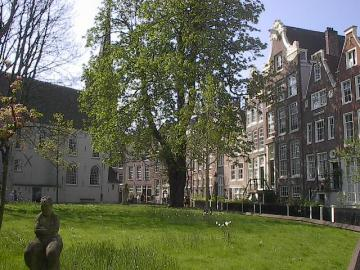
- The Begijnhof with the English Reformed Church, Amsterdam on the left and the Begijnhof Chapel on the right.
- The Begijnhof Chapel
- 52°22′9″N 4°53′23″E
- Location: Begijnhof 30; 1012 RM Amsterdam
- Country: Netherlands
- Denomination: Roman Catholic
- Website: https://begijnhofkapelamsterdam.nl/english-information/

Architecture
- Years built: 1665 (date the schuilkerk was founded)

Administration
- Diocese: Haarlem
- Parish: Amsterdam St Nicholas

The Begijnhof Chapel, dedicated to Saint John and Saint Ursula, is a Roman Catholic chapel run by the Congregation of the Blessed Sacrament, in the St Nicholas Parish of Amsterdam. It is located in a former schuilkerk in the Begijnhof across from its original location, the English Reformed Church, Amsterdam. The Miracle of Amsterdam is commemorated yearly with a procession starting from this church.

== History ==
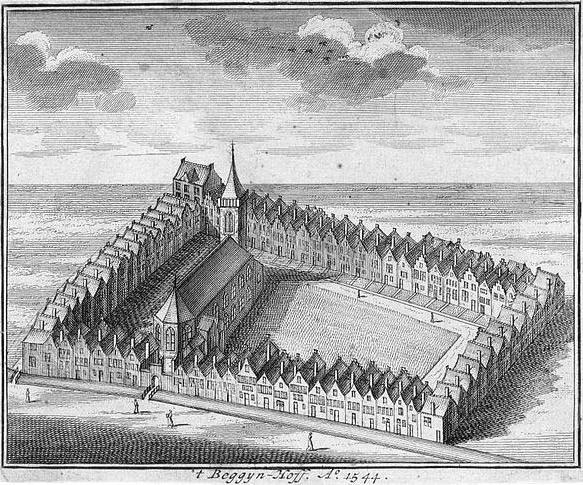
Situation sketch of the Beguinage ca.1544, historical engraving from 1729, unknown artist

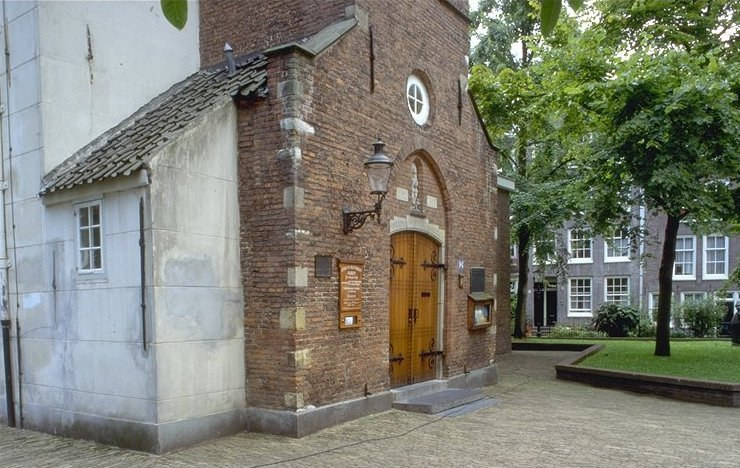
Original chapel door (now entrance to the English Reformed Church, Amsterdam)

Around 1150, a group of women came together to live in a religious community, primarily to look after the sick. These were the first 'Beguines’ although the name was not yet used. The women were not nuns and nor did they live in the seclusion of a convent. They had no founders nor did they make lifelong vows. They were unmarried women who made a vow of chastity and promised obedience to the parish priest, but since they were not expected to make a vow of poverty, they were free to dispose of their own possessions as they wished. They could renounce their vows at any moment and leave the Beguinage, for instance, to get married. We do not know exactly when the Beguinage was founded. According to the Amsterdam City Archives, the first time the word ‘beguines’ was used was in an official document of 1307 found in the accounts of the Bailiff of Amstelland. Another document, dated 31 July 1346, speaks of the Beghijnhuis (house of the Beguines) ceded to them by one Cope van der Laene on St Peter’s Eve.

== The church of the Beguines ==
As early as 1397 the Beguines had a small chapel dedicated to the Blessed Virgin Mary. On 17 October 1419, after the enlargement of the Beguinage, Matthias, titular Bishop of Biduane (a small town on the Adriatic), in his capacity as vicar-general of Frederic III, Bishop of Utrecht, solemnly consecrated a new chapel. This chapel, with its own burial ground, was dedicated to the Blessed Virgin Mary, Saint John the Evangelist and the apostle Matthew. The church was badly damaged during the two great fires of 23 April 1421 and 25 May 1452. After its restoration, it was re-dedicated. The Beguines themselves paid for the rebuilding and restoration. When a Beguine died, she was buried in the church, as was common at the time. There was, however, one special, well-known exception: Mistress Cornelia Arens. In her lifetime, the church had turned from a Catholic to a Protestant place of worship, and so she refused to be buried in it, asking to be placed in the ‘wide church path near the gutter’. Despite her wish, when she died on 14 October 1654, she was at first buried in the church and only on 2 May 1655 was she reburied against the church wall outside. Later on, because of work on this wall, her grave was moved to the edge of the bleaching field. Every year on 2 May, her grave is still adorned with flowers.

== The Alteration ==
Until 1578, Amsterdam was almost completely Roman Catholic, with two large parish churches, six chapels and many monasteries and convents. Every year the worship of the Sacrament of the Miracle drew thousands of pilgrims to the city for the yearly procession known as the Stille Omgang. A fair grew up alongside, ensuring a flourishing economy. In Amsterdam, the Protestant reformers were particularly opposed to the ‘idolatry’ of the Host and the ‘Roman Catholic concept’ of the Holy Mass. The Orangist Calvinists prevailed and on 26 May 1578, the Alteratie (transition of the municipality to the Protestant church) turned out badly for the Roman Catholics. In an unbloody revolution, the Protestants in Amsterdam took over power and the Catholic magistrates were dismissed. It was now strictly forbidden for Roman Catholics to openly profess their faith, which meant that all churches, monasteries and convents were confiscated by the authorities. The Amsterdam Protestant clergy were assiduous in denouncing every house used for "Paepse afgoderij" (Popish idolatry) to the authorities, but the authorities exercised a degree of restraint in acting on these denouncements. The Beguines, too, had to hand over the church in their courtyard. It was given to the English and has since been called the ‘English Reformed Church’. The Catholics established churches in their houses so that they could nevertheless profess their faith.

== The hidden church ==
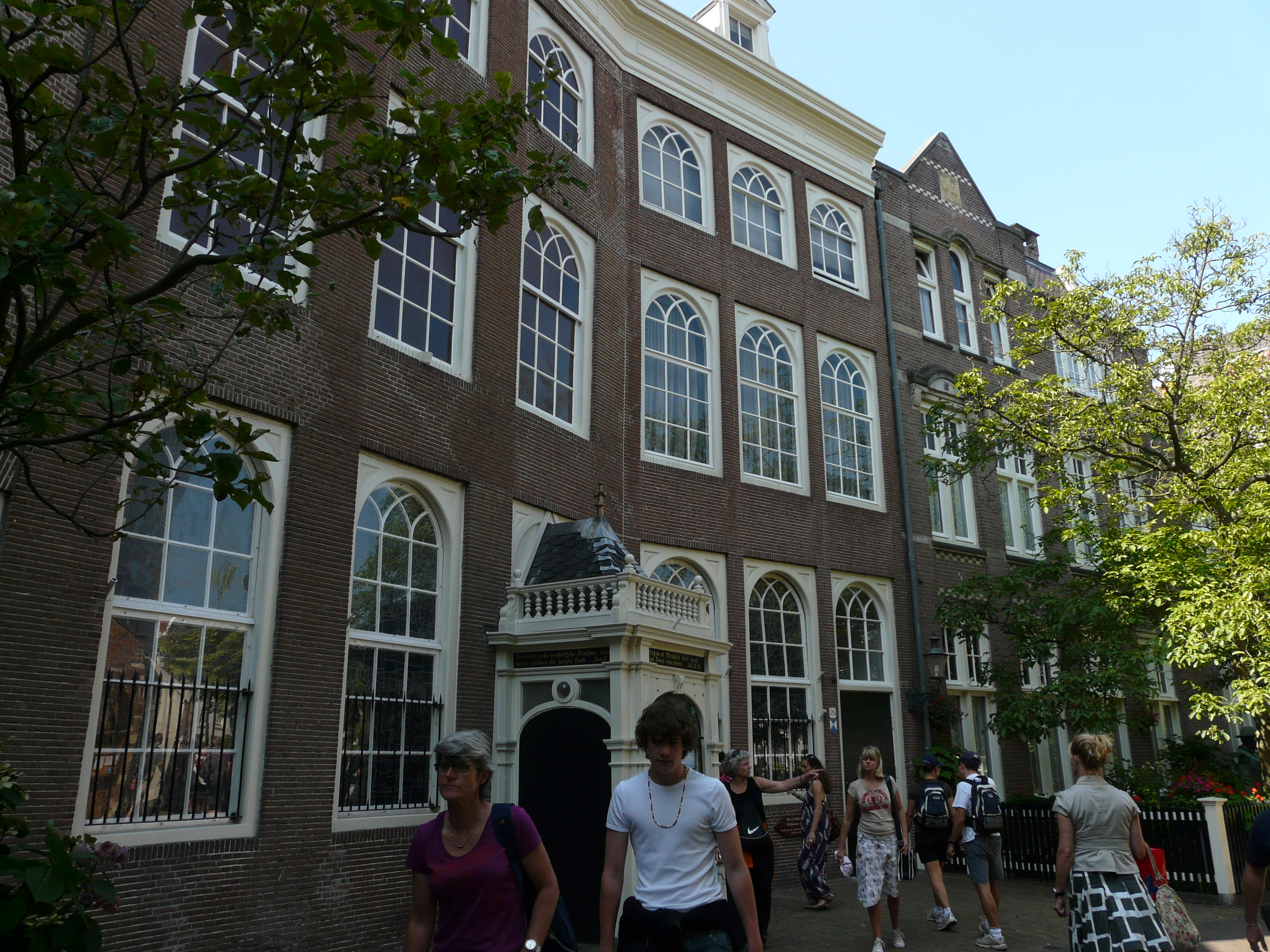
Entrance to the chapel is directly opposite to the entrance to the English Reformed Church

After the Beguines were obliged to surrender their church, they worshipped in the church sacristy, until this sacristy was in turn appropriated by the Protestant city council. Then they worshipped in one of the small houses in their hofje, not always the same one. The first steps in the construction of the present chapel were taken as early as 1665, after joining two of the hofje houses bought for that purpose at the initiative of parish priest Van der Mije (1665–1700); his nephew laid the foundation stone on 2 July 1671. The Protestant council members of the city of Amsterdam approved the building plans on condition that the building did not look like a church from the outside. The interior chapel was designed by the Catholic architect in Amsterdam, Philips Vingboons (1607–78), and was dedicated to St John the Evangelist and St Ursula. In its present form, it has a gallery with a left and a right section, resting on six wooden columns. The main altar has a painting depicting the Miracle of Amsterdam. Two side-altars have paintings by Claes Corneliszoon Moeyaert. The current facade with its gothic-style leaded ogive windows dates only from the 19th century. When the present chapel was opened in 1682, 150 Beguines and 12 widows or single women lived in the Beguinage. The chapel has undergone many changes. It was extended considerably to the right and the Beguines were given their own side chapel on the left. The façade was renewed and accessibility improved by building a porch. The interior of the chapel also underwent various changes in respect to the paintings, lamps, tabernacle, statues, and windows.

But throughout, the eucharistic reflection, prayer and silence were central.
