= Heiligeweg =

Street in Amsterdam

Coordinates: 52.3677°N 4.8908°E

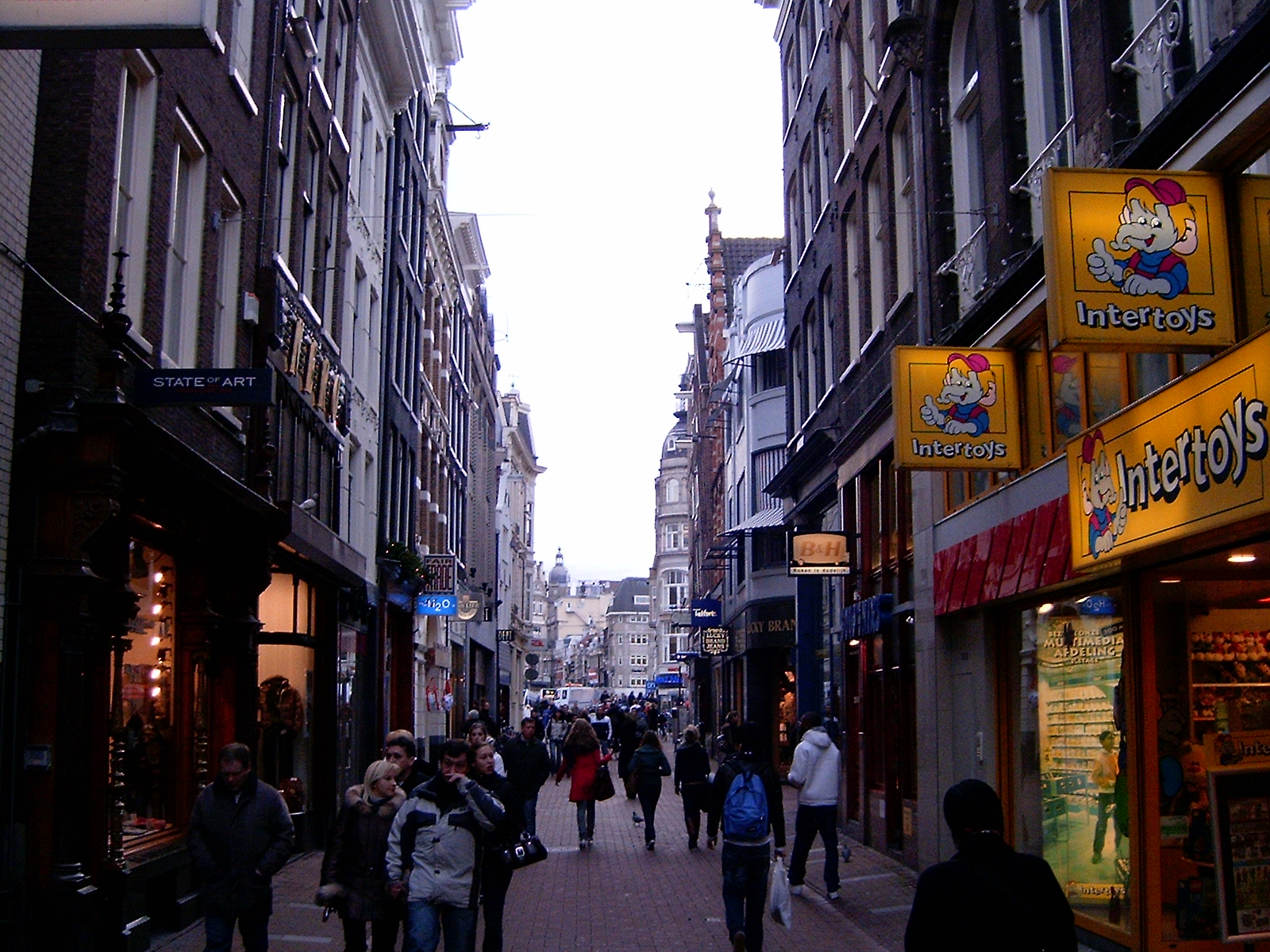
Heiligeweg

The Heiligeweg (Dutch - Holy Street or Holy Way) is the street in Amsterdam that used to lead from the Kapel ter Heilige Stede (Chapel of the Holy Site, a pilgrimage chapel on the site where the 1345 Miracle of Amsterdam occurred) to the Kalverstraat. Increasing numbers of pilgrims to this shrine made necessary a new street leading from Sloten to the shrine, and this new street became known as the Holy Way.

Between the Kalverstraat and the Singel may be seen part of the Holy Way in its original medieval form, for constructions built during medieval city expansion may be found here, outside the Holy Way Gate). The way continued roughly along the line of the present Leidsestraat, and further, via the (now lost) Heiligewegse Vaart (later called the Overtoomse Vaart, and since 1902, just the Overtoom). From the Overtoom via the Schinkel the Heiligeweg went on via the Sloterkade and Sloterstraatweg (now the Rijnsburgstraat and Sloterweg) to Sloten. The sections between Sloten and Haarlem has been eaten up by the Haarlemmermeer. Much of the route between Sloten and the Overtoomse Sluis is still present (Sloterweg and Sloterkade). A large part has vanished due to the construction of a business park.

Up to around 1500 this was one of the most important overland routes between Amsterdam and Kennemerland and, from there, with the rest of Holland. In 1904 electric tram number 1 replaced the horse-drawn tram from Leidscheplein – Amstelveenscheweg that had run since 1877. Today the Holy Street is a shopping street connecting the two popular shopping streets Kalverstraat and Leidsestraat to each other. Halfway along the Heiligeweg may be found the Voetboogstraat with its 1603 Rasphuispoortje.
