= Begijnhof, Amsterdam =

One of the oldest inner courts in the city of Amsterdam

Coordinates: 52.3694°N 4.8901°E

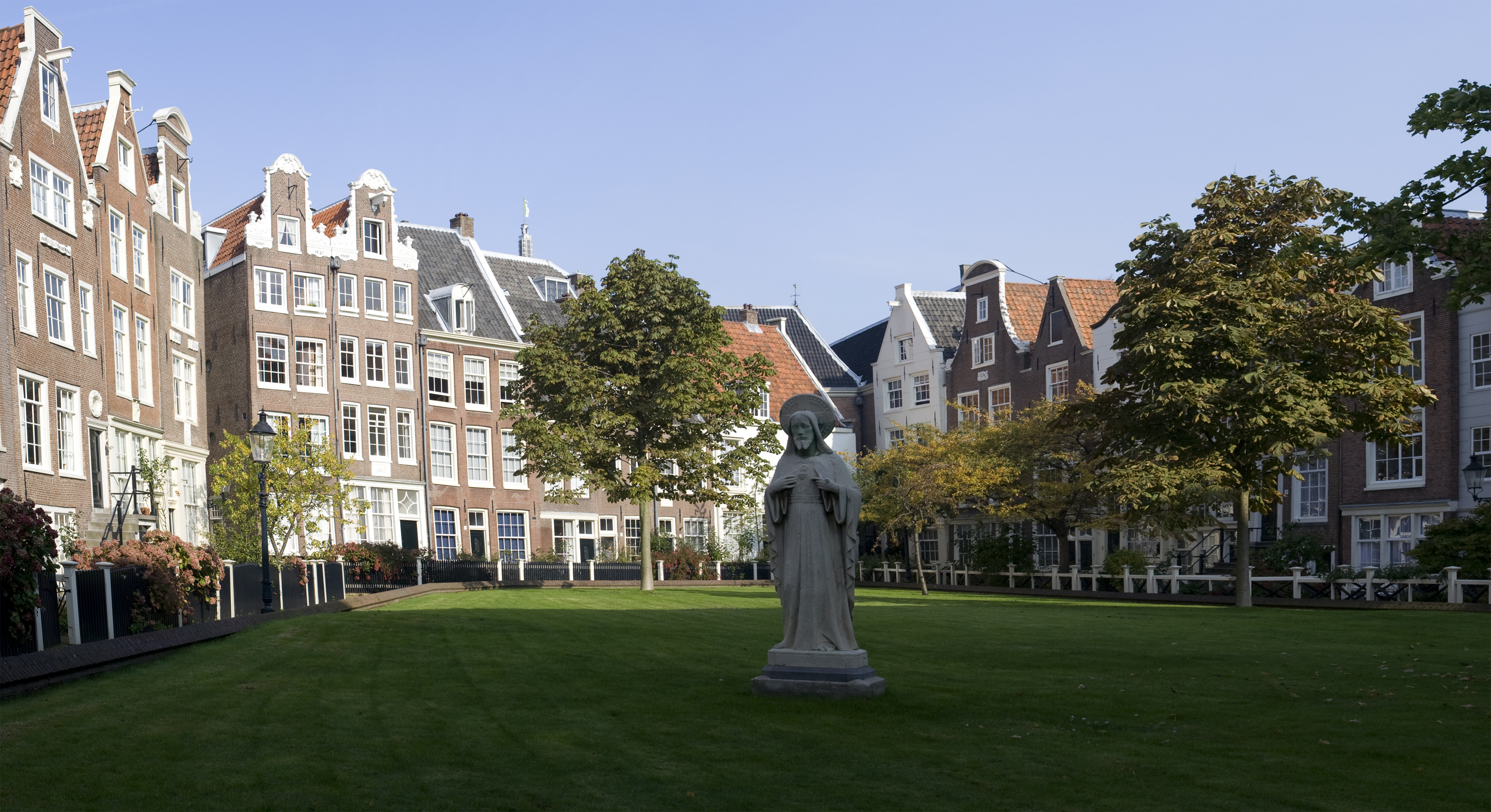
The Begijnhof of Amsterdam

The Begijnhof is one of the oldest hofjes in Amsterdam, Netherlands. A group of historic buildings, mostly private dwellings, centre on it. As the name suggests, it was originally a béguinage. Today it is also the site of two churches, the Catholic Miracle Church and the English Reformed Church.

== Earliest times ==
The Begijnhof is the only inner court in Amsterdam which was founded during the Middle Ages, and therefore lies within the Singel — the innermost canal of Amsterdam's circular canal system. The Begijnhof is at medieval street level, which means a meter below the rest of the old city center.

It is unclear when exactly the Begijnhof (Beguines' court) was founded. In 1346, the beguines still lived in a house (a document of that time mentioned one beghynhuys). A courtyard was only first mentioned in 1389, probably after the religious status of the city rose due to the Amsterdam Eucharistic Miracle of 1345.

Originally the Begijnhof was entirely encircled by water (the Nieuwezijds Voorburgwal, the Spui and the Begijnensloot or "Beguines' Ditch"), with the sole entrance located at the Begijnensteeg ("Beguines' Alley"), which had a bridge across the Begijnensloot. The back facades were therefore water-locked. The Spui entrance only dates back to the 19th century.

== Characteristics ==
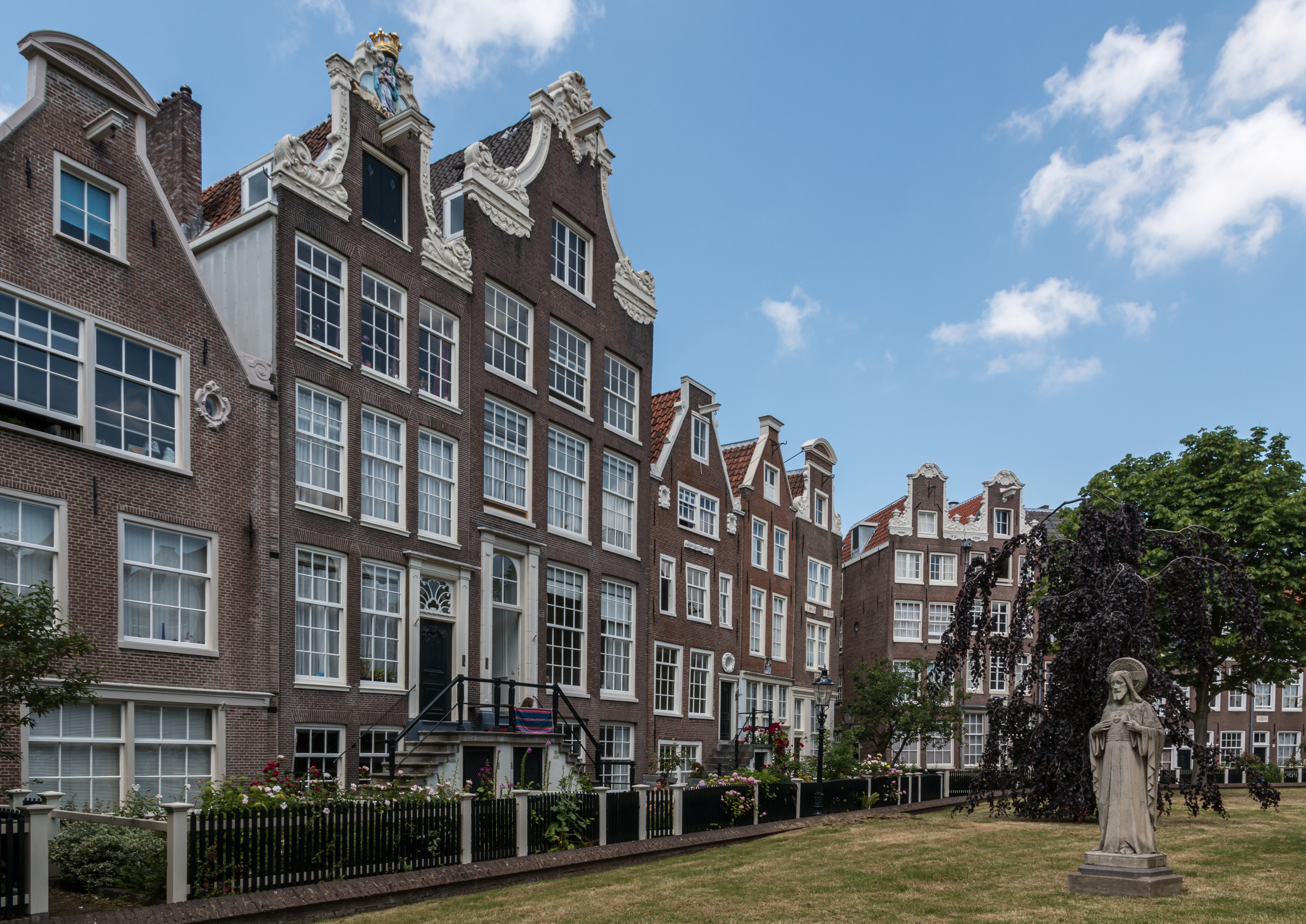
Begijnhof, 2015

The Begijnhof differs from the usual Amsterdam patricians' court in that this old people's home was not founded by private persons. It bore closer resemblance to a convent, although the beguines enjoyed greater freedom than nuns in a convent. While beguines took a vow of chastity, and while they considered themselves obliged to attend Holy Mass every day and pray various official prayers, they were free to leave the court at any time in order to get married.

=== Tall Amsterdam houses ===
The buildings in the court are tall, characteristically Amsterdam-style town-houses, emphasising the court's relatively private character. The Begijnhof is the only court whose houses have addresses bearing the name of the court itself. Unlike most courts, the houses here do not form rows joining one dwelling with another; instead, there are 47 regular town houses, each with its individual aspect, and most of them with facades from the 17th and 18th centuries. However, the buildings themselves are usually of earlier date, eighteen of them still possessing a Gothic wooden framework.

=== The Wooden House ===
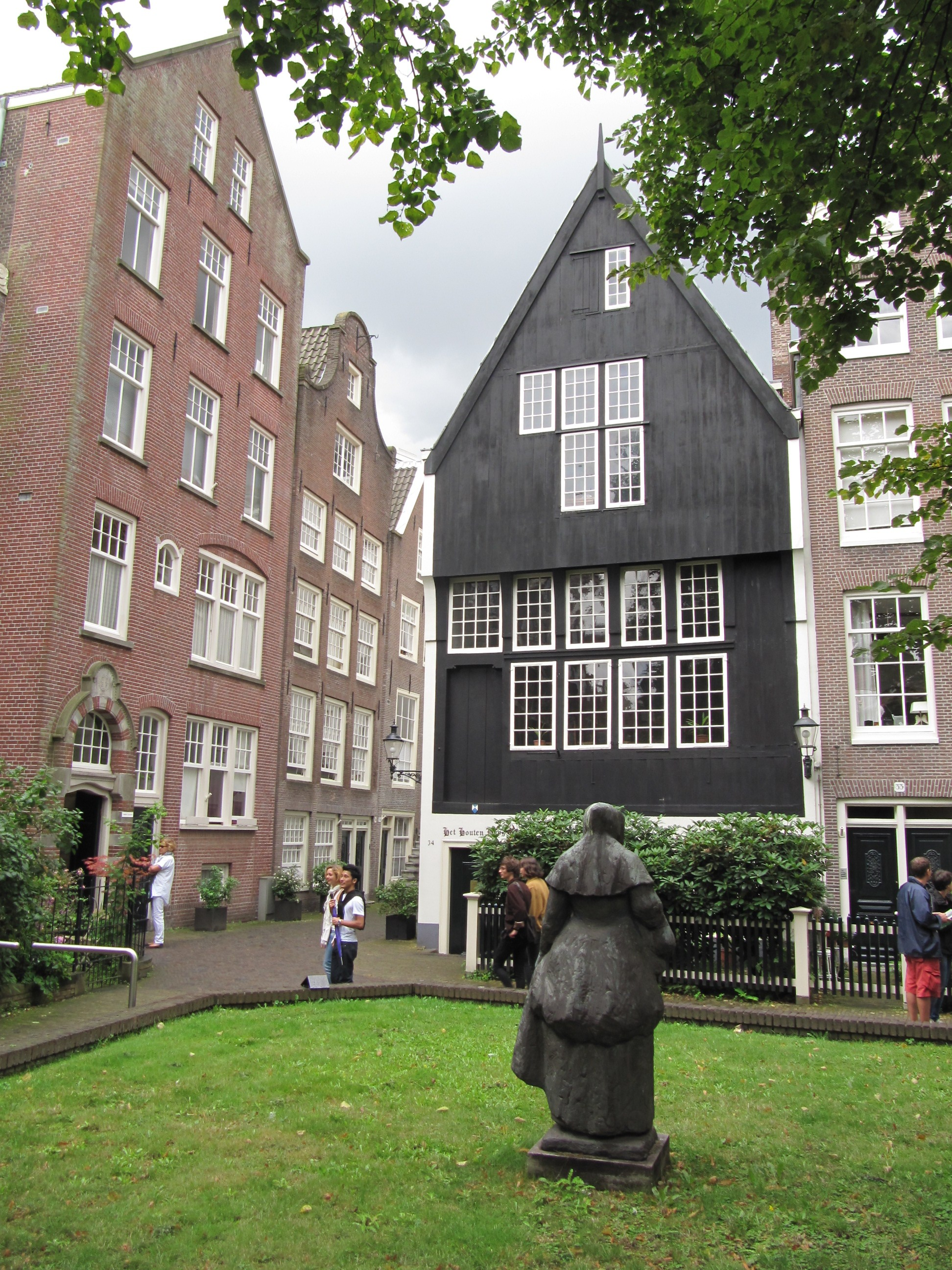
The Wooden House

The ancient, restored wooden house (Het Houten Huys, 34 Begijnhof) is famous as one of the two wooden houses still existing in the center of Amsterdam (the other one being Zeedijk 1); there are annexed villages like Nieuwendam (Amsterdam North) with many wooden houses and even a wooden church. This house dates from about 1420, and is the oldest wooden house in Amsterdam.

The courtyard has two bleaching greens, one on each side of the chapel.

=== Gates ===
The old Begijnesloot gate, restored in 1907, dates from 1574 and has a gable stone depicting Saint Ursula, patron saint of the Amsterdam beguines. The Spui gate from about 1725 was replaced by the present gatehouse in the 19th century. The Begijnhof has a great number of gable stones, many of which show a strong Roman Catholic character.

== Religious strife ==
After the Alteration (Protestant takeover) of 1578, when Amsterdam came under Calvinist rule, the Begijnhof was the only Roman Catholic institution to be allowed to remain in existence. This was because the houses were the beguines' private property. The Chapel, however, was closed and lay empty for around 30 years before being ceded to the English Presbyterians, and since that time has been alluded to as the "English Church". Several of the pulpit panels were designed by Piet Mondrian.

=== A clandestine church ===
In 1671, the architect Philip Vingboons converted two dwellings opposite the Chapel entrance into a schuilkerk, or conventicle church, for Catholics, the Church of the Saints John and Ursula, named after the patron saints of the Begijnhof. This church was kept secret, as was demanded by the city government, and could not be recognized as a church from the outside. In 1908 this became the Miracle Church, after the original Miracle Church had been deliberately destroyed by its Protestant owners.

=== Buried in the gutter ===
The most famous beguine in the Begijnhof's history is sister Cornelia Arens, who died on 14 October 1654. (Her date of birth is unknown, but she professed the vows of chastity and the Catholic faith on 6 July 1621.) Rather than be laid to rest in the Chapel, which she considered "desecrated" by Presbyterians, she chose to be buried in the gutter of the court. Legend has it that contrary to her wish, she was in fact buried in the Chapel, but her coffin was found in the adjoining gutter the following day. This happened on two more occasions, until she was at last laid to rest in the gutter. Another version of the legend is that her soul found no peace and roamed the court at night until she was buried in the gutter.

=== The last beguine ===
"Sister Antonia", whose original name was Agatha Kaptein, was born on 13 April 1887 at Akersloot. The last beguine, she died on 23 May 1971 at the age of 84. She was buried in the Sisters' Grave in the St. Barbara's Roman Catholic Cemetery in Amsterdam on 26 May of the same year.

== Renovation ==
Until its renovation in 1979, the court had 140 dwellings — some 110 of them consisting of a single room, and about 25 comprising two. The occupants likewise numbered 140. The renovations enlarged the houses to two or three rooms. Since that time, the number of female inhabitants has been an unvaried 105.

== See also ==
- Beguines and Beghards
