= Kalverstraat =

Street in Amsterdam, Netherlands

Coordinates: 52°22′11″N 4°53′28″E

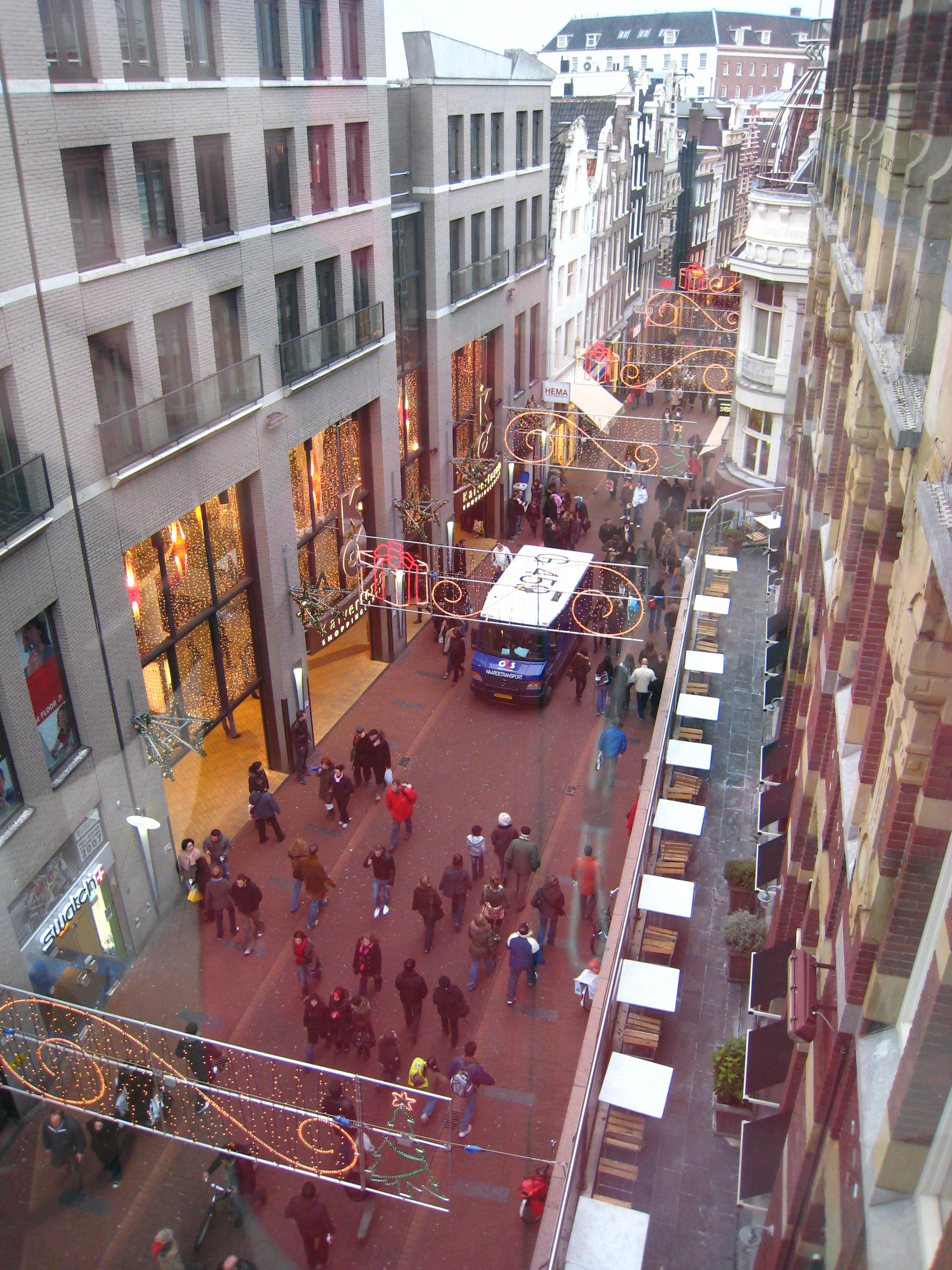
Kalverstraat, with the main entrance to Kalvertoren shopping centre.

The Kalverstraat (Dutch pronunciation: [ˈkɑlvərˌstraːt], locally [ˈkaləvərˌstrɑːt]) is a busy shopping street of Amsterdam, the capital of the Netherlands. The street runs roughly North-South for about 750 meters, from Dam Square to Muntplein square.

The Kalverstraat is the most expensive shopping street in the Netherlands, with rents of up to 3000 euros per square meter (2016). In 2009 it was the 17th most expensive street in the world measured by rent prices. The Kalverstraat is also the most expensive street in the Dutch version of Monopoly.

The Amsterdam Museum is located in a former orphanage between Kalverstraat and Nieuwezijds Voorburgwal.

== History ==
After the construction of the medieval city walls, the street between Munttoren (originally a gate in the city walls) and Spui square came to be known as Byndewyck. The street later became known as Kalverstraat ("calf street"), after the cattle market that was held here from 1486 until 1629.

In 1345 a eucharistic miracle was said to have taken place in a home between the Kalverstraat in the Rokin. The event is commemorated by the annual Stille Omgang procession. A chapel, the Heilige Stede, was built on the spot where the miracle was said to have occurred. The Heiligeweg connected the Kalverstraat with this pilgrim chapel, and with Leidsestraat.

Painter Piet Mondrian lived at Kalverstraat 154 from 1892 to 1895. The first HEMA department store opened on the Kalverstraat in 1926. On May 7, 1945, drunk German soldiers shooting from the windows of a building at the corner of Kalverstraat and Dam square killed 19 civilians celebrating their liberation from the Nazis and the end of World War II. A fire in the Kalverstraat on May 9, 1977, claimed 33 lives.

== See also ==
- List of streets in Amsterdam
