= Heilige Stede =

Former church building in Amsterdam, Netherlands

Coordinates: 52°22′12.9″N 4°53′31.1″E

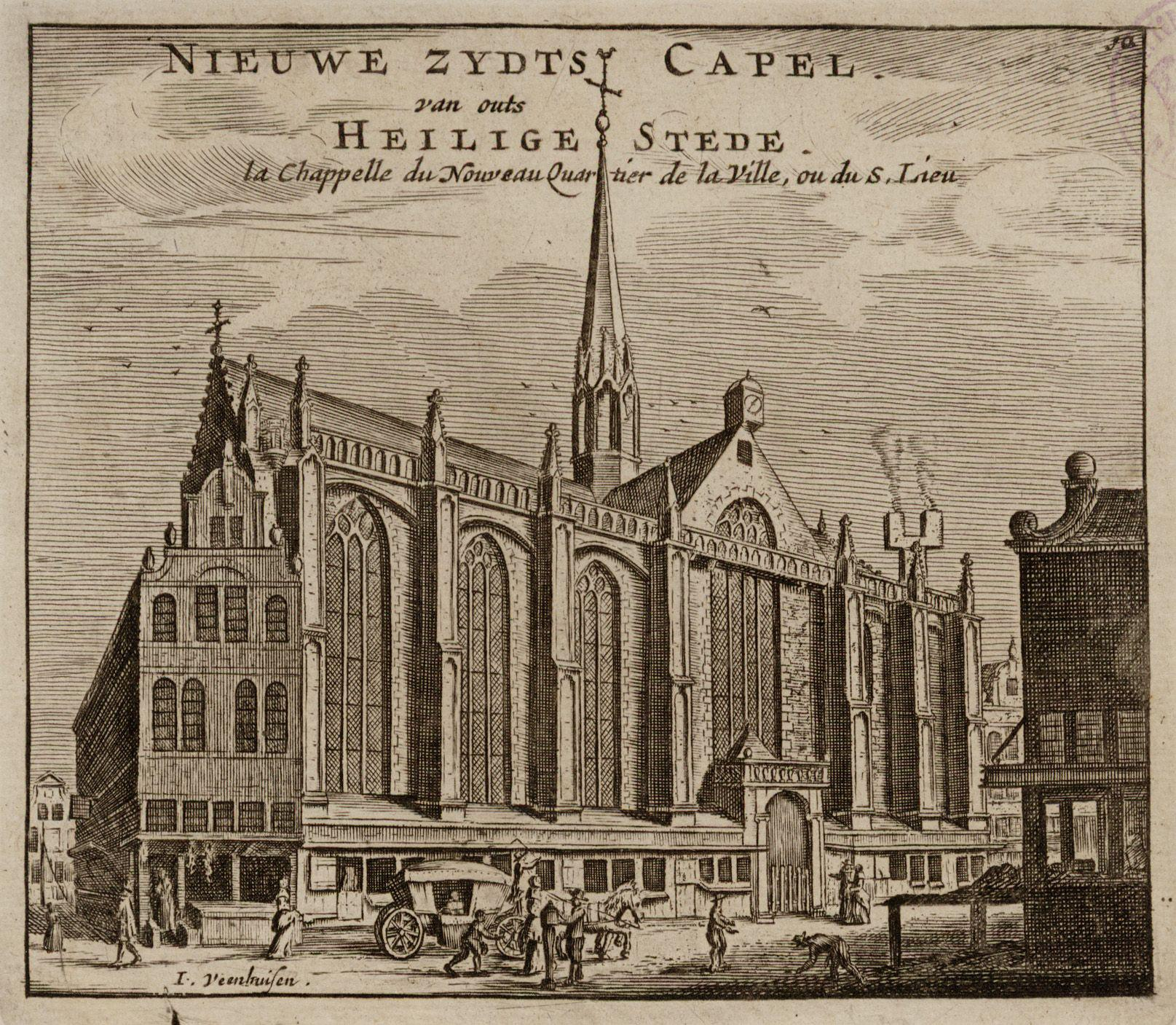
Nieuwezijds Kapel 1664–1665

Nieuwezijds Kapel (Dutch - New Side's Chapel), or Heilige Stede (Dutch - holy site) or Chapel of the Heilige Stede refers to a site in Amsterdam that includes shops and a Dutch Reformed church built in 1908 on the site of a church once called the Heilige Stede, originally built in the 15th century to replace a chapel that burned in a city fire of 1452. That original chapel had been built in 1347 as a result of the miracle of Amsterdam (15 March 1345), located on the Kalverstraat where this miracle with the eucharistic host occurred.

After the Miracle of Amsterdam in 1345, the consecrated Host was brought by a priest to the clergy of the church Oude Kerk, which at the time served as the principal parish church of the city. The site of the miracle later became known as the Nieuwezijds Kapel, also called the Heilige Stede (“Holy Site”), which developed into an important pilgrimage destination during the Middle Ages.

Following the Reformation, the suppression of Catholic worship in Amsterdam and the destruction of the chapel associated with the miracle, the fate of the consecrated Host associated with the Miracle of Amsterdam is unknown, and it disappears from the historical record.

Nevertheless, despite the suppression of public Catholic devotion following the Reformation, remembrance of the Eucharistic miracle continues through the annual Stille Omgang (Silent Procession), held each March annually to commemorate the event.

== History ==
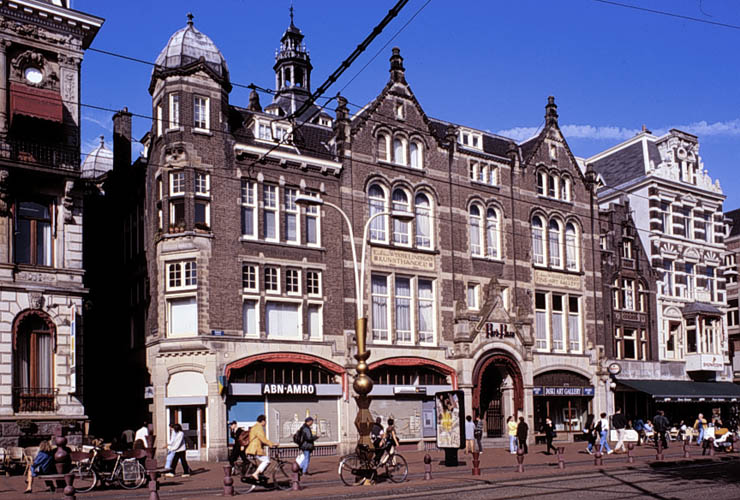
Storefronts on the Rokin today that were built as part of the complex in 1908, behind them the church tower can be seen

In the beeldenstorm of 1566 the chapel was severely damaged, and after the Alteratie, the chapel came into Protestant hands, when it was renamed the Nieuwezijds Chapel by them. The yearly procession that until then had taken place by the Catholics, was forbidden. In 1881, this tradition was reinstated as the Stille Omgang.

The building was deconstructed in 1908, after the Protestant church fathers decided to consolidate the space and sell off the surrounding land to generate income. At that period the Catholic Church was enjoying a surge in popularity and the Protestants were determined not to "give them back their church grounds". The various sections of the old church outside the part left for the modern chapel, were stripped of useful materials, to prevent them ever being used again for Catholic worship, and the ground was sold for the construction of shops, so that the Catholics could never have it back. The miracle church's function had already long been taken over by the Roman Catholic schuilkerk at the Amsterdam Beguinage. Despite these measures, the site still has many parts of the old church intact, and the cultural history of the entire site is important for the city of Amsterdam.

Parts of the chapel are still to be found in the Enge Kapelsteeg and on the roof of the schuilkerk De Papegaai in the Kalverstraat. A few fragments of the chapel came to be on the Frankendael in the Watergraafsmeer. On the Rokin was erected the Mirakelkolom (miracle column), though this was disassembled and raised for the construction of the North-south line of the Amsterdam Metro. The entire site is considered a Rijksmonument, except for certain parts of the interior such as the modern organ.
