= Millennium Tower (Amsterdam) =

Office building in Amsterdam, Netherlands

Coordinates: 52.393333°N 4.837222°E

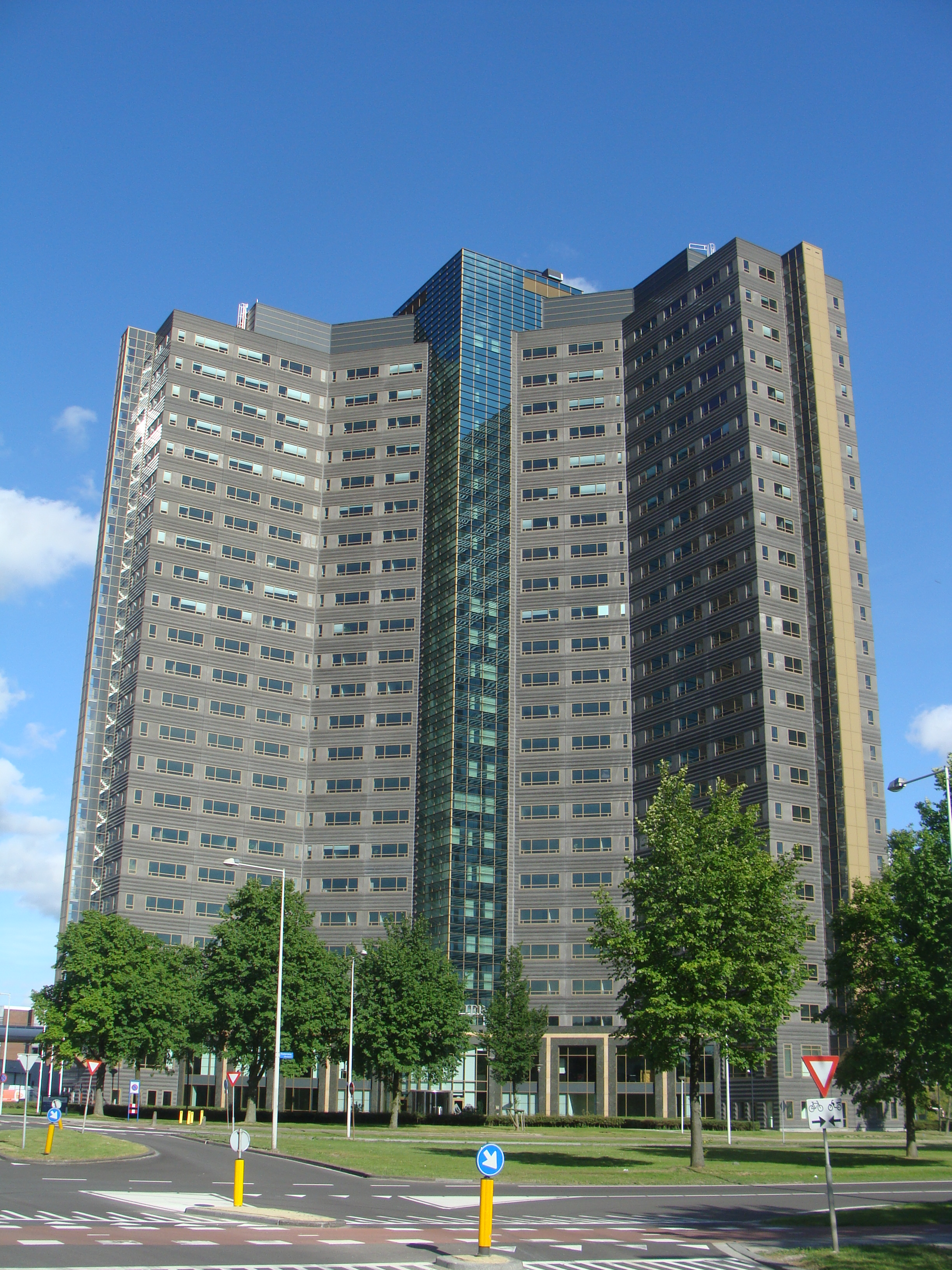
Millennium Tower Amsterdam

Millennium Tower is a 97.5-metre (320 ft), 24-storey office building in Amsterdam constructed from 2002 and completed in 2004.
