= Frankendael =

Country estate the Netherlands

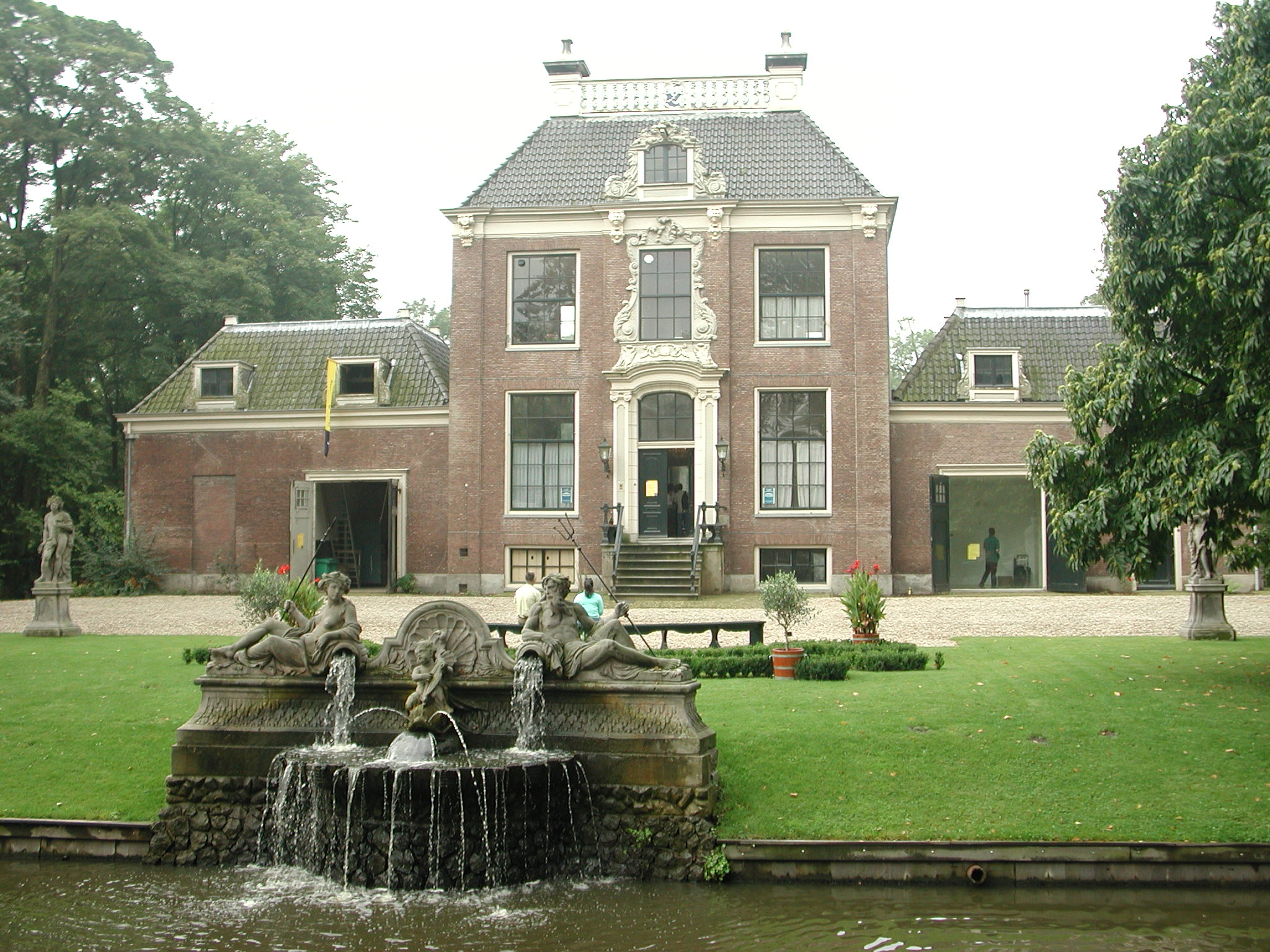
- Façade of Huis Frankendael
- Interactive map of the Frankendael area

General information
- Status: In use
- Type: Buitenplaats (country estate), used as a restaurant, meeting room, wedding location
- Architectural style: Dutch Louis XIV style
- Location: Amsterdam-Oost, Netherlands, Middenweg 72
- Coordinates: 52°21′04″N 4°56′00″E
- Current tenants: Public building
- Named for: Frankenthal
- Construction started: Circa 1650–1690
- Completed: 1733
- Renovated: 1950s
- Owner: Municipality of Amsterdam

Technical details
- Material: Stone

Design and construction
- Architects: Jacob Otten Husly, Ben Merkelbach

Website
- huizefrankendael.nl

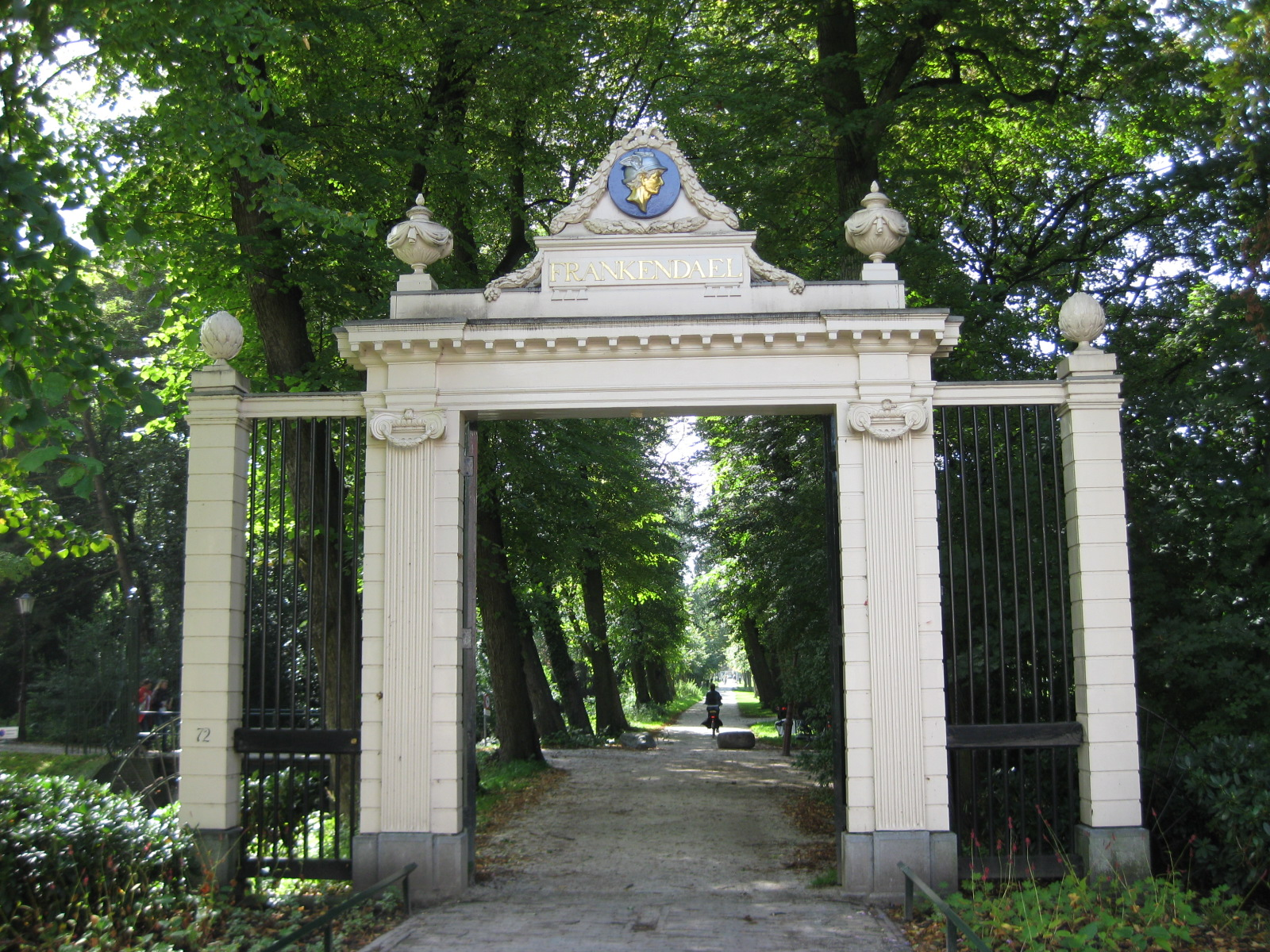
Entrance to the estate

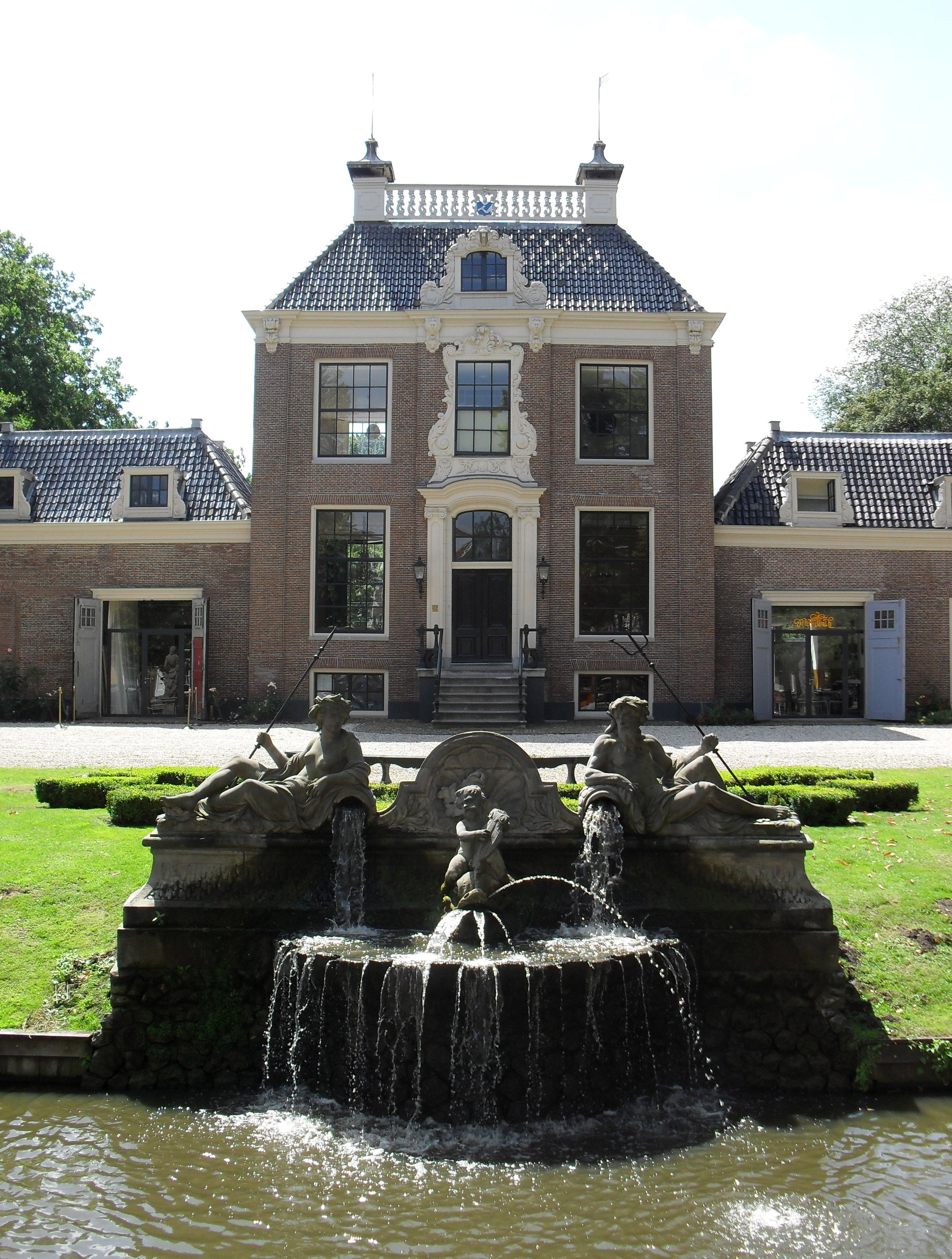
The facade of Huize Frankendael with the fountain

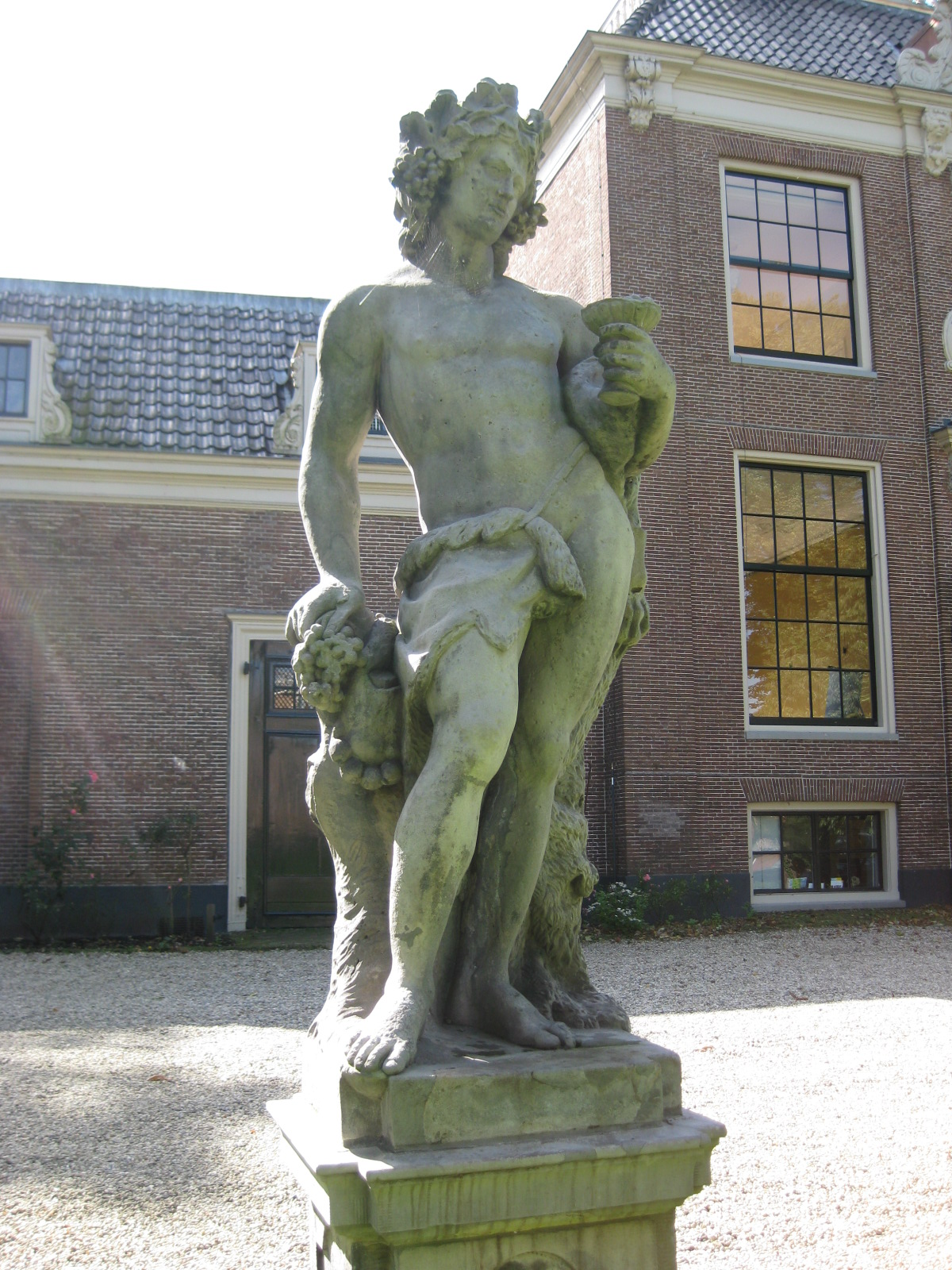
Sculpture depicting the god Bacchus in Frankendael

Frankendael is one of two remaining buitenplaats (country estates) in Amsterdam (the other is Amstelrust). It comprises Huis Frankendael and the adjoining Park Frankendael in Watergraafsmeer. The house (Huis Frankendael), located at Middenweg 72, is a historic country residence in Tuindorp Frankendaal (Amsterdam-Oost). It was probably built largely between the second half or end of the 17th century and around 1733. It is a Rijksmonument, and owned by the municipality of Amsterdam. The building houses a restaurant and rooms that are used for various events.

== History ==
The original building was probably built around 1659.

In the early 18th century, the house was inhabited by Izaak Balde, who had become the owner of the estate in 1695. Balde named the estate Frankendael, a name derived from Frankenthal, a place of refuge for Protestants near Worms, where his grandfather had found hospitality.

The construction of the building continued until 1733, when Huize Frankendael took on its current appearance.

After that, until 1759, the owner of the estate was Jan Gildemeester. Then, from 1779, the owner of Frankendael was Jan Gildemeester Janszoon. In 1783, he commissioned the Amsterdam architect Jacob Otten Husly designed the Entrance Gate (Toegangspoort Frankendael).

At the front of the house at the canal is a marble fountain that was purchased in 1770 and originally came from the Driemond country estate near Weesp.

The building was permanently inhabited until the early 19th century. Between 1849 and 1866, Pieter Proot resided in Frankendael and held parties and banquets there.

Later, in 1866, the Frankendael estate was acquired by the Nederlandsche Tuinbouw Maatschappij Linnaeus, who converted the rooms of the building into offices.

Between 1927 and 1956, the gardens of the villa hosted open-air theatre performances in the summer.

Meanwhile, in the early 1950s, restoration and refurbish work of the dilapidated house was undertaken under the direction of architect Ben Merkelbach. The municipality of Amsterdam then offered Ben Merkelbach the opportunity to use Frankendael as his personal office in 1957. The estate was subsequently inhabited by Merkelbach's descendants until 2004. His stepdaughter Cecilia Lichtveld was the last resident of the house.

The Garden Village Frankendael (Tuindorp Frankendael/Jeruzalem (Amsterdam)), built shortly after World War II, borders the country estate and is named after it.

== Present ==
The carriage house houses a restaurant named after Ben Merkelbach. Couples can get married at this special location, as this place is an official wedding location.

In 2008, archaeological research revealed the possible foundations of the old orangery of the country estate to the west in the backyard.

== Architecture ==
=== Exterior ===
The estate extends over an area of approximately 7 acres in the vicinity of the Wereldmuseum.

At the entrance there is a wooden portico (see the "History" section), which bears the coat of arms of Jan Gildemeester Janszoon. The facade of the main building is in red brick.

In front of the main facade there is a fountain made in 1714 by the sculptor Ignatius van Logteren. In the front of the villa, there are also four statues from the early 18th century, perhaps brought to Frankendael by one of its owners, Jan Gildemeester.

In the back of the villa, there is a garden in English style.

=== Interior ===
The rooms of Huize Frankendael are decorated in Louis XIV style.

== Related articles ==
- List of tourist attractions in Amsterdam
