= Kalvertoren =

- Kalverpassage
- Location: Kalverstraat, Amsterdam, Netherlands
- Coordinates: 52°22′03″N 4°53′30″E
- Developer: Multi Corporation
- Num. of stores: ~45–50
- Num. of anchor tenants: 2
- Website: kalverpassage.nl

The Kalvertoren, a shopping center in Amsterdam, is located on Kalverstraat, Amsterdam's busiest shopping street.

The project was developed by Multi Corporation. In 1998, the shopping centre tower won the annual European Shopping Centre Award that is presented by the ICSC, the International Council of Shopping Centres.

The glass and steel tower has a staircase, an escalator and a glass lift, ferrying customers to the top. From the restaurant on the top floor (named Blue°), one has a view of Amsterdam's inner city. Besides many shops, it is also home to two department stores, various cafes and a restaurant.

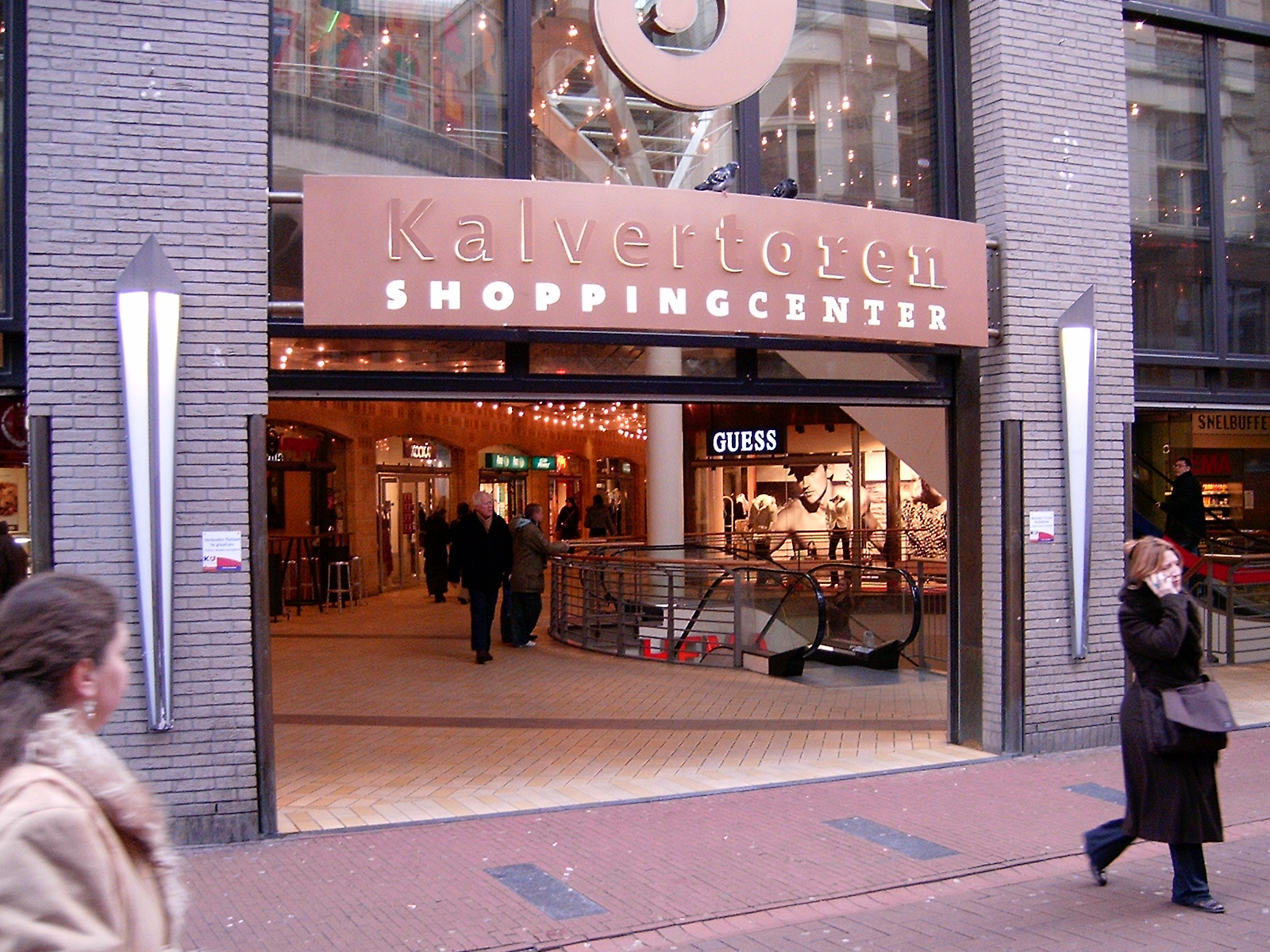
Kalvertoren shoppingcenter

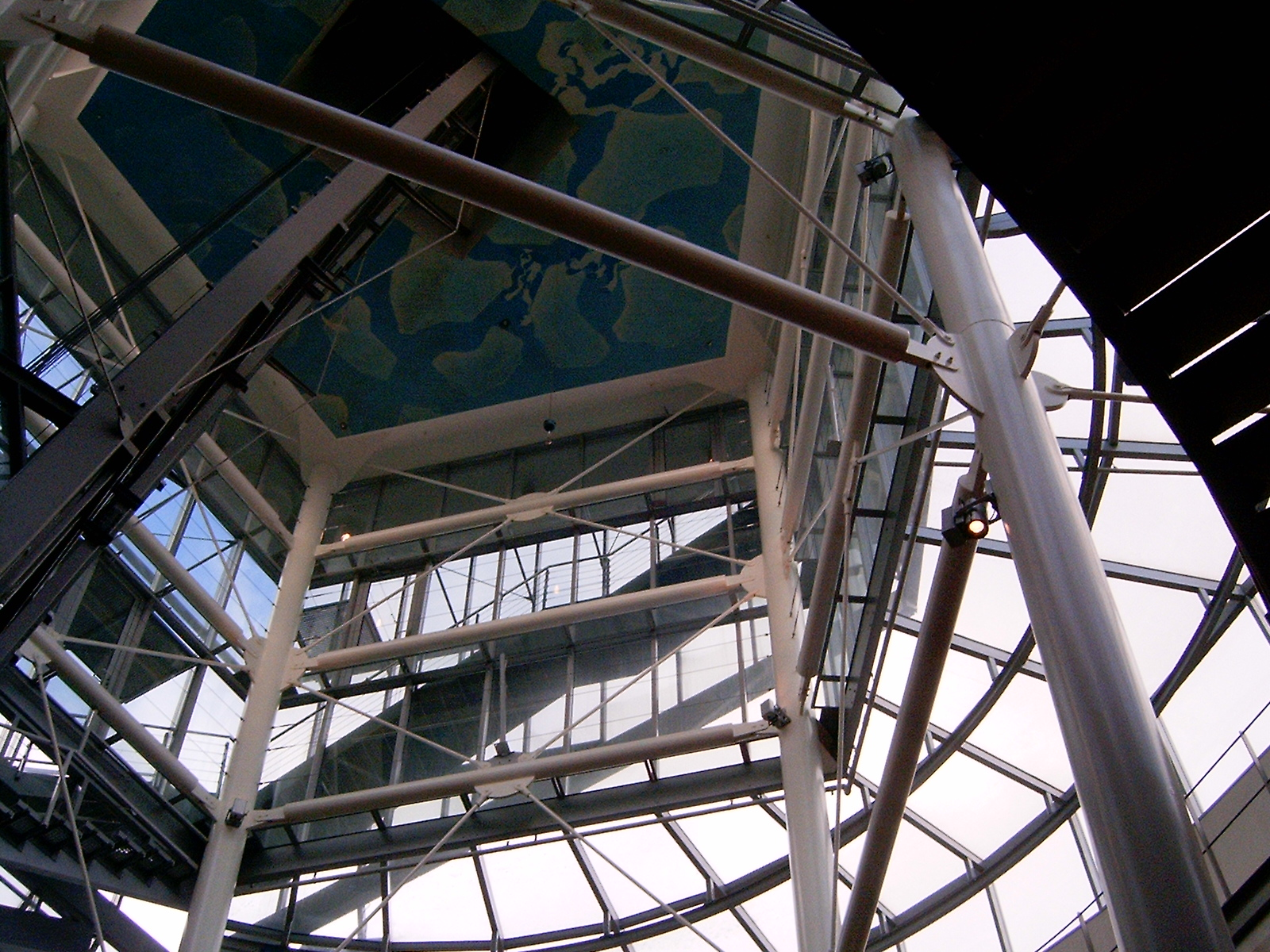
Kalvertoren stairs to the top level
