= English Reformed Church, Amsterdam =

Building in Amsterdam

Coordinates: 52°22′09″N 4°53′24″E

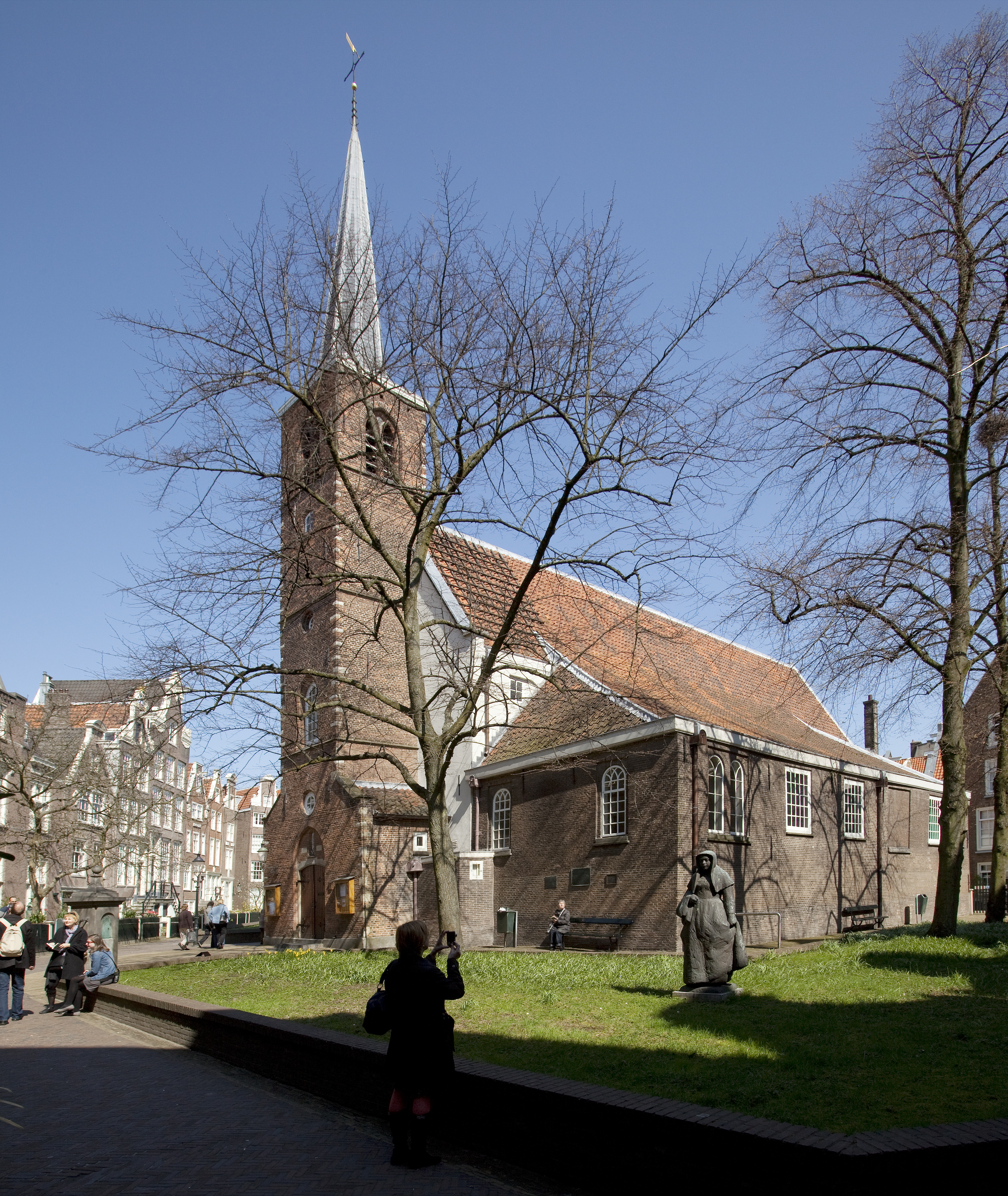
The English Reformed Church

The English Reformed Church is one of the oldest buildings in Amsterdam, situated in the Begijnhof, in the centre of the city. It is home to an English-speaking congregation which is affiliated to the Church of Scotland and to the Protestant Church in the Netherlands (formerly Dutch Reformed Church).

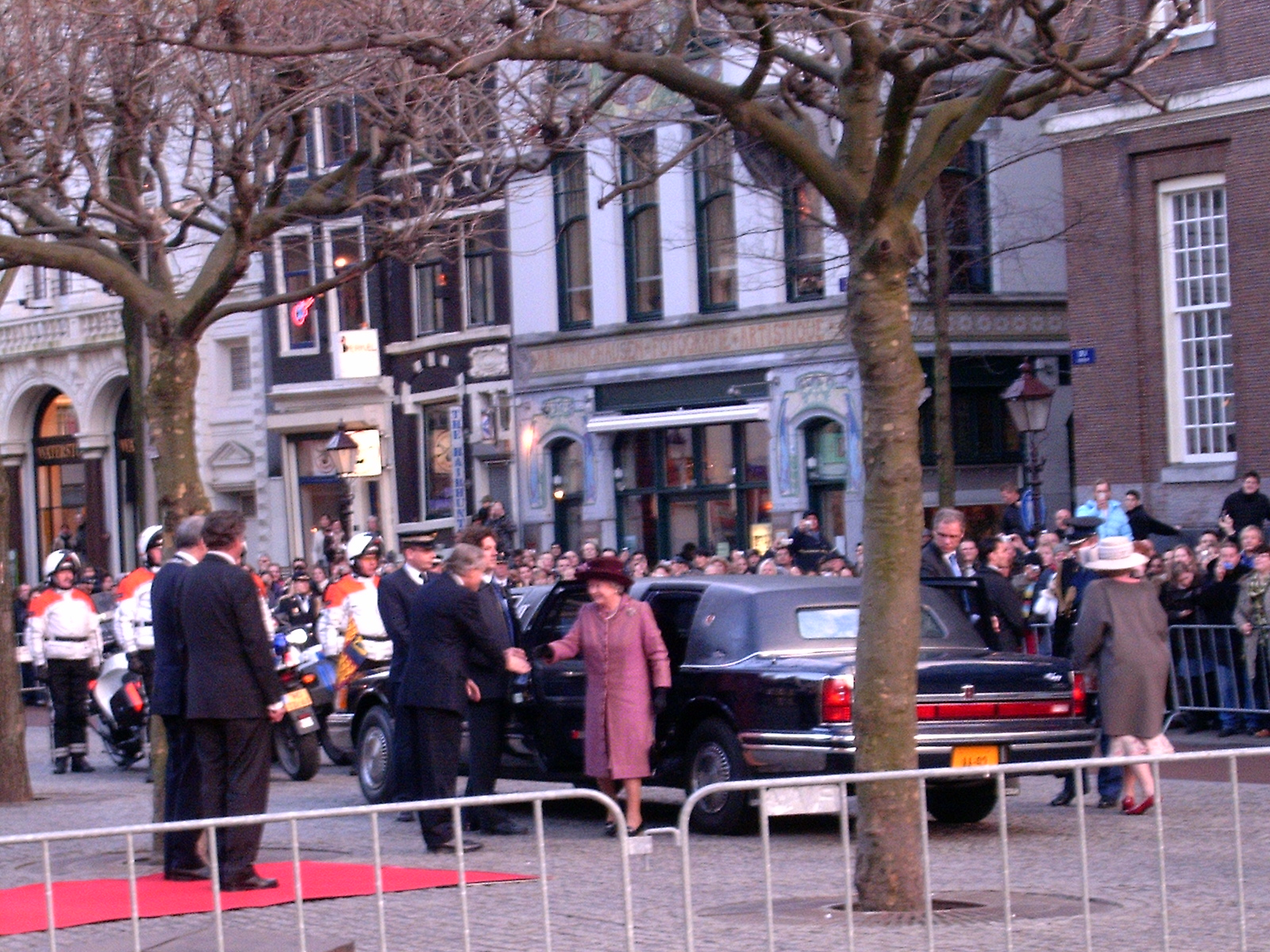
Visit of Queen Elizabeth II to the English Reformed Church

== See also ==
- List of Church of Scotland parishes
- Dutch Church, Austin Friars of London, England
