= Stille Omgang =

Dutch ritual procession

A painting with nine panels telling the story of the miracle.

A stille omgang ("Silent Walk" or circumambulation) is an informal ritual that serves as substitute for the Roman Catholic processions that were prohibited after the Reformation in the Netherlands in the 16th century until the abolition of the Dutch constitutional procession ban in 1983. Best known is the Stille Omgang of Amsterdam, which is however still performed every year in March.

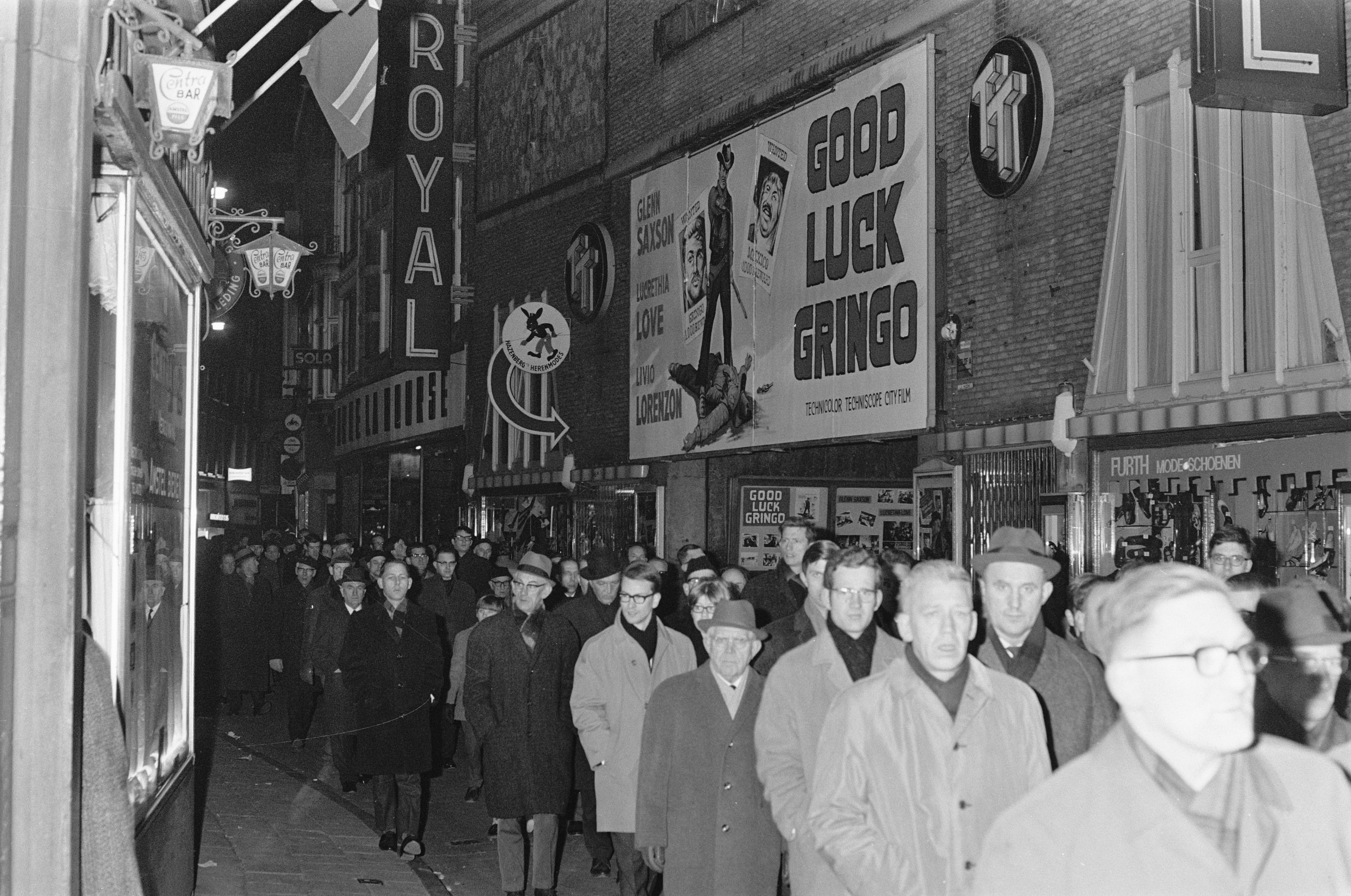
The Stille Omgang of 1969

This walk commemorates the Miracle of the Host of 16 March 1345, a Eucharistic miracle which involved a dying man vomiting upon being given the Holy Sacrament and last rites. The Host was then, due to liturgical regulations, put in the fire, but miraculously remained intact and could be retrieved from the ashes the following day. This miracle was quickly recognized by the municipality of Amsterdam and the bishop of Utrecht, and a large pilgrimage chapel, the Heilige Stede ("Holy Site") was built where the house had stood, and the Heiligeweg ("Holy Way") as the major pilgrimage route to it.

The Stille Omgang fell out of an individual practice since the 17th century, but was revived in a collective form in 1881, imitating in that way the medieval procession for the Miracle. During the 1950s up to 90.000 Catholics, from all over the Netherlands, walked the Silent Walk, in 2016 usually about 5,000 people took part in it, following Mass in one of Amsterdam's churches. However since the COVID-19 pandemic of 2019 and later, with the restart in 2023 the number of participants fell back to 2000. The Walk always occurs on the night of Saturday to Sunday following the start of the Mirakelfeest, which is on the first Wednesday after 12 March.

== Literature ==
Charles Caspers & Peter Jan Margry, The Amsterdam Miracle. Biography of a Contested Devotion (Notre Dame: University Press, 2019)
