= Thomas Paget (Puritan minister) =

- Born: c. 1587; Possibly Rothley
- Died: October 1660; Stockport
- Education: University of Cambridge
- Occupations: Anglican clergyman, later nonconformist teacher.
- Years active: 1611–1660
- Spouse: Margery Gouldsmith
- Children: Nathan Paget, Dorothy, Elizabeth, Thomas, John, Hanna
- Religion: Presbyterian
- Church: Church of England, Dutch Reformed Church
- Ordained: 6 June 1609 (deacon)
- Writings: Preface to A Defence Of Church-Government, Exercised in Presbyteriall, Classicall, & Synodall Assemblies (1641); A Demonstration of Family Duties (1643); A Religious Scrutiny (1649).
- Offices held: Curate and lecturer of Blackley Chapel, Manchester; Pastor at English Reformed Church, Amsterdam; Curate of Chad's, Shrewsbury; Rector of Stockport.

Thomas Paget (c. 1587 – October 1660) was an English Puritan clergyman, controversialist and theologian, committed to a Presbyterian church order. As a minister in Manchester, he was an early opponent of Laudian ceremonies in the Church of England. He served the English Reformed Church, Amsterdam, and later at Shrewsbury was a strong supporter of the regicide and of the republican Commonwealth of England. He spent his final year as rector of Stockport.

== Origins ==
Thomas Paget was the younger brother of the Puritan minister and writer John Paget. They are said to have belonged to the Paget family of Rothley, a village on the edge of Charnwood Forest in Leicestershire. Their parents are unknown and it is impossible to be sure that Rothley was their place of birth. Thomas was admitted to the University of Cambridge in 1605, suggesting a birth date around 1587.

== Education and ordination ==
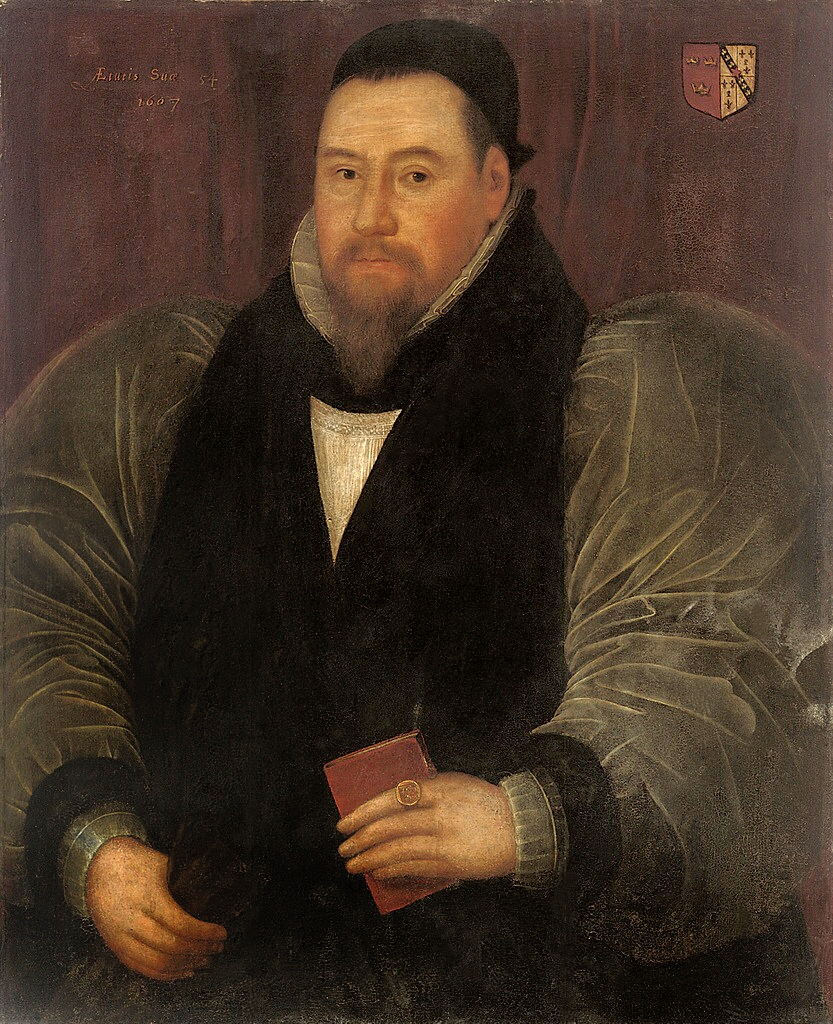
Martin Heton, Bishop of Ely.

Paget entered Trinity College, Cambridge, as a sizar, a student receiving some assistance with costs, at Easter 1605. He graduated B.A. early in 1609. A Thomas Paget B.A. of Trinity College was ordained deacon by the local ordinary, Martin Heton, on 6 June 1609 at Little Downham, a Cambridgeshire village where the Bishop of Ely had a palace: this seems to be him, although the Clergy of the Church of England database makes no link between this and his later career in Manchester. He proceeded to M.A. in 1612.

== Manchester ==
=== Appointment and ministry ===
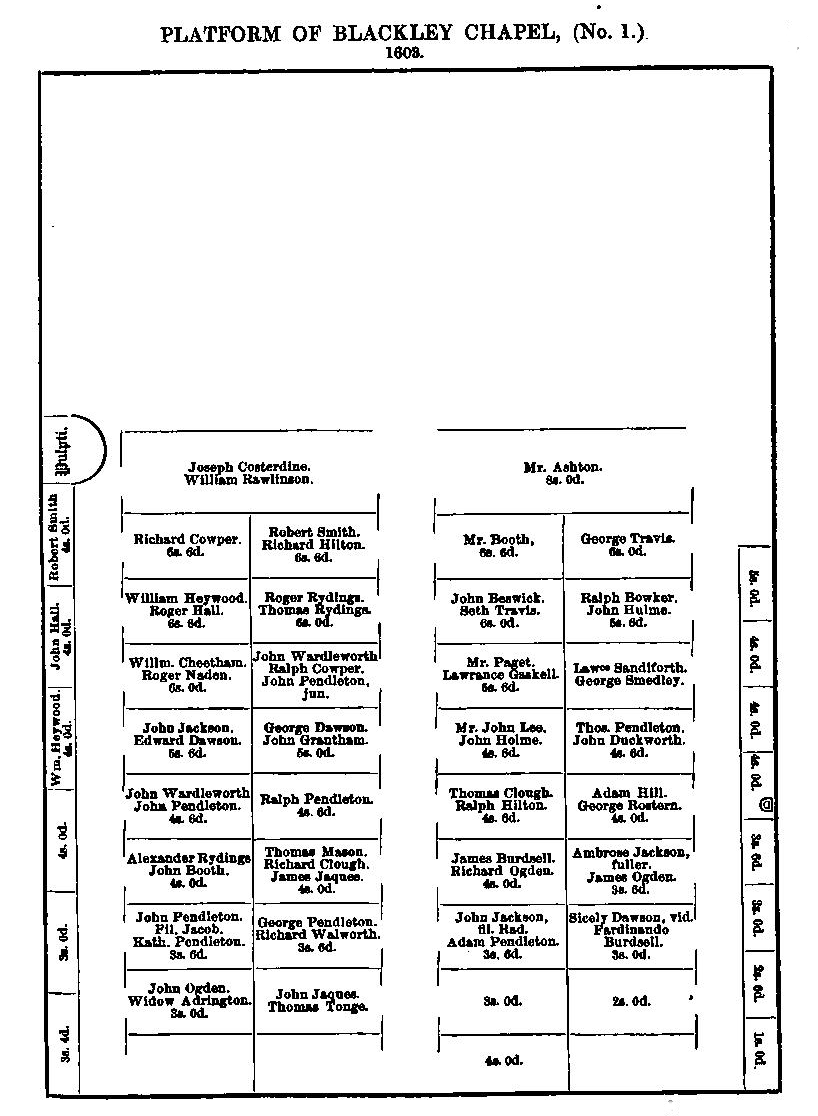
Booker's 1854 transcription of a c.1603 plan of the seating allocation in Blackley Chapel.

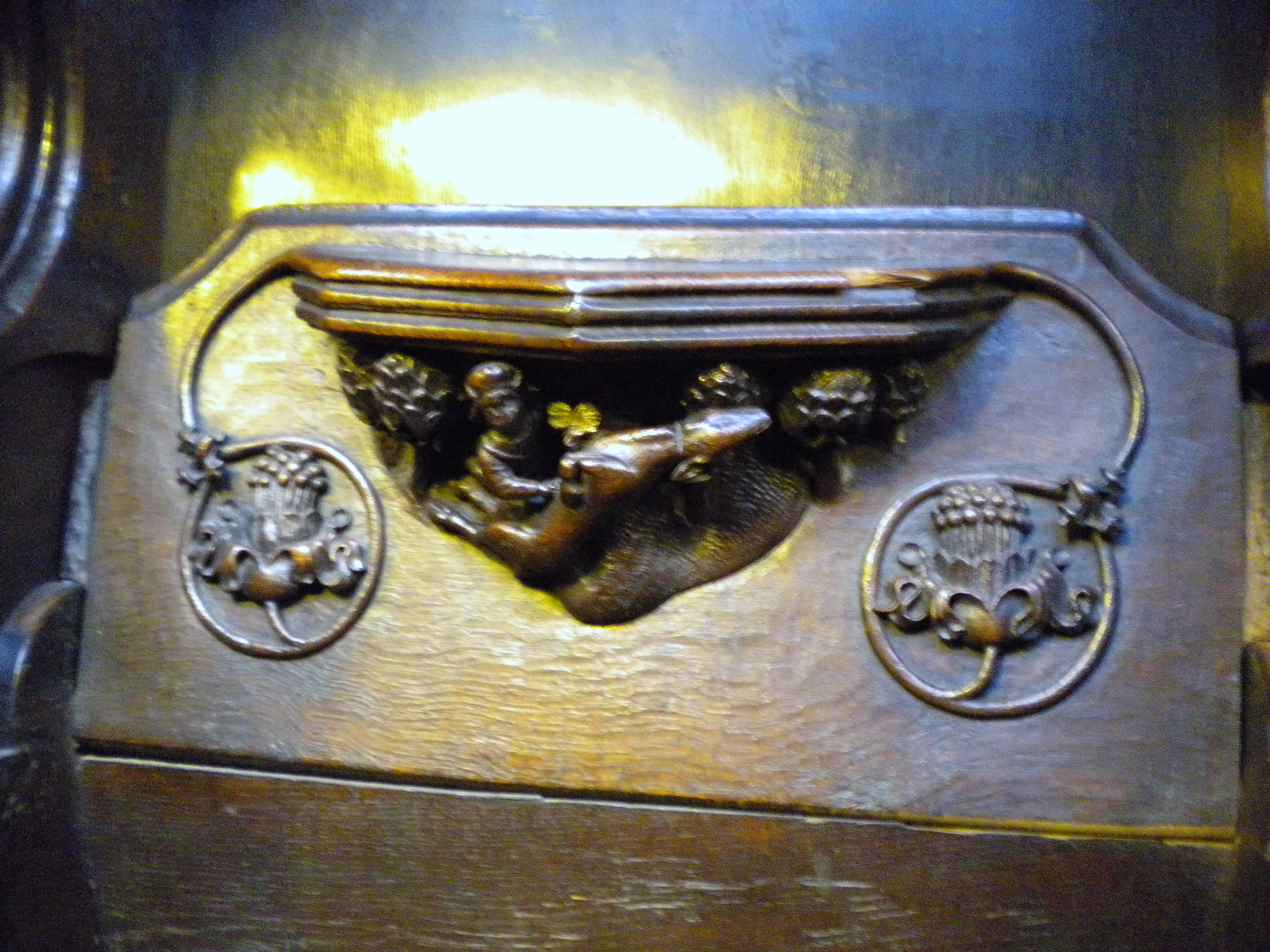
Misericord at Manchester Cathedral, originally the Collegiate Church, which had numerous chapels in the surrounding region.

Paget's first post was probably at Blackley chapel, which was part of the parish of St Mary's Church, Manchester. This had been a collegiate church in the late Middle Ages, established in 1421 at the instance of Thomas la Warr, 5th Baron De La Warr, who became its first warden, by Henry V and Pope Martin V. Blackley chapel already existed at this time, and had been licensed for use by Roger de la Warr, Thomas's father, in 1360. There were a number of chapels in the parish, generally established initially to provide for the needs of local landowners and their dependents: the Byron family, who held Blackley of the de la Warrs and lived locally, had applied for licences for chapels across their Lancashire estates from the early 15th century. The college was dissolved at the beginning of Edward VI's reign, along with almost all other colleges and chantries in England, but, unlike most of the others, was refounded by Mary I. Whatever its institutional character, St Mary's church continued to hold the advowson of Blackley chapel. Blackley became associated with radical Protestantism in this period. The Marian martyr John Bradford was probably a Blackley man He was certainly strongly influenced by Father Traves or Travis, the minister of Blackley in the mid-16th century.

Paget was described as curate of Blackley in the Liber cleri or canonical visitation report for 1620 and as lecturer two years later. However, he was appointed well before this, although clearly not as early as 1603, or even 1600, which some sources give, basing this on the earliest possible date attributable to a "platform" or plan of the chapel in which a Mr Paget is mentioned. Throughout the 16th century he chapel was probably regarded as the private oratory of the Byron family, who lived still locally. However, the Byrons moved away and began to sell off their property. On 16 May 1611 a group of interested parties, headed by Sir John Byron of Newstead Abbey, sold the chapel and its environs to three trustees, John Cudworth, James Chetham and Edmund Howarth, to provide a place of worship for local people. The deed provided that the purchasers and their heirs

shall and will at all times for ever hereafter permit and suffer all and every the inhabitants, tenants or farmers of any messuage, lands, tenements, or other hereditaments in Blakeley aforesaid, their heirs and assigns, and every of them which have agreed, purchas'd, or hereafter shall agree and purchase any messuages, lands, tenements or other hereditaments in Blakeley aforesaid to have and enjoy the said chappel, chappel yard, chamber, and garden, and all other premises with the appurtenances, as well for the saying and hearing Divine Service as for any other necessary and convenient purposes at the wills and pleasures of such inhabitants, tenants or farmers, their heirs and assigns as aforesaid...

The chapel was not the only property disposed of by the Byrons that day: a farm was sold for £70 to John Jackson, whose family name occurs on the chapel plan.

1611 coincides with the period when the recently graduated and ordained Paget would have been seeking a post, and he seems to have been the first settled minister after the chapel became a fully public place of worship. He was recruited by William Bourne, a fellow of St Mary's, Manchester, who was particularly interested in ensuring a good supply of ministers at the outlying chapels. A permanent post allowed Paget to marry. He had family and social connections at Nantwich, where his brother John had served as rector and married before being forced to emigrate to the Dutch Republic. Thomas married Margery Gouldsmith at St Mary's Church, Nantwich on 6 April 1613. The first child of the marriage, Nathan, was baptised at Manchester on 31 March 1615.

Paget's income was drawn from the pew rents and offerings of his congregation. The rent was due in quarterly instalments, as an episcopal confirmation of 1631 makes clear: the collection dates were Christmas (25 December), Annunciation (25 June), John the Baptist's Day (24 June) and Michaelmas (29 September). This was just after Paget left, as the clerk at the time was his successor, William Rathband. A plan, dated 1603, shows the layout and rentals of the pews, with the most expensive, nearest the front, being 8 shillings. One of the seats is assigned to Mr Paget, giving rise to the belief that Thomas Paget was minister at Blackley in 1603. The minister at that date was Oliver Carter, who served from 1598 until his death in March 1605, and Paget's university admission date makes it impossible that he was serving in Manchester in 1603: there is an unexplained discrepancy in the sources. The plan gives considerable insight into who were the key lay supporters of the Puritan preaching at Blackley, with the Travis family still featuring strongly. It seems that lay offerings and support were considerable, as the old building was completely renovated during Paget's incumbency. Sometimes Paget, like other ministers, benefited from bequests, as in 1624, when Judith Foxe left him 20 shillings in her will, as well as various sums for other ministers and more to be distributed by Bourne. Depending on this strong congregational base, the Presbyterian ministers also seem to have attempted a form of regional voluntary presbytery. Richard Hollinworth, a 17th-century Manchester Presbyterian minister, reports in his Mancuniensis that Bourne, with Paget and other ministers he approved, "often mett in a kind of consultatiue classis." They also took part together in preaching exercises, in which two or more sermons would be delivered at a particular chapel, with visiting preachers adding variety.

=== Conflict and flight ===
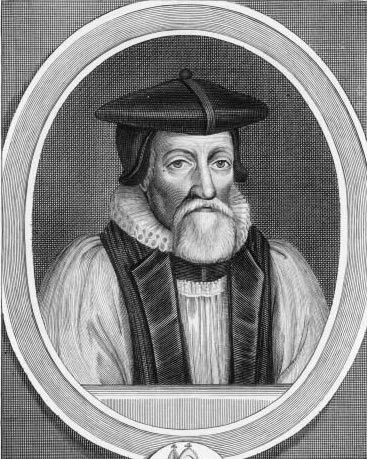
Thomas Morton, Bishop of Chester 1616-19

Serious conflict between Lancashire Puritans and the ecclesiastical authorities broke out in 1617, bringing into the open a number of disputes that had already simmered for some time. The issues came to a head after James I visited Hoghton Tower on 17 August 1617 during a royal progress through Lancashire. There he was presented with a petition prepared by local religious conservatives, requesting relaxation of the laws governing Sunday observance, asking they be allowed to pursue "lawful recreations and honest exercises" after the service: the Tudor dynasty had progressively restricted such pursuits. The king responded positively and ordered Thomas Morton, the Bishop of Chester, who was the preacher on the occasion, to prepare the Declaration of Sports, which was later applied to the whole country but was read out initially only in Lancashire. The document specifically excluded those who did not attend the Sunday service, meaning recusant Catholics, and those who attended churches outside their own parish, applying to Puritans, who frequently went to hear preaching in another parish after the service in their own. Paget seems to have been closely associated in the minds of contemporaries with resistance to the so-called Book of Sports, as a tale of miraculous conversion was told of him in that connection. The grandmother of Oliver Heywood, the nonconformist minister, had a husband who was considered "carnal" because he went shooting on Sunday afternoons. She went for advice and prayer to the Puritan minister of Ainsworth, to no avail. However, the man visited Bury for the fair. Finding the church open for lectures, he went in and heard Paget speak. He was converted and set himself on a new course.

Paget was among a number of the resisting Lancashire ministers cited before Bishop Morton for nonconformity. Morton started Court of High Commission proceedings against them. A group of Lancashire justices of the peace petitioned Morton on the ministers' behalf.

We have observed (soe farre as we are able to judge, in these our ministers, Integrity of life and conversation, orthodoxall soundnes of doctrine in their teaching, diligence and painfulness in their places; sobriety and peaceablenes in their dispositions free from factiousness. In regard whereof, and also the great good and profit which our Congregations where they remaine have abundantly received from their ministery, we are emboldened eftsoones to intreat &c.

Morton received the letter at Stockport rectory, to which Tobias Matthew, the Archbishop of York had appointed him alongside the bishopric. He observed in response: "They whom the letter concerneth are the worse to be liked for the good testimony the Gentlemen give of them." It seems from Paget's account that this took place in the presence of himself and other ministers who had been summoned before Morton. In old age, when he had himself become Rector of Stockport, Paget was visited by Henry Newcome and Richard Heyricke, the warden of St Mary's, Manchester and recalled

That Bishop Moreton, in that very room, (for he was, when Bishop of Chester, parson of Stockport,) did say to him and some others, about non-conformity, that they despised the Common Prayer; but it had converted more than all their preaching could do or ever would do, or to that purpose. Which expression we much wondered at, from so learned a man, and so great a divine as he was.

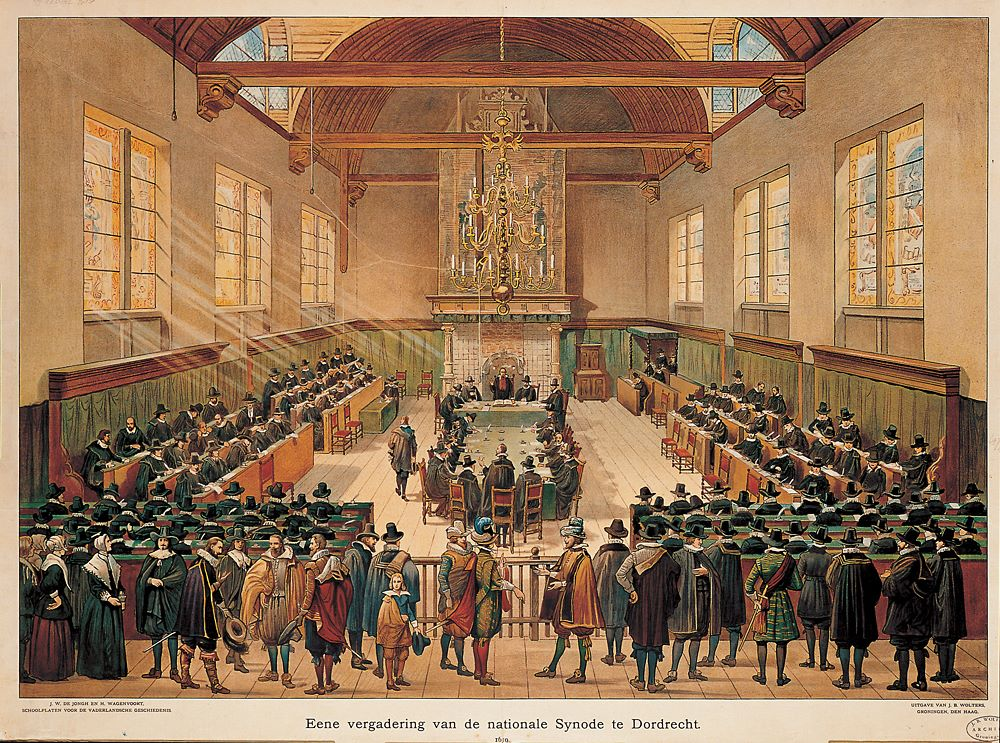
The Canons of Dort became a key definition of Calvinist orthodoxy.

Before the court, Paget and his fellow ministers were challenged by Morton to produce arguments against signing with the cross in baptism, a practice condemned by Puritans. Initially they refused, on the grounds that the demand was essentially for self-incrimination. Morton reassured them on this point and Paget spoke eloquently on behalf of the rest, to the surprise of Morton, who confessed he had not expected a learned response and reserved his own arguments for later. He ordered each of the accused ministers to commit three distinct arguments on the subject to paper and to present them to him within a month. Paget attended Morton three times at Chester over a two-week period, suffering the "blasphemous swearing and cursing" of the bishop's attendant and "two Popish Gentlemen" of an aristocrat's entourage. Paget never received a response directly from Morton. However, he was dismissed, after threats of suspension and even excommunication, with no more than a warning and a bill for court charges, towards which the bishop gave him ten shillings. Shortly afterwards, Morton published A Defence of the Innocencie of the Three Ceremonies of the Church of England, viz., the Surplice, Crosse after Baptisme, and Kneeling at the Receiving of the Blessed Sacrament. A gentle and eirenic work, it was apparently in part a response to the Lancashire Puritans. The king's positive response to the sternly Calvinist 1618 Synod of Dort stressed that the issues between the Church of England bishops and their Puritan ministers were at this stage largely confined to liturgical practice, rather than the deeper questions of soteriology and justification debated at the synod.

Prayer book of 1559, which included the Thirty-Nine Articles – a prescription for formal worship rejected by Puritans.

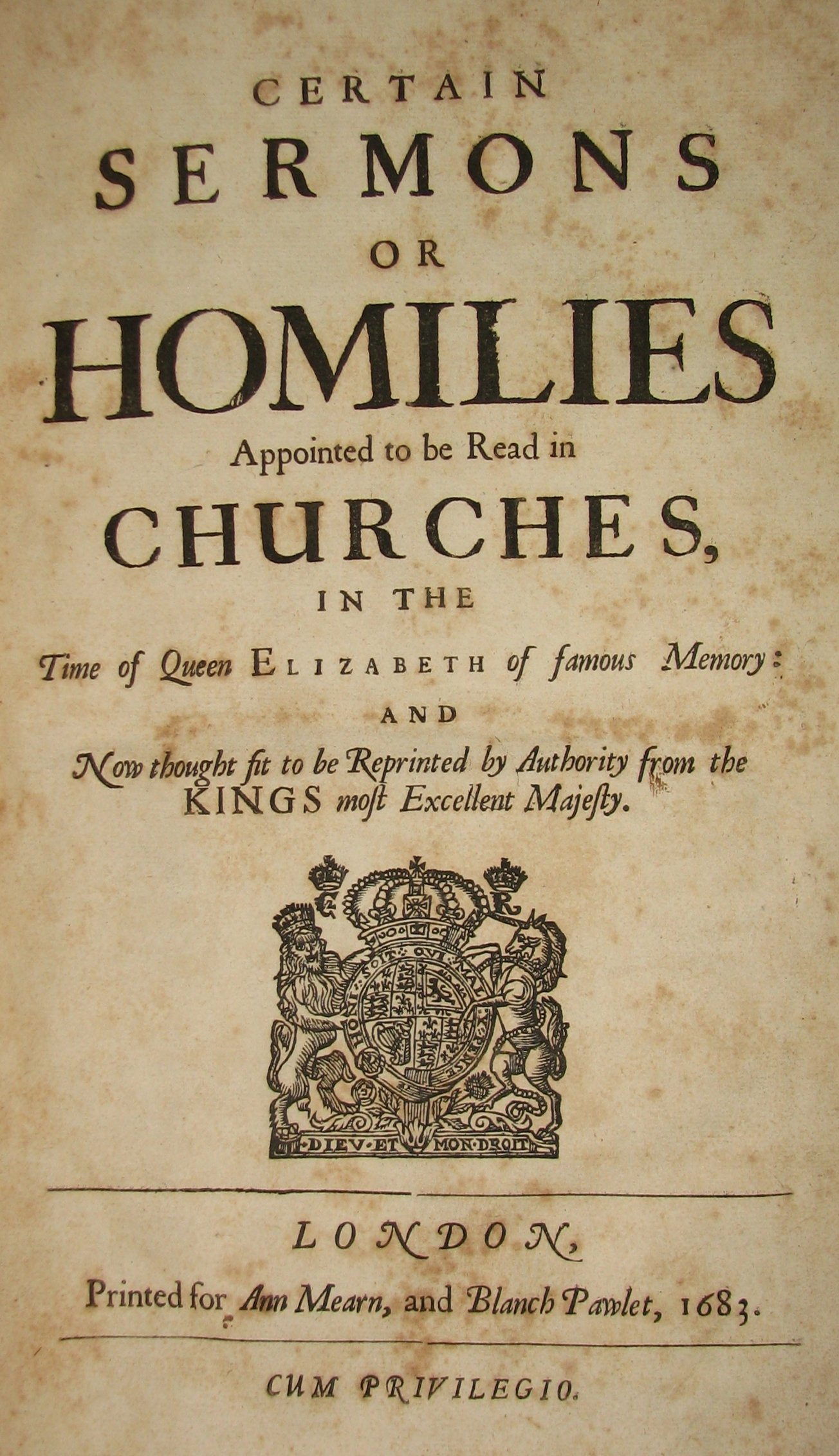
Title page of the 1683 reprinted edition of the Elizabethan Book of Homilies, another touchstone of conformity in the 17th century.

Morton asserted that his comparative leniency towards Puritans had cost him the large and wealthy Diocese of Lincoln but he was translated to Lichfield in 1619. He lost the lucrative Stockport rectory by cession. His successor at Chester, John Bridgeman was initially fairly lenient, although the churchwardens of Blackley were ordered in 1622 to provide copies of the Book of Homilies and the Thirty-Nine Articles and warned not to allow unlicensed preachers into the pulpit. However, conflict again built up, this time over kneeling for communion, another of the practices defended by Morton. On the basis of 1 Corinthians 14:40, "Let all things be done decently and in order," Morton argued that it was

By vertue of which permission, the Apostle doth grant a generall licence and authoritie to all churches, to ordaine any ceremonies that may bee fit for the better serving of God.

The Puritan view was that the practice was idolatrous, defying the Second Commandment, Exodus 20:4–6, and evoking the Catholic doctrines of transubstantiation and the Sacrifice of the Mass. Paget was summoned to a confrontation with Bridgeman. He took up a stance based on Matthew 15:9: "But in vain they do worship me, teaching for doctrines the commandments of men." Bridgeman illustrated the reclining posture he assumed to have been that of the disciples at the Last Supper and enquired whether Paget found that a decent and proper posture for communicants. With each unable even to understand each other's standpoint, it was inevitable that Paget would suffer and he was suspended from the ministry for two years. Henry Newcome included a story from this period in Paget's ministry in a collection of what he knew to be tall tales.

Old Mr. Rootes told me several the like. As, an apparitor at Blakeley, when old Mr. Paget was there, came in among the communicants and took all their names, and bragged that he would present them all at the visitation. The next Lord's day he resolved to go to Bolton to entrap Mr. Gosnall and his communicants in like manner. On the Sabbath morning when he was getting up, something, as he thought, gave him a dust on the neck; he fell immediately sick, and died within two hours. Some godly men came in when he was dead, as neighbours, and providentially saw the paper and burned it; and so the mischief by him was prevented.

Divine interventions or not, Paget was pursued by misfortune as well as the ecclesiastical authorities. In 1628 his wife died and was buried at Bowdon in Cheshire: this was one of the villages where Paget and other Puritan ministers held their monthly exercises and was close to Dunham Massey, the home of the leading Presbyterian layman in Cheshire George Booth. From 1625 the country had been ruled by Charles I's, who was perceived as an Arminian, opposed on a much deeper level to the Puritans, and closely supported by William Laud, whom he initially appointed Bishop of London. From 1629 the country was subjected to Thorough, an attempt at Absolute monarchy, with no Parliaments summoned for eleven years. In 1631 the Court of High Commission moved to serve Paget and other ministers with attachments for the various fines they had incurred, which increased at each hearing, and ordered they be imprisoned at York until they could offer securities. Paget and his family were forced to go into hiding. With still higher fines and costs mounting, they fled, taking refuge in the Dutch Republic, where his brother John was pastor of the English Reformed Church, Amsterdam.

== Amsterdam ==
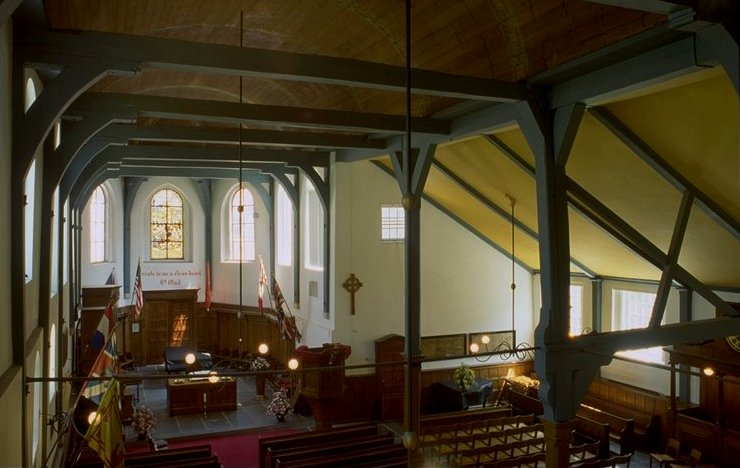
Interior of the English Reformed Church, Amsterdam.

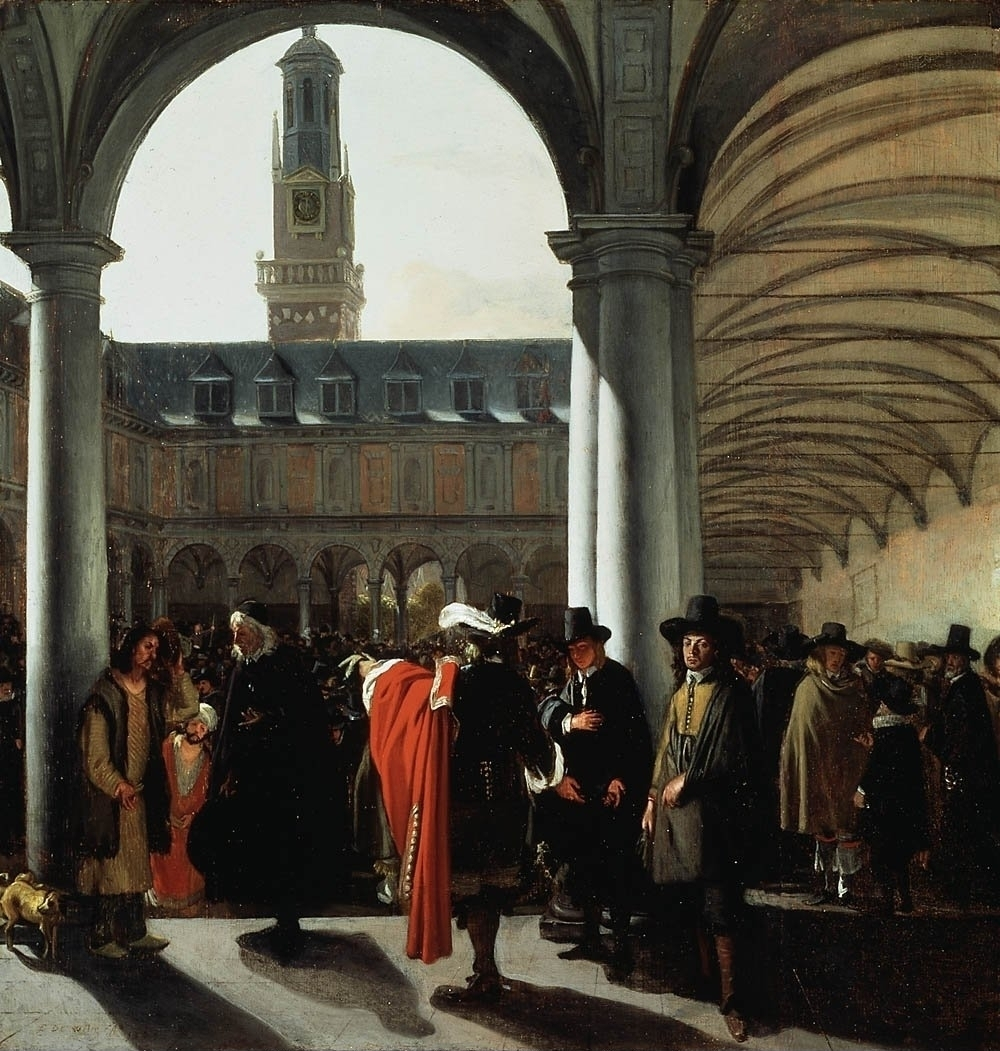
Courtyard of the Amsterdam Stock Exchange by Emanuel de Witte, 1653.

=== Exiled minister ===
Thomas Paget and his children took up residence in Amsterdam and lived among expatriate and exiled English-speaking Protestants. They looked on the surrounding Dutch community and the Presbyterians of Scotland as allies in the Calvinist cause. The eldest son, Nathan, was sent for his higher education first to the University of Edinburgh and later to Leiden University. John Paget was greatly involved in polemics against an emerging Independent or Congregationalist strain among the English Calvinists. Elements in his congregation proposed bringing in Thomas Hooker and John Davenport as assistant ministers to balance Paget's determined Presbyterianism. It is unclear exactly how Thomas made a living, but it is known that John Paget and his wife Briget were wealthy, with two houses in Amsterdam and shares in the state-sponsored Dutch West India Company, which made large profits from the Atlantic slave trade. Thomas was evidently well-enough provided for to remarry and a son, named Thomas, was born in 1635. Another minister in the Amsterdam church alongside the Pagets was the veteran Julines Herring, who had served at Shrewsbury, where he clashed with Bishop Morton, and at Wrenbury, where he was one of the Cheshire ministers persecuted by Bridgeman.

It seems that Thomas both assisted his brother and saw himself as his brother's spiritual heir. When John died sine prole in 1638 Thomas succeeded him as pastor. Briget, John's widow, moved to the Calvinist stronghold of Dordrecht to live with Robert Paget: he was John and Thomas's nephew, whom she and John had adopted as a son. There she acted as John's literary executor. In 1639 she published his Meditations of Death in, adding her own preface and dedicating it to Charles I's sister, Elizabeth Stuart, Queen of Bohemia, the Protestant heroine of the Thirty Years' War. The political relevance of drawing attention to Elizabeth and her friendship for exiled Puritans cannot have been lost. Charles I himself was trying to impose the Prayer Book on Scotland, initially it seemed with success, inflicting a major defeat on the Calvinists. However, the fierce reaction of the Covenanters and their victories in the Bishops' Wars forced the king to bring Thorough to an end and to seek support from Parliament.

=== Political intervention ===
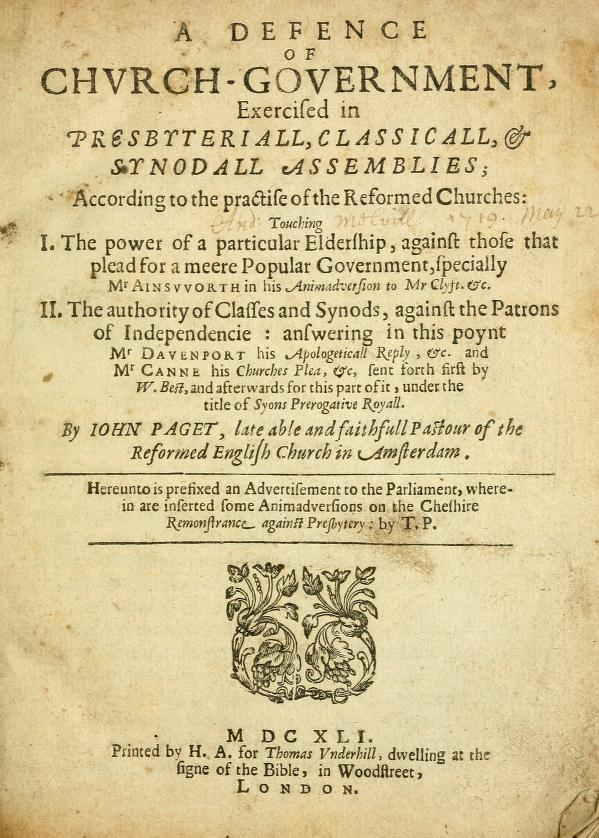
Cover of A Defence Of Church-Government.

In 1641 Thomas Paget made a significant intervention in the English political situation by arranging for the publication in London and presentation to the Long Parliament of his brother's book: A Defence Of Church-Government, Exercised in Presbyteriall, Classicall, & Synodall Assemblies. The intervention had a very specific context that made his own experience relevant. A petition from Cheshire had asked Parliament to do away with bishops, canon law, the Prayer Book, and the Thirty-Nine Articles. This was countered by another Cheshire petition, advocating continuation of episcopacy and denouncing all Puritans as "Schismatiques and Separatists." The conservative petition was published by Sir Thomas Aston, 1st Baronet with a dossier of supporting documents under the title A Remonstrance Against Presbytery.

Thomas Paget prefaced the book with his own "Humble Advertisment [sic]", intended to provide a context for it. Examination of the finished product immediately reveals Thomas's work to have been printed entirely separately from the rest of the book: it is unnumbered and is a much cruder and more rushed piece of typesetting. Moreover, the book already had a preface by Robert Paget, written in Dordrecht or Dort, under the heading "The Publisher to the Christian Reader." This suggests that it was one of Briget's editions, turned to an unintended purpose. The title page of the book explains that it advocates the "Authority of Classes and Synods, against the Patrons of Independencie: answering in this poynt Mr Davenport..." It was originally a response to John Paget's problems at the Amsterdam church in the previous decade.

Thomas Paget began with a reference to the profound change in circumstances.

It is the divine observation of Ecclesiastes the Sonne of David King in Ierufalem, To every thing there is a season: A time to keepe silence, and a time to speake. Truly it hath seemed to be a time to keepe silence in some by-gone yeeres in England, when the prudent Ministers of God were necessitated to keepe silence through the evill of the times, having beene made offenders for a word, as if their do&rine had beene conspiracy against the State, and the land not able to beare all their words.

Paget went on to outline the experiences of the Puritan clergy in the Diocese of Chester, focussing on his own confrontations with Morton and Bridgeman. This gave way to a detailed critique of Aston's book containing the Cheshire royalist petition. Paget was concerned to distinguish Presbyterianism carefully from Independency. This was one of the themes of a series of "Animadversions" that brought his preface to an end. Countering fears that Presbyterianism was incompatible with good order, he was able to point out that "The United Netherlands doe finde by experience that Presbytery is no way to conducible to Anarchie." However, he also criticized the framers of the earlier anti-episcopal petition for being equally confused as to the distinctions between different traditions of Puritanism.

Neither the Petition, nor Positions añexed to the Remonstrance doe seeke for Presbytery, but seeme rather to affect a popular government. The Patrons of popular government (contended for in the positions) are for the most part either Separatists, or Semi-separatists, who are as opposite to Presbyteriall government, as they are to Prelacy; as is well knowne to them that know them. And therfore it behooveth Cheshiremen to give righteous judgement, when they take upon them to censure, & in-no-wise confound & jumble together opiniõs & defenders of them soe directly opposite.

=== Further publishing ===
The changed political situation had already allowed Thomas's son Nathan Paget to return to England, where he was admitted to the College of Physicians in 1640. With the outbreak of the English Civil War in 1642, his career blossomed at Cambridge, inside the area controlled by Parliament. He signed the Solemn League and Covenant, as Parliament demanded in order to cement its alliance with the Scottish Covenanters. He also married Elizabeth Cromwell, the cousin of a minor Roundhead commander called Oliver Cromwell.

Thomas remained in Amsterdam throughout these difficult years, continuing to tend his flock, and writing for the now much wider market for English Puritan literature. In 1643 he published A Demonstration of Family Duties, a guide for Puritan parents that portrayed the family as a mutually sustaining community sharing a regulated common life:

because the members of the family do usually and for the most part share and partake more or less both in the welfare and in the miseries of one another mutually. And therefore they ought to use the means that God has sanctified and ordained for the mutual good and benefit of one another.

As family members were generally together in the morning and evening, these would be the best times for them to take part together in religious exercises. The very regularity of the daily round was important as it allowed the head of the family to embed the family in a wider social network, bringing in "some godly brethren and christian neighbours, for the more solemn performance of religious duties together."

== Shrewsbury ==
=== Appointment ===
Probably in 1645 Paget became aware of overtures from Shrewsbury. The town had fallen to the Parliamentarians as a result of a daring operation planned by Willem Reinking, a Dutch professional soldier, under the direction of its parliamentary committee, on 21 February. Royalist and Laudian clergy were purged from the town and the surrounding areas and replacements sought. Initially the centre of interest in Amsterdam was Julines Herring, who was probably invited back by Thomas Rowley, the merchant and former bailiff who had first introduced him to Shrewsbury around 1617. However, both Rowley and Herring were dead by the summer of 1645. Attention then turned to Paget: presumably Herring had recommended him. Some time in 1646 the congregation of St Chad's Church elected him as their minister, "for this was now become the mode of appointment," as Owen and Blakeway, both later Anglican clergymen in the town, remark in their 1825 History of Shrewsbury. The previous incumbent was one Lendall (forename unknown), who was perhaps appointed under the first royalist governor, Sir Francis Ottley. He seems to have been treated as a prisoner of war on the capture of the town and removed under an Act of 16 December 1642 ordering sequestration of the livings of those who joined the king's army.

Paget was definitely working at St Chad's by 4 November, when the parish register records the burial of "John, s. of Mr. Thomas Padgett, minister, of Chad's." It was not Paget's only loss in his early years at Chad's: a daughter, Hanna, was buried on 15 May 1648. The entries shows that the honorific "Saint" was no longer being used in the name of the church, in line with Puritan practice, which allowed it only for New Testament personages, or sometimes just for the Twelve Apostles.

Chad's was a demanding parish. It had been an important collegiate church in the Middle Ages, with a Dean and chapter and still had a very large parish, stretching out into the countryside south of Shrewsbury. The parish register shows that the birth, marriage and death rites involved considerable work, even in normal times. Between 21 and 28 March 1647, an entirely typical period, Paget must have conducted 11 baptisms, and 7 funerals and In April "It rayned in this month sutch store of raine, was sutch a flood as hath seldom bin the like." In December "23 of this month was a woman burned in the quorell for poysong her husband" – a disturbing event even in a time of war and violence. There were numerous drownings in the River Severn even in normal times. To add to the work, the neighbouring church of Julian had been provided with preachers only occasionally for many decades. Richard Lee, a minister who had made his name in the Puritan opposition at St Peter's Collegiate Church, was curate there for a time in 1642: forced out with the other Puritan clergy, he had since refocused his efforts in Wolverhampton. There had been no other regular incumbent since 1609 and the congregation generally relied on the minister of Chad's.

=== The Shropshire Presbyteries ===
Parliament had ordered that Presbyteries should be established in every county in June 1646. Shropshire had a complete system of six classes, based in Shrewsbury, Oswestry, Bridgnorth, Whitchurch, Ludlow and Chirbury. It was among only eight counties that got so far as to attempt implementation of a full Presbyterian polity. The scheme is recorded in a document entitled The Severall Divisions and Persons for Classicall Presbyteries in the County of Salop, issued over the signature of Edward Montagu, 2nd Earl of Manchester. "Cedds parish," the rendering used for Chad's, was allocated to the First Classis, along with the other Shrewsbury parishes and the surrounding rural parishes, and Paget was named as one of the eight ministers or teaching elders of the classis.

Paget was the oldest and most experienced of the classis ministers in the town: Barbara Coulton writes that "Paget was to be a magisterial figure in Shrewsbury." The incumbent of Alkmund's was Thomas Blake and Samuel Fisher was the pastor at Mary's: both were to become significant Puritan controversialists but were considerably younger than Paget. The lay elders were headed by the mayor of Shrewsbury and included Richard Pigot, the headmaster of Shrewsbury School, whom Paget must have known already, as Pigot was head of Northwich School when Nathan Paget was a student. The key figure among the elders was, however, Humphrey Mackworth of Betton Strange, the military governor of the town. Mackworth was one of Paget's parishioners and had a history of involvement in ecclesiastical politics stretching back to the 1620s, when he had opposed Peter Studley, the Laudian vicar of St Chad's and refused to kneel for communion.

Although the Shropshire scheme gave every appearance on paper of being well thought-out, it seems that for most of the county it never took real effect. Only the Fourth or Whitchurch Classis (also called the Bradford North Classis, after the hundred it occupied) became fully operational, ordaining 63 ministers over the twelve years of its existence. Shrewsbury under Mackworth soon began to follow a very different path and Paget seems to have been a close ally.

=== Division and conflict ===
1648 saw, signs of division appear in Shropshire. With the king implicated in the outbreak of a Second English Civil War and Presbyterianism tainted by the invasion of the Scottish Engagers, the Independents in the New Model Army began to put pressure on Parliament for a more radical turn. Seeing the threat, fifty-seven Shropshire ministers signed a denunciation of Independency, entitled A Testimony of the Ministers in the Province of Salop to the Truth of Jesus Christ and to the Solemn League and Covenant: as also against the Errors, Heresies and Blasphemies of these times and the Toleration of them. This was sent to the London province for the attention of Parliament. All of the other ministers of the Shrewsbury Classis signed it, except Paget. Presbyterianism had been Paget's fixed position for so long and so publicly that this must have come as a surprise. However, it was only the beginning.

1648 also saw Mackworth's vigilance save the town from a royalist insurgency instigated by John Byron, 1st Baron Byron, and, after Pride's Purge removed the moderate Presbyterian majority, leaving a Rump Parliament, he and his officers petitioned Parliament to bring the king to justice. He supported the regicide and the establishment of a republican regime, the Commonwealth of England. Paget had important family links to Oliver Cromwell, who increasingly set the pace politically, as well as apparently close relations with his chief parishioner. Using the pseudonym "Theophilus Philopatrus" he published a pamphlet entitled A Religious Scrutiny, justifying the regicide.

The Law and Minde of God, touching the capital punishment of the polluting and crying sin of wilful murder, whosoever is the committer of it, yea, though he be blood-guilty King, may not by a Magistrate looked upon as one to be dispensed withal.

He concluded with an allusion to Hosea 2:15: "The Valley of Achor is given for a door of hope." To a biblically literate Puritan, this evoked the example of Achar in Joshua 7:1–26, who was stoned to death after his defiance of God brought disfavour and disaster to the whole people. The implication seems to be that regicide was a cleansing act that restored the Covenant between God and England.

When Parliament prescribed a new oath of allegiance to the state for, among others, all ministers of religion, Paget found himself at odds with neighbouring ministers. In its 1650 form, the Oath of Engagement ran: "I do declare and promise, that I will be true and faithful to the Commonwealth of England, as it is now established, without a King or House of Lords." This plainly contradicted the Solemn League and Covenant, which had envisaged a Presbyterian national church headed by a sympathetic monarch. This was too much for both Blake and Fisher, who both used their pulpits to denounce the Engagement and refused to subscribe. Mackworth, on the other hand, all but denied his Presbyterian relative Sir Robert Harley permission to settle in Shrewsbury because he refused the Engagement. Paget re-published his earlier pamphlet on the regicide in a revised edition to support the new republican order. In it he expressed an entirely unsentimental and purely instrumental view of the Solemn League and Covenant, which had played such an important part in the lives of Presbyterians who, like Blake and Fisher, had lived through the Civil War. All such oaths, he maintained, were devised for "the just safety and preservation of the Common-wealth of England." However, he continued to advocate a Presbyterian polity as the best way of organizing the Church. For months the rival ministers of Shrewsbury continued to preach entirely opposed policies, evidently so fiercely that it was noted in London. Referring to correspondence received in March 1650, Bulstrode Whitelocke, Keeper of the Great Seal and a friend of Mackworth, wrote

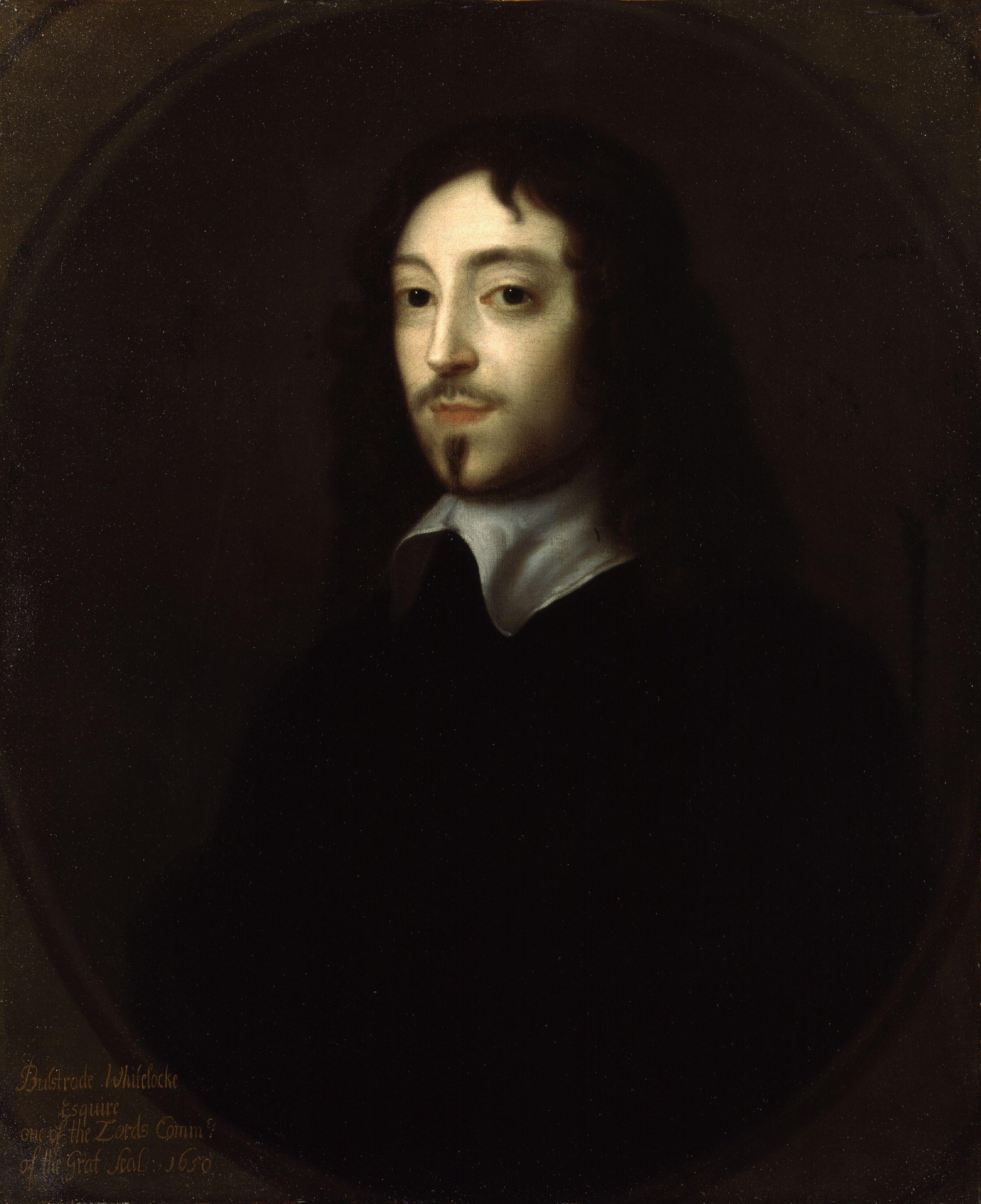
Bulstrode Whitelocke, 1650

From Shrewsbury, that the ministers preach much against the present government, and to encourage the people to sedition, and to rise for their king.
That at the day of the public fast kept in one of their churches, there was another mock fast kept in the other two churches by agreement of the ministers, and two sermons preached in them purposely to disturb the fast enjoined by authority.

This was alarmist, but genuinely alarming was Whitelocke's note in July: "Letters that the plague was broken out in Shrewsbury." Although news only reached London in July The outbreak of bubonic plague began a month earlier, as a marginal note in Chad's register makes clear.

The plaige begun in Shrowsbure the 12 of June 1650 in Frankwell, at John Conie's howse — Thomas Heayes Esqre., Maior of Shrowsbury.

This followed an entry recording the death of "John, s. of Richard Scrawley, a Irishman." Chad's parish register alone records 251 deaths, many of which took place in the pest-house. Owen and Blakeway's calculations show a peak in the summer months, with 76 in August, and a fairly rapid decline in the winter, tailing off to just two plague deaths in January 1651. Pressure from the government peaked exactly as the plague reached its most lethal stage. It was on 16 August that the Council of State wrote to Mackworth ordering him "to turn out of his garrison all such persons as, either in the pulpit or elsewhere, by seditious words endeavour to stir up sedition and uproar among the people." A week later the Council was more specific, naming Blake and Fisher, ordering Mackworth to detain them and to "examine them as to their former and late offences." The two dissident ministers were forced to leave the town late in the year. leaving Paget the sole serving minister in the centre of Shrewsbury for some time.

It seems that normal life was resumed fairly quickly, Whitelocke noting as early as December 1650 news "Of the ceasing of the plague in Shrewsbury, and thereupon that the markets were as full as ever." However, Shrewsbury faced another emergency in August 1651 as the Third English Civil War approached its final stage. The Scottish army of Charles II camped a few miles inside Shropshire at Tong, when, as Whitelocke noted, "the king sent a summons to colonel Mackworth, governor of Shrewsbury, inviting him to surrender that garrison to him; but the governor returned him a peremptory denial." There is no trace of an incumbent at Alkmund's before 29 August 1651, just after the king's army moved on, when the corporation agreed to add £5 towards the salary of Richard Heath, and it was not until January 1653 that Francis Tallents was installed at Mary's. Paget, Heath and Tallents were all appointed as ministers "assistant" to the Commissioners who were empowered by an ordinance of 22 August to eject "scandalous, ignorant, and insufficient or negligent ministers and schoolmasters." About six were actually ejected by the commissioners over the next two years.

=== Old age and new voices ===
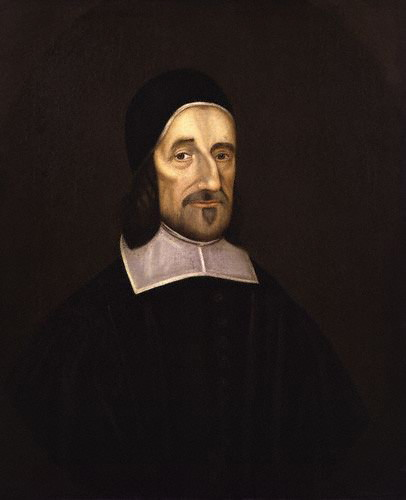
Richard Baxter.

Considerable changes in the balance of power now undermined Paget's local supremacy. Mackworth had spent much of 1654 in London as a member of the Protector's Council but died near the end of the year. The new governor, the younger Humphrey Mackworth, did not wield the same monopoly of power as his father. Under the Rule of the Major-Generals, Shropshire fell into the area governed by the Independent James Berry and he brought to the fore Thomas Hunt, a leading local Presbyterian. Hunt was on good terms with Richard Baxter and they explored ways of opening up the pulpits to fresh preachers. Baxter visited and encouraged John Bryan, who was having a hard time with a conservative congregation at Holy Cross, the former Shrewsbury Abbey, just to the east of the town. Hunt and Baxter also planned to bring Henry Newcome to Shrewsbury. The congregation of Julian's wanted to secure one of these fresh voices and began to spend considerable sums on improvements to the church, as well as making a direct approach to Newcome. Baxter wrote to Newcome, making clear that Paget's parish was the ultimate target.

Their desire is that you would take up with about £80 or £100 per annum for a while that you may be ready to succeed Mr. Paget (who is old and sickly), if God shall so order it, in the greatest congregation, where is a fuller maintenance.

Newcome's reply, dated 27 September 1656, made clear that he regarded Paget as a major obstacle to his acceptance in the town.

Mr. Paget is too well known to be a man of much frowardness, and he might create much unquietness if I should come thither to another church, with any intention of succeeding him. Which, when I was at Shrewsbury, was known to him; and, through the indiscretion of some honest men, every thing was so public, that I was much troubled how to carry when I was there.

On 31 October Baxter wrote to Newcome, acknowledging that Paget was a difficult man, although he was not sure he really resented Newcome:

I doubt not of the ministers' readiness to invite you, (except Mr. Paget, whom I have no mind to deal with about it, though, for aught I know, he also may consent.)

A month later Baxter was still pleading with Newcome, writing that "Mr. Bryan is in danger of being removed (as they tell me); and Mr. Paget is not long for this world." However, he had not found Paget quite so fearsome as he had supposed: "I hope Mr. Paget is not altogether so morose as some report him. I went to him after I writ to you last, and found him very fair and placable…" However, nothing came of the attempt to recruit Newcome as a minister to Shrewsbury.

== Stockport ==
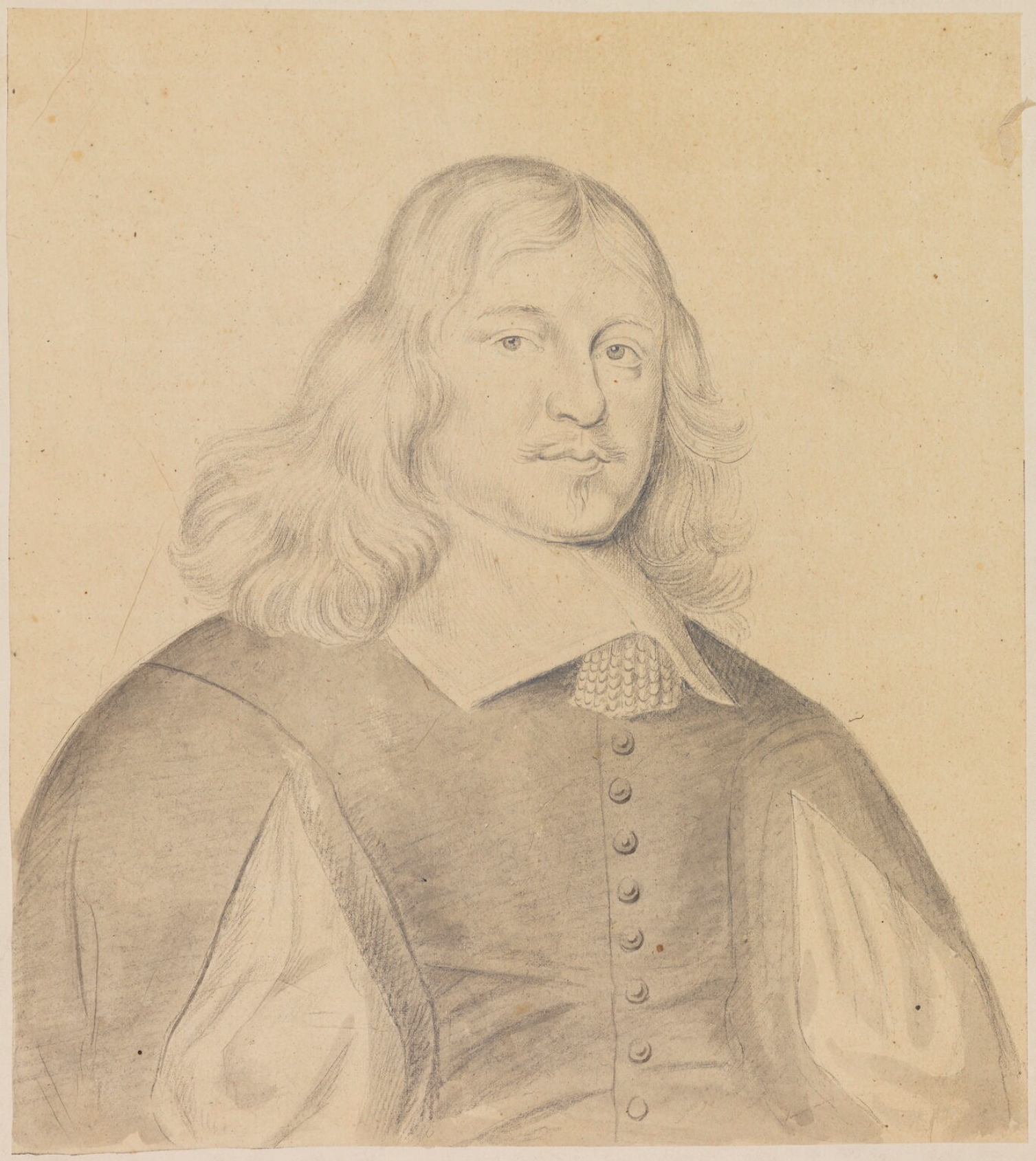
John Bradshaw, Paget's patron at Stockport.

Paget finally left Chad's for a well-paid and easier post. After the death of Oliver Cromwell on 3 September 1658, his son and successor, Richard Cromwell, reinstated as Chancellor of the Duchy of Lancaster the ardent republican John Bradshaw. One of the livings at Bradshaw's disposal was the rectory of Mary's Church, Stockport and he presented Paget to it. Paget automatically lost Chad's as soon as he accepted Stockport. A marginal note in Chad's parish register for 1658/9 relates that: "March 27, Mr. John Bryan was chossen minr. by the whole parish, being the next lord's day after that Mr. Paget had loste the place."

Newcome and Paget must have formed a fairly cordial relationship at this stage, as Newcome, a minister of the Collegiate Church in Manchester, visited Stockport to preach every Friday afternoon until the Great Ejection of 1662. Thus Newcome and Heyricke were able to visit Paget socially, sitting in the rectory at Stockport to hear the old man reminisce about the resistance to Bishop Morton, its former occupant. However Paget did not survive long in his new post. He lived to see the restoration of the monarchy but was spared the Ejection. It seems likely his deteriorating health forced him to resign some time before his death, as his successor, Henry Warren, was instituted on 21 September 1660.

== Death ==
Paget died in October 1660. His will, proved on 16 October, left his property to his sons, Nathan and Thomas, but mentions also three surviving daughters, Dorothy, Elizabeth and Mary. Paget nominated as supervisor of the will his "cousin" Thomas Minshull, an apothecary of Manchester who was actually a nephew of Margery Gouldsmith, his first wife.

== Marriages and family ==
Paget married twice.

Margery Gouldsmith or Goldsmith was from Nantwich and married Paget on 6 April 1613 and died in 1628. This marriage produced at least four known children, including

- Nathan Paget, a noted physician, who married Elizabeth Cromwell, and was a close friend of John Milton. He introduced Milton to his cousin Elizabeth Minshull, who later became the poet's third wife.
- Dorothy
- Elizabeth.

The name of Paget's second wife seems to be unknown. At least three children of the marriage are known.

- Thomas, a minister. He seems to have been born between 1635 and 1638 and became clerk of Shrewsbury School.
- John, who died in childhood at Shrewsbury in 1646.
- Hanna, who was buried at Shrewsbury in 1648.

== Mapping Thomas Paget's life ==
Map of England showing key locations in the life of Thomas Paget.
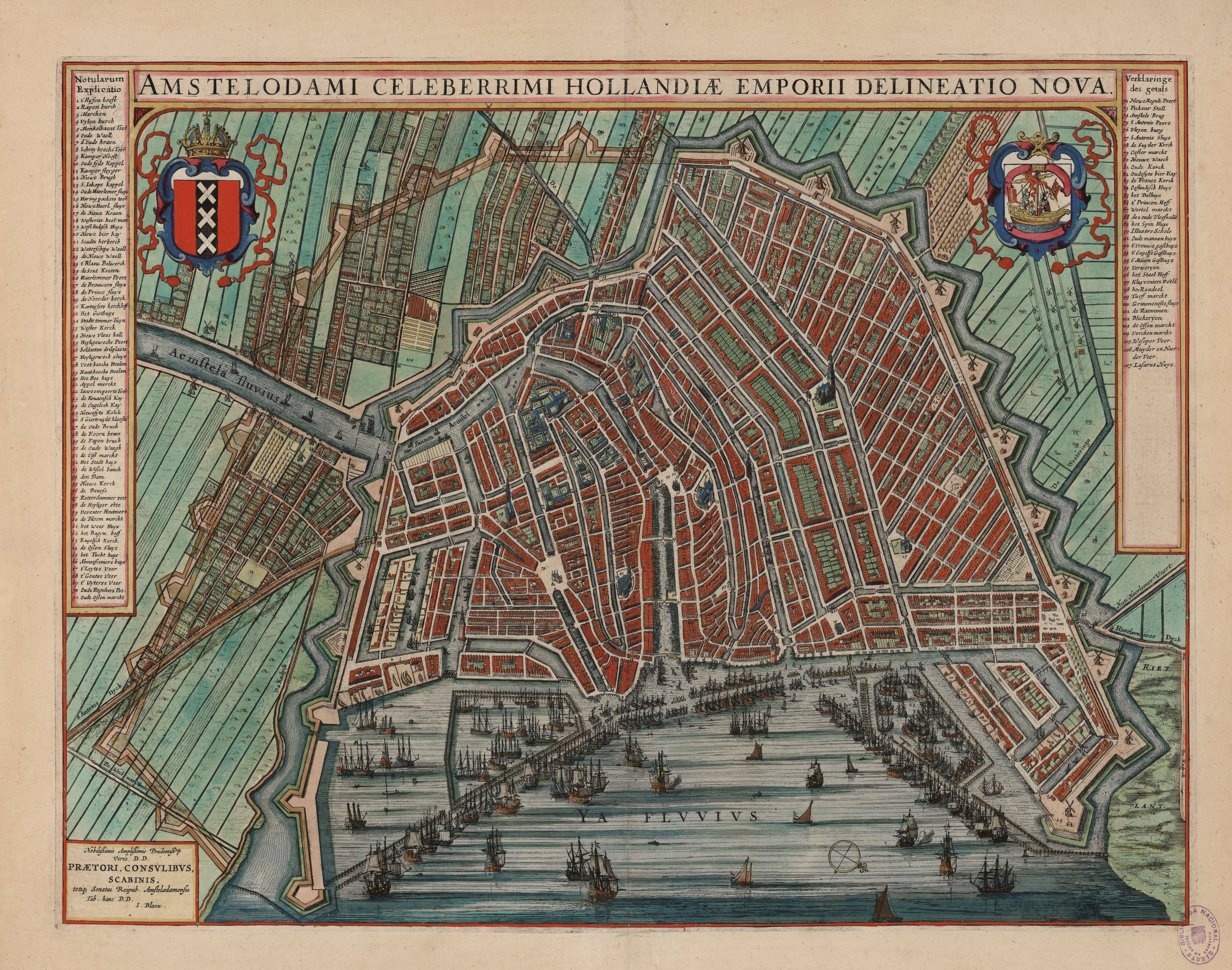
Position of English Reformed Church, marked on a map of Amsterdam, 1649. It is numbered 63 in the map's original legend.

Mapping Thomas Paget's life
Location	Dates	Event	Approximate coordinates
Rothley	Circa 1587	Likely birthplace.	52°42′31″N 1°08′09″W
Trinity College, Cambridge	1605-9	Higher education. Proceeded to MA 1612.	52°12′25″N 0°07′01″E
Little Downham	1609	Ordained deacon.	52°26′03″N 0°14′37″E
Blackley Chapel	1611/12-31	Minister and lecturer.	53°31′24″N 2°13′05″W
St Mary's Church, Nantwich	1613	Married Margery Gouldsmith.	53°04′01″N 2°31′14″W
English Reformed Church in the Begijnhof, Amsterdam	1631–46	Pastor, initially with brother, John Paget	52°22′10″N 4°53′25″E
Chad's Church, Shrewsbury	1646–59	Incumbent. Appointed minister of First Classis, Shropshire Province.	52°42′24″N 2°45′12″W
Mary's Church, Stockport	1659–60	Rector. Died October 1660.	53°24′40″N 2°09′18″W

Anglican Communion titles
Preceded by Oliver Carter	Minister of Blackley Chapel; 1611/12–31	Succeeded by William Rathband
Dutch Reformed Church titles
Preceded by John Paget	Pastor of the English Reformed Church, Amsterdam; 1631–46; With: John Paget (to 1638); Julines Herring (to 1645)	Succeeded by
Anglican Communion titles
Preceded by ? Lendall	Curate and Vicar of Chad's, Shrewsbury; 1646–59	Succeeded by John Bryan
Preceded by ? Johnson	Rector of Mary's Church, Stockport; 1659–60	Succeeded by Henry Warren
