= Francis Tallents =

English Presbyterian clergyman

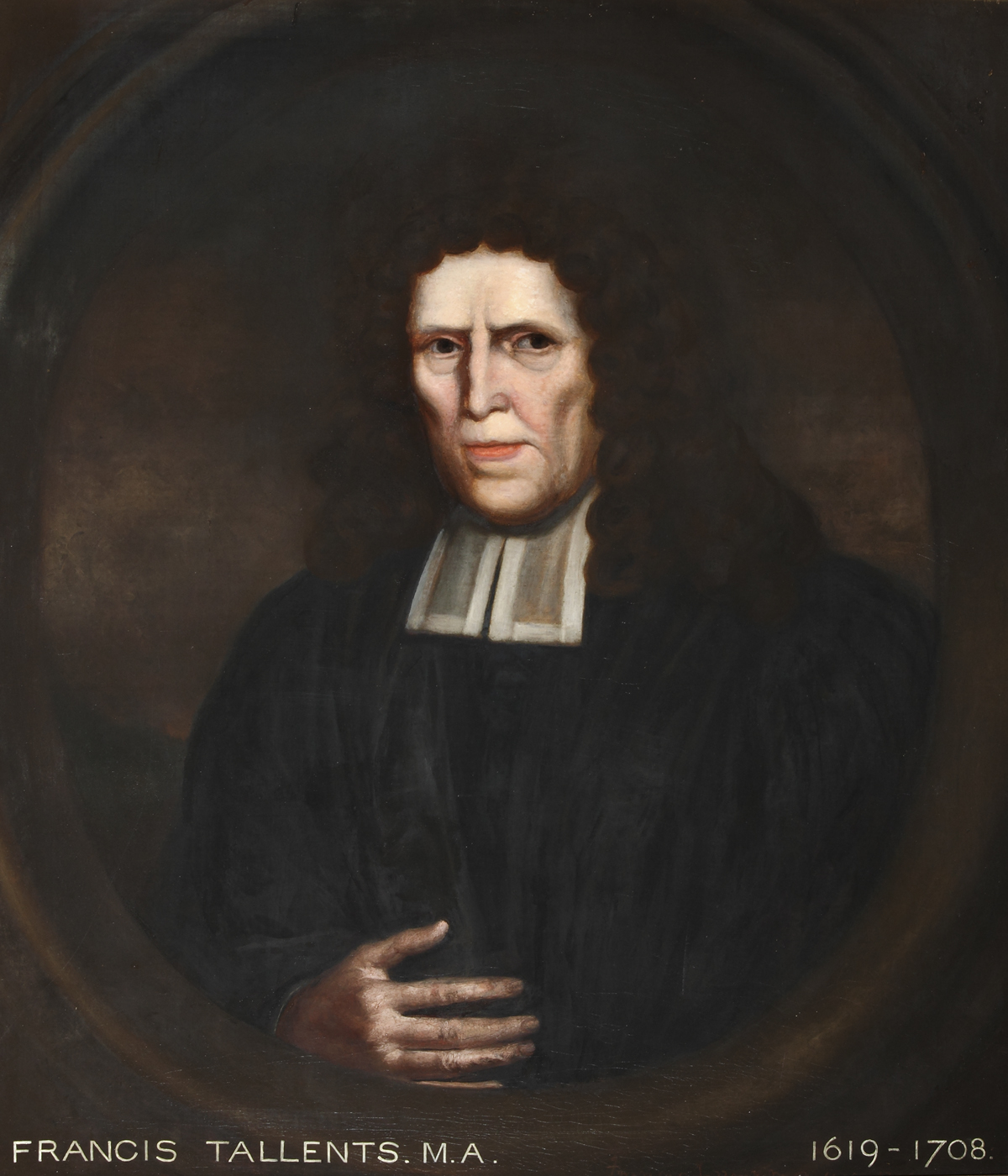

Francis Tallents (1619–1708) was a non-conforming English Presbyterian clergyman.

== Background, early life and education ==
Francis Tallents was of partly Huguenot ancestry. He was the eldest son of Philip Tallents, whose own father, a Frenchman, accompanied Francis Leke (MP), a Derbyshire Protestant politician and soldier, to England after saving his life.

Francis Tallents was born at Pilsley in the parish of North Wingfield, Derbyshire, in November 1619. His father dying when he was fourteen, Tallents was sent by an uncle, Francis Tallents, to the free schools at Mansfield and Newark.

== Academic life and ordination ==
Tallents studied at Peterhouse, Cambridge from 1635, and then moved to Magdalene College, Cambridge, to become sub-tutor to the sons of Theophilus Howard, 2nd Earl of Suffolk. He graduated B.A in 1641. In 1642 he travelled abroad with his pupils, and stayed for a time at Saumur, then an important centre of Huguenot teaching, where the Academy taught a moderate and inclusive Calvinism, known as Amyraldism. He later said that the encounter with Roman Catholicism at this point in his life reinforced his Protestant beliefs. This was the time of the English Civil War, in which such a commitment could dictate allegiance. He returned to Cambridge, a Parliamentarian stronghold and graduated M.A. in 1645, after which he was chosen Fellow and tutor of Magdalene.

For some years he continued in academic life, taking a strong interest in Science and History, as well as Theology. He knew at least some of the works of Jonas Moore, Pierre Gassendi and Johannes Kepler. Through Robert Boyle he knew about the activities and ideas of the Invisible College, a circle of natural philosophers who had a universalist and utopian outlook. He was also a talented teacher. Among his students was Robert Sawyer, a future Attorney General for England and Wales.

Tallents received ordination at St Mary's Woolnoth, London, on 29 November 1648 by the third London Presbyterian classis. In October 1649 he was appointed unus e predicatoribus ab Academia emittendis - one of the twelve graduates, chosen annually from the University, who, under an ordinance of Elizabeth I had power to preach without episcopal licence.

== Minister at Shrewsbury ==
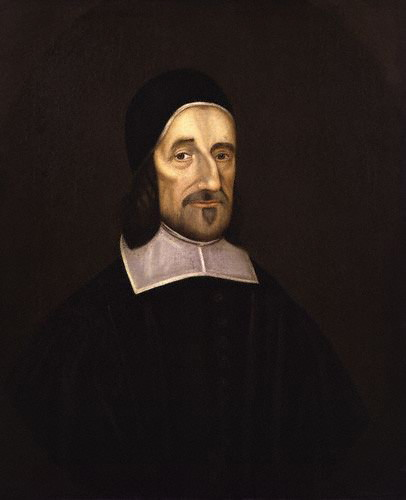
Richard Baxter, the noted Puritan preacher and theologian, who greatly valued Tallents.

In the summer of 1652 Tallents was invited by the mayor and aldermen, and urged by Richard Baxter, to become lecturer and curate at St Mary's, Shrewsbury. St Mary's had been a Collegiate church and Chapel Royal in the Middle Ages and remained a Royal Peculiar as before, although the council of Shrewsbury had assumed effective control. The precise reasons for the vacancy are slightly mysterious. The incumbent had been Samuel Fisher (died 1681), a Puritan preacher and controversialist of some note, but apparently not to the taste of some in the parish. In 1650 the Rump Parliament prescribed an Oath of Engagement, which was distasteful to many Presbyterians as they felt it contradicted the Solemn League and Covenant, to which they had subscribed at Parliament's behest in September 1643. Subsequently, Humphrey Mackworth, the governor of Shrewsbury, was instructed to expel from the town preachers who stirred up "sedition and uproar" among the people. Fisher and his mentor, Thomas Blake were among those who left, presumably refusing to take the Engagement. Both remained in Shropshire and continued to preach, leaving the situation unresolved. The next year brought the culmination of the Third English Civil War, when the Scottish army camped at Tong, Shropshire, held at bay by Mackworth, on its way to defeat at the Battle of Worcester. Consequently, it was not until 1652 that the situation stabilised sufficiently for the town council to be confident of making a replacement.

The initial choice was John Bryan, who was the most distinguished preacher in Coventry, but his churchwardens prevailed on him to stay, supported by Richard Baxter. The council then sought advice from Baxter, who recommended Tallents. Baxter greatly valued Tallents as a moderate Calvinist. In 1670 he described his friend as

Mr. Francis Talents, an ancient Fellow of Magdalen Colledge in Cambridge, and a good Schollar, a godly, blameless Divine, most eminent for extraordinary Prudence, and moderation, and peaceableness towards all, who in our Wars lived at Saumours in France and is now there again.

The mayor, recorder and four aldermen sent an express messenger to Cambridge on 29 June to present their invitation to Tallents. In July the parish sent him an address, pointing out that they had been without a minister for two years. In August a further invitation arrived, this time from the Elders and people. Baxter wrote to Tallents, commending the people and their church.

If my testimony can do any thing to turne the scales, I do assure you, impartially, that were I loose, I know not one congregacon in England that I would sooner choose. The People are (those that are godly) very serious, sober Christians, as most ever I knew! The Meeting Place very convenient for many to heare with an easy voice. Many godly ministers in the country about; and the place publique and of great resort and concernment. Sir, you know that the maine part of the comfort of a minister's life lyeth in the Piety, Stability, and Encouraging Obedience of his People.

Tallents had scruples about the position of Fisher, who wrote to the parish through Richard Pigot, the headmaster of Shrewsbury School, "not his willingness alone, but his earnest desire to have Mr. Tallents settle with them." This decided the matter and Tallents decided to accept. His formal nomination to the post of curate and lecturer was dated 4 January 1653. The Committee for Plundered Ministers added £50 to his income of £150 from the church. This was derived from the impropriate rectory of Oswestry, formerly held by Lord Craven, whose property had been sequestrated for delinquency.

As a minister, Tallents could be nonconformist even under the Commonwealth of England. In 1653 the Nominated Assembly decreed that all marriages should be solemnised before a Justice of the Peace. Tallents was opposed to this and decided to continue hearing the promises and pronouncing the couple married, reducing the JP to silence beside him until the time came to validate the ceremony. This was also the year he himself married for the first time: to Anne Lomax (born 1632), who was a niece of Samuel Hildersam, the minister at West Felton, member of the Westminster Assembly and son of Arthur Hildersam. They were married at West Felton on 9 June.

Tallents acted on a larger scale than his own church. An ordinance of 22 August 1654 set up county commissions for ejecting "scandalous, ignorant, and insufficient or negligent ministers and schoolmasters." For Shropshire 21 commissioners were appointed, with 20 "Ministers Assistant." Tallents was one of those appointed. There is no extant record of their proceedings but about six ministers are known to have been dealt with. Some were clearly unpopular with their people, for example, William Gower, a Scot who had been installed at Moreton Corbet after it was taken during the Civil War. The parish register asserts that he was a usurper installed by "Traytors and Rebells" but omits to mention that he was ejected by the Commonwealth too.

The preaching ministry involved controversy over basic principles of Christian belief. In 1652 a Shrewsbury preacher named Fidge had drawn complaints for seeming to teach antinomianism. Baxter was horrified but Tallents responded that it was "a company of bad conclusions drawn from good principles." In 1656 Tallents moderated a debate over infant baptism at Ellesmere, Shropshire This pitted Thomas Porter, the incumbent at Whitchurch, against a Mr Haggar, a Baptist, described by Calamy as an Anabaptist.

== Ejection ==
At the Restoration the commissioners appointed to restore deposed ministers were petitioned to allow him to remain, Fisher's predecessor, Nicholas Prowde, concurring. Support for his continuance was widespread, with various political factions competing to make him their figurehead. The leading faction on the council were the supporters of Thomas Jones, the town clerk and MP for Shrewsbury. Jones was a staunch Presbyterian, although he had remained in Shrewsbury while it was under Royalist rule, and even hosted Prince Rupert in his home. Together with the headmaster, Richard Pigot, and the mayor, Richard Bagot, he had a new deed of appointment drawn up for Tallents. On 10 October 1661 he received confirmation of his office. However, the Jones faction was strongly opposed by the Lord Lieutenant of Shropshire, Francis Lord Newport, and his Deputy Lieutenant, Richard Ottley, one of the MPs for Shropshire. The Corporation Act of December 1661 gave Newport and Ottley an opportunity to mount a coup against the dominant group in Shrewsbury, as it demanded office holders explicitly abjure the Solemn League and Covenant. Early in 1662 they moved against Jones and his supporters, placing council members under house arrest so that they could not fill vacancies as Presbyterians were purged from the council.

In March the Diocese of Lichfield and Coventry made a gift to the king consisting of money voluntarily subscribed by the clergy. Tallents contributed £2 10s. to the total of £88 16s. from his Archdeaconry – a display of loyalty that yielded no result.

The Act of Uniformity 1662 signalled the end of any chance of reconciliation between Presbyterians and the Church of England. It was passed by Parliament on 8 May and received Royal Assent on 19 May and was to become effective on 24 August, St Bartholomew's Day. However, Newport did not wait for the act to become effective, immediately turning out Presbyterian ministers of the Fourth Classis, the north-eastern area of Shropshire where he was dominant. he then turned his attention to Shrewsbury. Tallents was several times imprisoned in Shrewsbury Castle for preaching, along with John Bryan's son, also called John, and Pigot, the headmaster. On 1 September Newport arrived in Shrewsbury to enforce the Act of Uniformity definitively, accompanied by John Hacket, the Bishop of Lichfield and Coventry, and Sir Edward Littleton, a Staffordshire JP and MP. Ministers were expected to read Morning Prayer and Evening Prayer from the Book of Common Prayer, assent to the entire contents of the prayer book, forswear the Solemn League and Covenant and accept episcopal ordination if lacking. As Tallents refused to receive further ordination, he was ejected in September 1662.

== Ejected minister ==
After that time he regularly attended worship at St Mary's, only preaching himself at different hours, and thus he escaped molestation. From February 1671 to about 1674 he resided with his pupil, John Hampden the younger, near Paris. On his return he joined with the younger John Bryan (died 1699), in ministering to the presbyterian congregation at Oliver Chapel, High Street, Shrewsbury. An indictment was framed against him for holding a conventicle in December 1680, but he was able to prove an alibi, having spent the whole of the winter in France.

He was under suspicion after Monmouth's rebellion in 1685, and was lodged in Chester Castle, but was soon released, and on James II's progress to Shrewsbury in September 1687 he joined in the presentation to him of a purse of gold in recognition of the Declaration of Indulgence.

== Shrewsbury Academy ==
Shrewsbury Academy was a dissenting academy started in Shrewsbury by Tallents in about 1697, which passed to the control of James Owen in 1699. Owen died 1706 and his place was filled by Samuel Benion, M.D. The academy continued to about 1708.

== Death ==
He died at Shrewsbury on 11 April 1708, aged nearly eighty-nine, and was buried on 15 April in St Mary's Church. He composed his own epitaph.

== Works ==
His 1705 History of Schism involved him in controversy with the nonjuring clergyman Samuel Grascome (1641–1708).

Besides a sermon preached at the funeral of Philip Henry, republished in ‘Eighteen Sermons,’ London, 1816, Tallents published:

- ‘A View of Universal History,’ London, 1685, a series of chronological tables which he had engraved on sixteen copper-plates in his own house.
- ‘A Sure and Large Foundation,’ 1689?; a copy of this was given by him to the school library at Shrewsbury, in 1696, but the work is not otherwise known; and
- ‘A Short History of Schism,’ London, 1705. This was answered by ‘S. G.,’ i.e. Samuel Grascome, in ‘Moderation in Fashion, or an Answer to a Treatise,’ &c., 1705. Tallents followed with ‘Some few Considerations upon S. G.'s Large Answer to the Short History,’ &c., London, 1706, and Grascome rejoined in ‘Schism triumphant, or a Rejoinder to a Reply,’ &c., London, 1707.

A manuscript journal of Tallents's travels was in the possession of Job Orton, and then was owned by the Rev. John Brickdale Blakeway in 1825, who used it in compiling the History of Shrewsbury.

== Family ==
Tallents was four times married:

1. in 1654 to Anne (died 1658), daughter of Gervase Lomax;
2. in 1661 to Martha (died 1663), daughter of Thomas Clive of Walford, near Baschurch, Shropshire;
3. in 1673, when she was aged 40, to Mrs. Mary Greenhill (died 1685), widow of William Greenhill, of Harrow-on-the-Hill, Middlesex.
4. in 1688 to his fourth wife Elizabeth, who was buried at St Mary's on 11 March 1702.

By his first wife only had he issue—a son, Hildersham, who only lived two weeks in 1655, and another son Francis, born on 7 September 1656, admitted to Magdalene College, Cambridge, in 1672, graduated thence B.A. 1675, M.A. 1679. He became chaplain to Sir D. Gauden, the sheriff of London, was acquainted with Samuel Pepys, and died in early life.

Francis Hutchinson was the son of his sister Mary. Tallents directed his historical studies, and employed him (about 1680) in taking the manuscript of his View of Universal History to Edward Stillingfleet, William Beveridge, and Richard Kidder, for their corrections before it was printed.

== Works ==
- Universal History, 1685
- A Sure and Large Foundation
- A History of Schism, 1705
- Some few considerations upon Mr S G's large answer to the Short history of schism; and especially upon the new and bold assertion, that there can be no church, or salvation, ... without a canonical bishop, 1706
