= St Alban, Wood Street =

Former church in London

Coordinates: 51°30′59.69″N 0°5′38.95″W

St. Alban, Wood Street
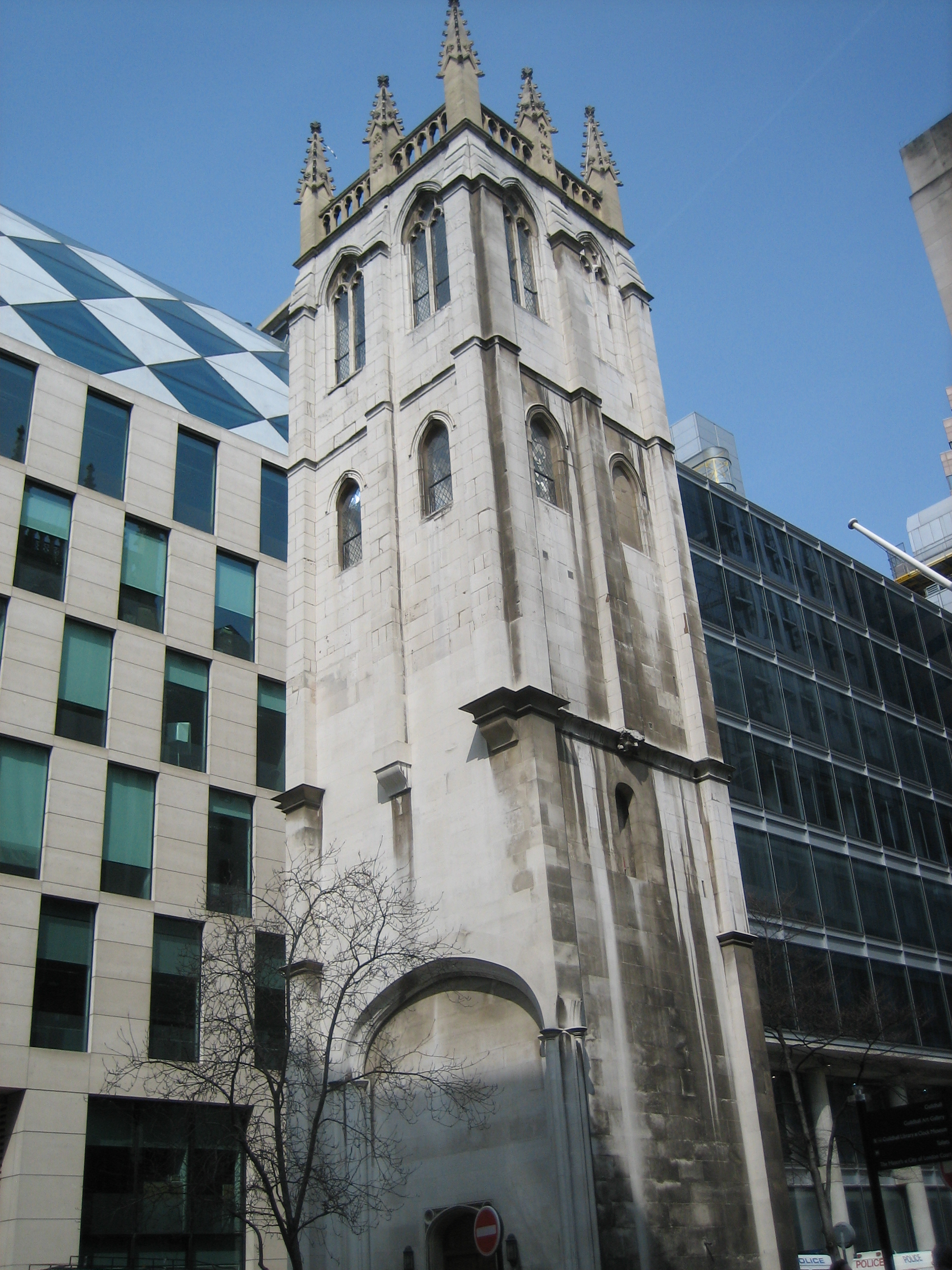
- The tower of St. Alban's
- St. Alban, Wood Street
- Location: Wood Street, London
- Country: England
- Denomination: Anglican

St Alban's was a church in Wood Street, City of London. It was dedicated to Saint Alban. Of medieval origin, it was rebuilt in 1634, destroyed in the Great Fire of London in 1666, and rebuilt, this time to a Gothic design by Sir Christopher Wren. It was severely damaged by bombing during the Second World War and the ruins cleared, leaving only the tower.

== History ==
Some argue that it dated back to King Offa of Mercia, who is believed to have had a palace on the site which included a chapel. Offa founded an abbey also dedicated to Alban in 793 and subsequently a number of churches were dedicated to St Alban in the City of London. The accounts of the parish clerk date back to 930. In 1077 the abbot of St Albans exchanged the right of presentation of the cleric for this church for the patronage of another church belonging to the abbot of Westminster. At the time of King John the church was known as St Alban Wuderstrate.

In 1633 Inigo Jones and Sir Henry Spiller, among others, were requested to examine the church, which had fallen into disrepair, and report on its condition. It was found to be beyond repair and was demolished and rebuilt in 1634.

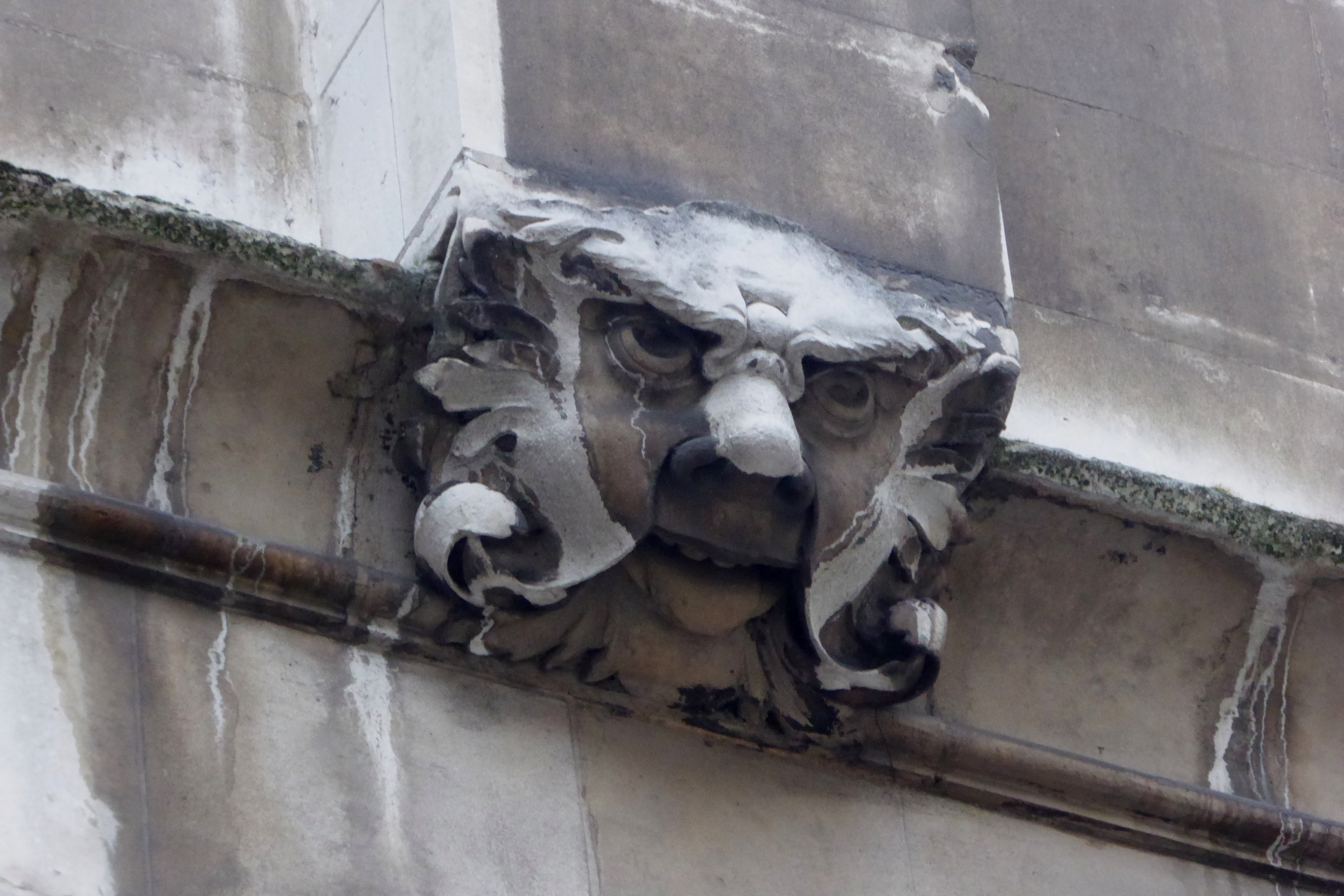
A grotesque on the southern side of the tower

The church was completely destroyed in the Great Fire of London. It was rebuilt by Sir Christopher Wren in a late Perpendicular Gothic style, and completed in 1685. The rebuilt church was divided into nave and aisles by piers shaped as clustered columns, supporting unusually flattened pointed arches. The nave had plaster lierne vaults. After the fire the parish was combined with that of St Olave's, Silver Street, which was not rebuilt.

The church was restored in 1858–9 by George Gilbert Scott, who added an apse.

The 92-foot high tower, which stood on the north side of the church, had four pinnacles which were replaced in 1879.

The building was burnt out and partially destroyed during the Blitz in 1940. The parish was united with that of St Vedast Foster Lane in 1954 and the remains of the body of the church demolished in 1965. The tower was left standing and today remains as a private dwelling on a traffic island. The tower was designated a Grade II* listed building on 4 January 1950.

Its exterior was used as headquarters of the group AD1 in the 2009 film St Trinian's II: The Legend of Fritton's Gold, and as a location in the music video for Adam Rickitt's Everything My Heart Desires.

=== Parish records ===
The parish records are held at the Guildhall Library. Receipts for burial with names of deceased can be found in the churchwardens' accounts 1584–1636.

== See also ==
- List of Christopher Wren churches in London
- List of churches rebuilt after the Great Fire but since demolished
