= Thorough =

In 17th century England, Thorough was a name given by Thomas Wentworth, 1st Earl of Strafford to a scheme of his to establish absolute monarchy in England. Although "Thorough" is largely attributed to Strafford, its implementation can also be accredited to the Archbishop of Canterbury William Laud.

== Under Laud ==
Laud exploited his secular and religious roles to implement the policy of Thorough in England. Laud used his authority as Archbishop of Canterbury to appoint only Arminian clergymen as bishops; this in turn meant that most vicars they appointed would also be Arminian. Arminianism is a sect of Protestant Christianity which believes in the "Divine Right of Kings" and the (Catholic reminiscent) "Beauty of Holiness". Laud hoped that his new Arminian Church of England would make the English conform to believing in the "Divine Right", supporting Charles I's personal rule and setting up a parliament-independent monarchy.

Though English Arminians often supported expansion of royal authority, this did not correlate to support of absolutist monarchies. Arminians challenged Calvinist conception of absolute predestination by introducing an element of free will into Protestant soteriology; that is, they asserted that even the elect (those destined to salvation) could fall totally and finally from saving grace. This idea often translated into acceptance of an increased role of sacraments and the ecclesiastical hierarchy, or the "Beauty of Holiness", though this was not necessarily the case. The phrase "Divine Right of Kings" has been incorrectly interpreted as equivalent to absolutism.

Laud used his authority over the prerogative courts to humiliate the gentry, who were largely Puritan and Presbyterian. As Puritans and Presbyterians, the gentry were opposed to Laud's beliefs and opposed to the idea of a parliament-independent monarchy. William Laud used his authority over the prerogative courts to punish many people, including Puritan martyr William Prynne. In this era, religious issues were constitutional issues as in the case of Charles I and William Laud's attempt to impose the English Book of Common Prayer on Scotland.

== Under Strafford ==
Strafford was Lord Deputy of Ireland, and domiciled in Ireland for much of the personal rule. He left the running of England largely to Laud, although the application of Thorough in Ireland was entirely down to Strafford. The fear that Strafford instilled in the Irish through the policy of "Thorough" can be demonstrated when looking at the ease with which Strafford extracted subsidies from the Irish Parliament as the Second Bishops War approached during 1640. As well as attempting to raise revenue, Strafford aimed to assert the authority of, both, the Church and the State. The assertion of the state's authority was embodied by the extension of Protestant settlements in the north of Ireland, at the expense of the Old English and Native Irish. However, he also targeted the Protestant New English settlers with the Star Chamber. This punished those who possessed land that was not well documented enough. The authority of the Church was supported by the Court of High Commission and consisted of policies, which aimed to see a change towards Laudianism. These policies united Catholic and Protestant opposition against him.

== See also ==
- Personal Rule
- Royal prerogative in the United Kingdom
- Laudianism
- Council of the North
- History of Ireland (1536–1691)
- Wars of the Three Kingdoms
