= Engagement controversy =

The Engagement Controversy was a debate in England from 1649–1652 regarding loyalty to the new regime after Pride's Purge and the execution of Charles I. During this period hundreds of pamphlets were published in England supporting 'engagement' to the new regime or denying the right of English citizens to shift their allegiance from the deposed king to Oliver Cromwell and his associates.

In 1650 the statement of engagement took the form: "I do declare and promise, that I will be true and faithful to the Commonwealth of England, as it is now established, without a King or House of Lords."

Participants in the debate are generally regarded either as de facto theorists or royalists. De facto theorists advocated loyalty to any government capable of taking power and maintaining internal peace and order. They argued that unless people are willing to accept any government that can protect them, mankind would be doomed to perpetual civil war. Most royalists argued that the people of England were already 'engaged' to the King, and could not change their loyalties.
