= Christie Barlow =

British author of women's fiction

- Education: Sir John Deane's College
- Occupation: Author
- Writing career
- Genre: Romantic comedy
- Subject: Women's fiction
- Website: christiebarlow.com

Christie Barlow is a British author of women's fiction.

== Education ==
Barlow grew up in Northwich, Cheshire where she attended Weaverham High School and Sir John Deane's College.

== Work ==
Barlow self-published her first novel A Year in the Life of a Playground Mother in June 2014. This reached number one in the UK and USA on the Amazon Kindle chart.

In 2015, she secured a publishing contract with publisher Bookouture to republish her two existing titles and three new books. In 2016, she secured a contract with HarperCollins.

She is an ambassador for the charity The Zuri Project Uganda.

== Personal life ==
Barlow lives in Staffordshire with her four children whom she credits as her inspiration.

== Bibliography ==
- A Year in the Life of a Playground Mother (2014)
- The Misadventures of a Playground Mother (2015)
- Kitty's Countryside Dream (2016)
- Lizzie's Christmas Escape (2016)
- Evie's Year of Taking Chances (2017)
- The Cosy Canal Boat Dream (2017)
- A Home at Honeysuckle Farm (2018)
