= John Paget (Puritan minister) =

English clergyman (1574–1638)

- Born: c.1574 Possibly Rothley, England
- Died: 18 August 1638; Amsterdam, Netherlands
- Education: University of Cambridge
- Occupations: Anglican clergyman, Dutch Reformed pastor
- Years active: 1598–1637
- Spouse: Briget Masterson
- Children: Childless. Adopted nephew, Robert Paget.

Ecclesiastical career
- Religion: Calvinist, Presbyterian
- Church: Church of England, Dutch Reformed Church
- Writings: A Primary of the Christian Religion (1601); An arrovv against the separation of the Brownists (1618); Wisdomes Bountie to Heauenly Pilgrims (1622); Meditations of Death (1639); A Defence Of Church-Government, Exercised in Presbyteriall, Classicall, & Synodall Assemblies (1641); A Censure upon a Dialogue of the Anabaptists (1642).
- Offices held: Rector of St Mary's Church, Nantwich; Chaplain to English forces in the Netherlands; Pastor of English Reformed Church, Amsterdam.

John Paget (c.1574 – 18 August 1638) was an English nonconforming clergyman, who became pastor at the English Reformed Church, Amsterdam. He was a steadfast defender of Presbyterianism and orthodox Calvinism in numerous controversies with English exiles in the Dutch Republic.

== Origins ==
John Paget seems to have been descended from the Paget family of Rothley, which is on the edge of Charnwood Forest in Leicestershire. He and Thomas Paget, his younger brother and fellow Puritan minister, were possibly born there or elsewhere in the county. His nephew and adopted son, Robert Paget, described himself as, Licestrensis, "a Leicestershire man", on registration at Leiden University in 1628, suggesting that John and Thomas Paget had at least one brother who continued to live in the county. The vicar of Rothley in 1564 was Harold Paget and the family's connection with the village was long-lasting: a memorial window to family members was dedicated in the parish church in 1897.

== Education ==
John Paget entered Trinity College, Cambridge as a sizar, a scholar receiving some support, probably in 1592, suggesting a birth date around 1574. He graduated B.A. in 1595, and proceeded M.A. in 1598.

== Early career ==
=== Rector of Nantwich ===
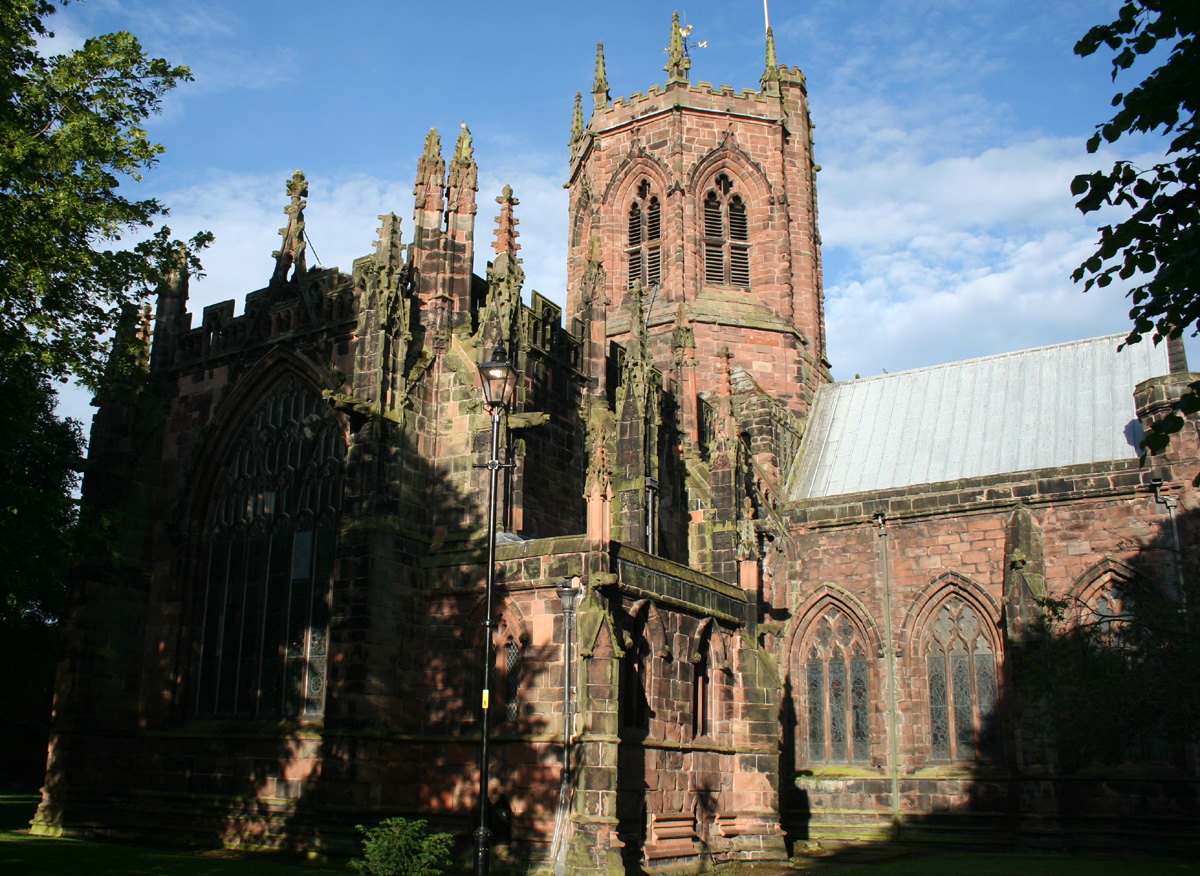
St Mary's Church, Nantwich, where Paget was incumbent at the beginning of his career. The church building was restored in the 19th century.

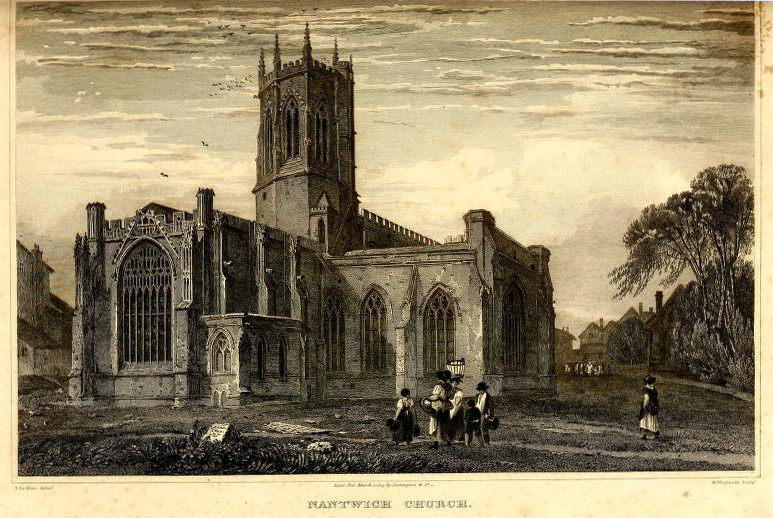
Print of St Mary's Church, Nantwich, before the 19th century restoration.

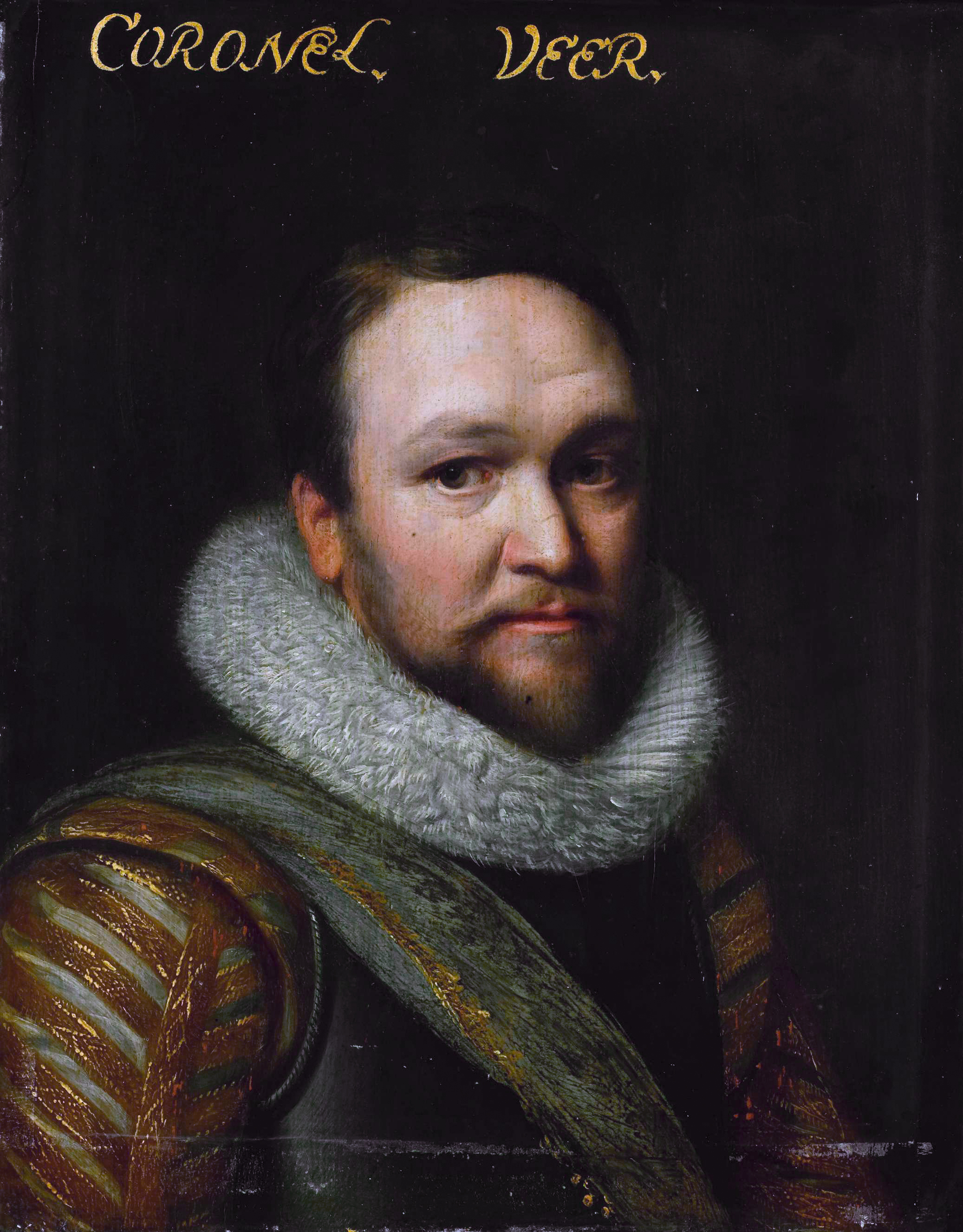
Sir Horace Vere by Michiel Jansz. van Mierevelt

Paget related in An Answer to the Unjust Complaints, a polemical work, that his "ardent affection" or inner compulsion to preach manifested itself at an early age. By 1598, the year of his MA, he had already been appointed rector of Nantwich in Cheshire. James Hall, a distinguished Victorian historian of the town, implies Paget first appeared in the town as a preacher under the previous incumbent, William Holford. In 1601 he had his first book published in London: A Primer of Christian Religion, or a forme of Catechising, drawne from the beholding of Gods works. In 1602 he married Briget or Bridget the daughter of Richard Masterson and widow of George or John Thrushe.

Paget's Puritan principles must have been well-established by this time. The Puritan perspective was put forward to James I soon after his succession in the Millenary Petition, which prompted him to set up the Hampton Court Conference of 1604. The response of Richard Bancroft, the new Archbishop of Canterbury, was a book of canons, later rejected by Parliament, which demanded conformity to the disciplines, not just the teachings, of the Church of England. Twelve Cheshire clergy refused to subscribe to the canons and some were imprisoned or fled to the Dutch Republic. Paget's nonconformity forced him to leave Nantwich. In 1605 he went to the Netherlands.

=== Military chaplain ===
Paget's migration from England took him into a war zone, as the Dutch were in the midst of the Eighty Years' War to secure their independence from Spain. It also took him into Dutch employment, although initially under English direction. For two years Paget was chaplain to the English troops fighting under Sir John Ogle and Sir Horace Vere. Ogle commanded one of four units and was second-in-command of the whole force, while Vere commanded another and had overall leadership of the English contingents, which since 1598 had been paid by the Dutch and formed part of the Dutch army. 1605 saw the English troops fighting well outside the Netherlands, alongside a Scottish force as well as Dutch troops, at Mülheim an der Ruhr, where they saved the day and suffered heavy casualties. Paget must have had a strenuous period of pastoral work and preaching in such difficult circumstances.

== Pastor of the English Reformed Church ==
=== Appointment and its background ===
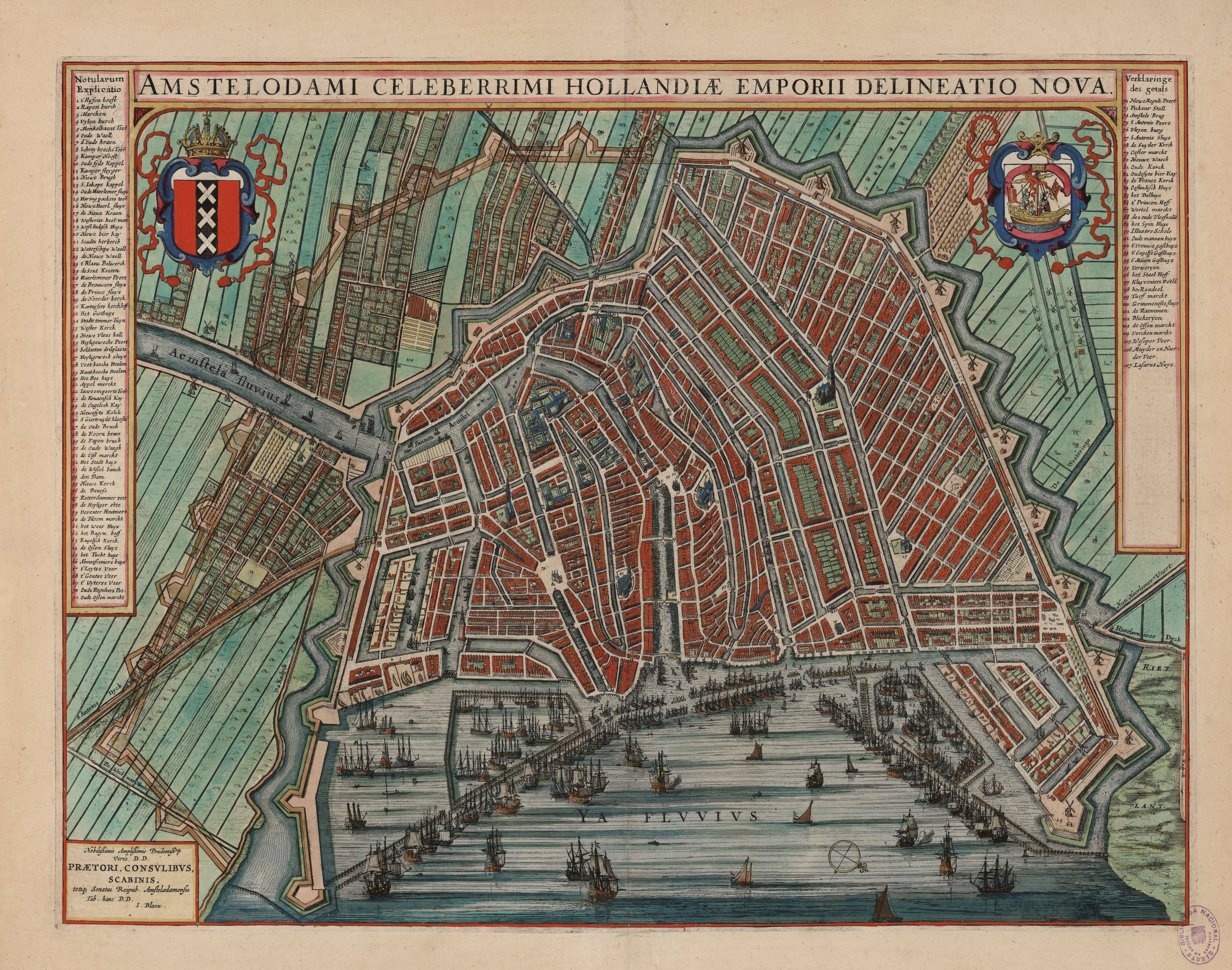
Position of English Reformed Church, marked on a map of Amsterdam, 1649. It is numbered 63 in the map's original legend.

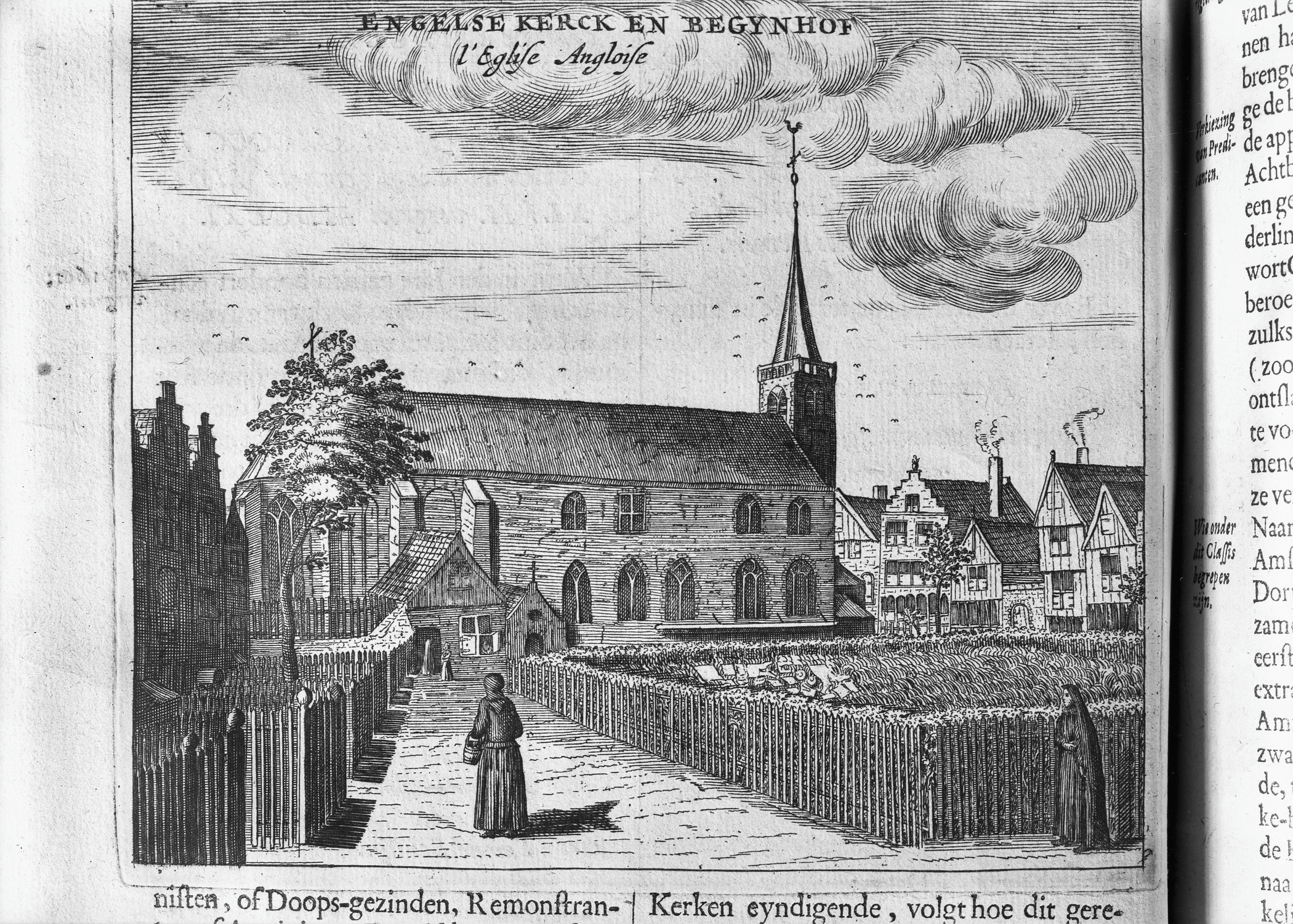
17th century print of the exterior of the English Reformed Church, from Beschrijvinge van Amsterdam by Tobias van Domselaer (1611-85)

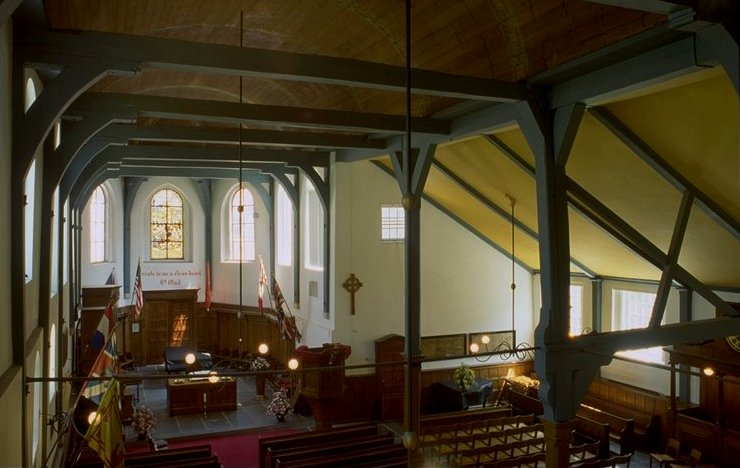
Interior of the English Reformed Church, Amsterdam. The text for Paget's inaugural sermon is discernible on the wall behind the communion table.

Paget's work clearly attracted favourable attention, as in 1607 the Presbytery of Amsterdam appointed him minister of the newly founded English Reformed Church in the city. The church building had belonged to the semi-monastic Beguines: the square in which it stands is still called the Begijnhof The Beguine's chapel had been rebuilt in the 1490s after a fire and had lain disused since they had been expropriated by the city authorities in 1578. After receiving the call from the presbytery Paget preached an inaugural sermon on 5 February on the text Psalms 51:10: "Make thou unto me a cleane heart O Lord" in the Bishops' Bible. In the later King James Version it runs: "Create in me a clean heart, O God," words that were later inscribed on the wall of the sanctuary. On 29 April he was formally admitted to office. The ceremony was performed by John Douglas, chaplain to the Scottish force stationed at Utrecht, which had fought alongside the English contingents at Mülheim.

Paget's church was entirely separate from the fissile and quarrelsome English Calvinist community that had existed in Amsterdam for some years, which was Barrowist or Brownist in orientation: committed to separation from the Church of England. From about 1600 its pastor was Francis Johnson, whose assistant was Henry Ainsworth. Paget was from the outset concerned to distinguish his congregation from these as the "English Orthodoxicall church." On the other hand, he rejected any use of the Book of Common Prayer and Anglican ritual. He was committed to the Amsterdam classis and the Presbyterian polity for which it stood. The church was English in language rather than ethnicity: an English-language branch of the Dutch Reformed Church, with affinities to the Church of Scotland, although it was not formally affiliated to it until the following century.

=== Prosperity ===
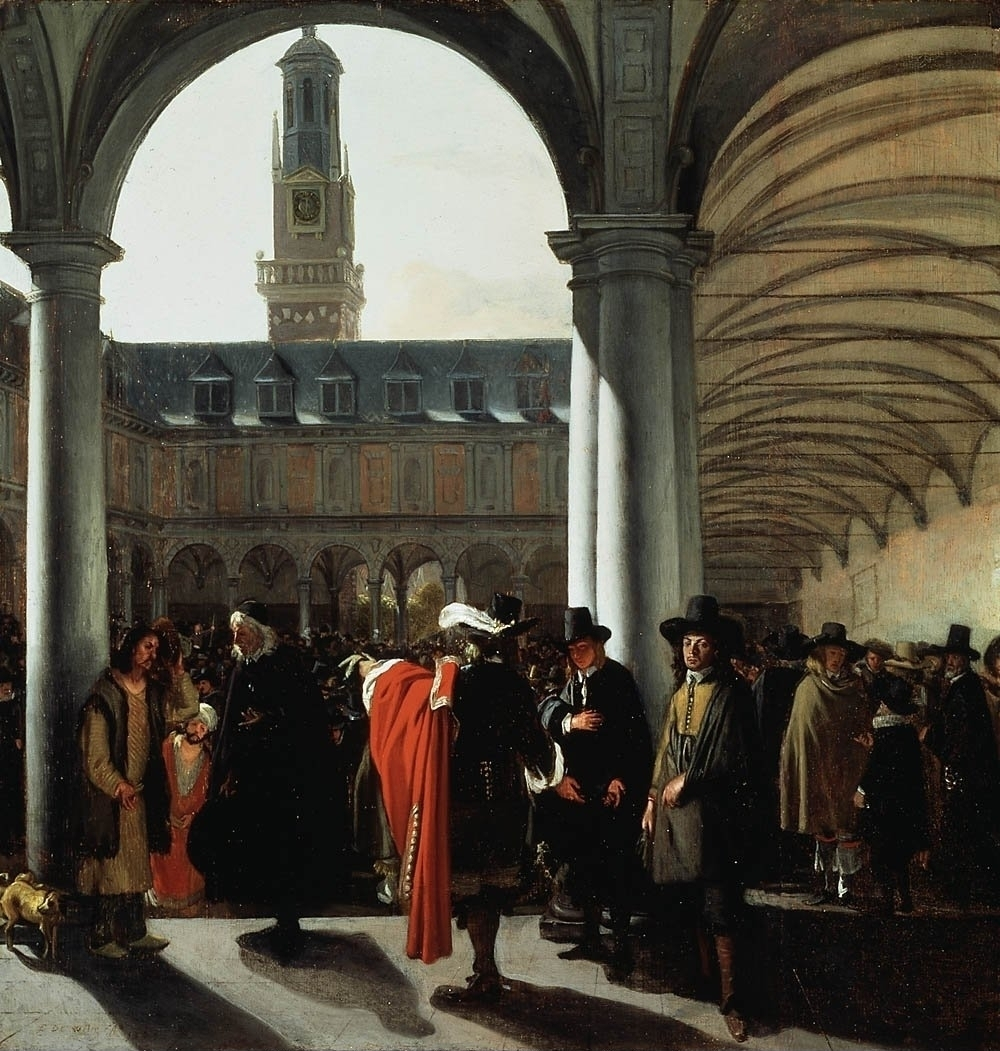
Courtyard of the Amsterdam Stock Exchange by Emanuel de Witte, 1653.

Paget seems to have prospered in his new post. His stipend from the Dutch church was a substantial 150 florins. His wife Briget certainly joined him in Amsterdam, if she had not before, and they owned at least two houses: this is known because Briget's sale of them was recorded in 1647, almost a decade after Paget's death.

The Pagets built up sufficient wealth to buy shares in the Dutch West India Company. This was launched with the authorization of the States General of the Netherlands in 1621, in response to the ending of the Twelve Years' Truce (1609–21) between the Dutch Republic and Spain. The new turn in foreign policy was the work of a coalition of powerful Amsterdam merchants, the Counter-remonstrants or extreme Calvinists and Maurice, Prince of Orange which had overthrown the architect of the truce, Johan van Oldenbarnevelt. The Pagets' investment represented a political and religious as well as financial commitment. The West India Company was intended from the outset to strike at the economic power of Catholic Spain and Portugal. However, its military commitments made it less profitable than its revenues from plantation slavery and sugar seemed to promise. There was the bonanza of a 75% dividend for the year 1629–30, following the capture of the Mexican silver fleet. This must have been a boon to the Pagets, as it was in 1631 that they faced the arrival of Thomas Paget, former incumbent of Blackley Chapel, and his family as refugees from England. However, it was more or less the end of profitability and the fortunes of the Company were dogged by internal divisions between different religious and regional factions during the 1630s.

=== Controversies and conflicts ===
Paget was very careful to keep his congregation distinct from other English-speaking congregations, both in Amsterdam and in the Netherlands more generally. Within a year of his taking up his post, possibly earlier, there was an English Baptist group, centred on John Smyth, in Amsterdam alongside his own and Johnson's congregations. Paget's aloofness can only have been reinforced by the internal divisions and the later confusions as the remnants of this group fused with the Dutch Mennonites known as Waterlanders after Smyth's death. He resolutely opposed what he regarded as schismatics of every kind. This included the more radical Calvinists. Key issues included formal prayer and an ordained ministry, which were rejected by Henry Ainsworth, Thomas Baker and other Brownist-influenced leaders, as Paget noted in his 1618 riposte, An Arrow Against the Separation of the Brownistes, the occasion for which he claimed was:

a certaine mayde who pretendeth that she is troubled to ioyne with our Church because of the use of the Lords prayer among us; because of my calling unto this Church, whereof I am a Minister, which calling he (Baker) tells her is unlawfull; & because there is no difference betwixt us and the Church of England...

Paget dealt with issue of formal prayer, specifically the Lord's Prayer, in Chapter 2 of the Arrow, rebutting what he regarded as Ainsworth's misconceptions about practice in the Presbyterian church. However, his key argument was that such an issue was adiaphorous, or at least no grounds for separation and withdrawal of communion:

that the saying of this prayer by rote even in the worst sense without feeling and understanding could be no warrant for the people to separate from us, though it should be our sin so to use it.

Ainsworth and Baker were proponents of a Congregationalist polity that Paget firmly rejected in favour of the Presbyterian polity existing in the Netherlands and Scotland. They had broken with Johnson over Ainsworth's contention that authority rested in the whole congregation, not just the elders, as well as separating themselves from Paget's congregation and from the Church of England. Paget was vituperative in his assault on separatism, taking Ainsworth to task for his allegedly patchy record.

Let it be well observed that you are thus noted to have turned your coate & changed your religion five severall times, namely, first being of our religion and a member of the church of England you forsook that Church and separated: Secondly that being separated, you did againe in London being in the hãds of authoritie yeeld to joyne with the worship and ministery of the Church of England: Thirdly, that after this you did againe slide back vnto the separation and renounce the Church of England: Fourthly, that after this when you were in Ireland and in some danger of punishment for your scandal, you did againe returne vnto the communion renounced by you, whether fainedly or vnfainedly, I leave vnto your self to consider: Fiftly, after this you change your profession againe and fall back vnto separation, and stick now presently in this Schisme: and thus whiles by this often revolting you dishonour and disable your self and your ministery...

In 1621 John Forbes, the Scottish pastor at Delft, obtained permission from the Dutch authorities to set up an English classis or presbytery for the Netherlands. Paget opposed the establishment of the classis and refused to have anything to do with it. He obtained the backing of the Amsterdam Dutch Reformed classis and of the North Holland synod for his stance – support which the Dutch institutions maintained despite direct personal approaches from Forbes and his circle. The first reason Paget gave for keeping his distance related to theological and ecclesiological differences:

the Ministers of England which come over hither are of severall & inconsistent opinions differing from one another & from all reformed churches, as expressely that some are Brownists, some Brownistically affected in particular opinions, as 1. in allowing private men to preach, 2. In denying formes of praier, 3. In admitting Brownists to their Congregations...

His other major reason was practical: he considered the geographical dispersion of the English congregations made the operation of a separate classis unworkable, as the regular meetings required for effective supervision would be impossible. This was a problem, he maintained, that had already vitiated the operation of a French or Walloon classis. The 1630s saw a considerable shift in the political situation and the nature of the theological opposition to Paget. In 1631 members of his own congregation tried to bring in Thomas Hooker as an assistant pastor, and in 1634 the preferred candidate was John Davenport. These were proponents of a Congregationalist tendency, associated with the teachings of William Ames and Henry Jacob, that was not separatist, although Paget regarded it as semi-separatist.

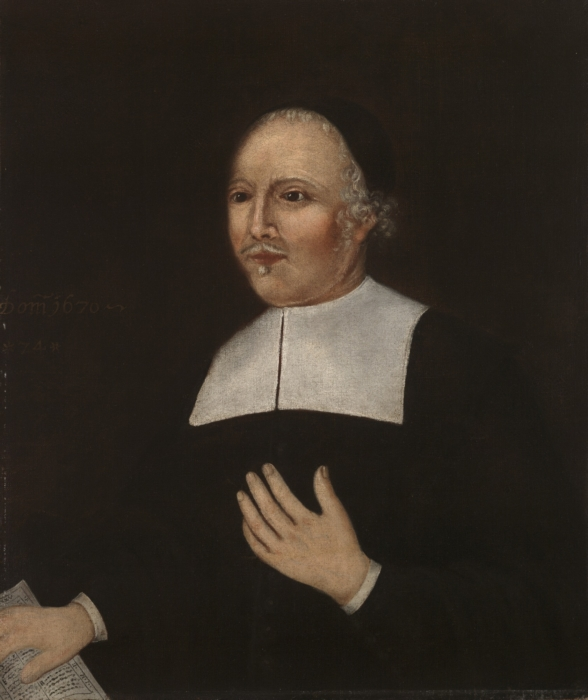
Portrait of John Davenport in old age, 1670. Yale University Art Gallery

Sir William Boswell arrived as English ambassador to the Netherlands in 1632 both complicating the situation and reinforcing the resistance to separatism. Initially he intervened to warn the Dutch authorities against prohibiting the use of the Prayer Book by Stephen Goffe, now chaplain to Vere's regiment, and engineered the removal of Forbes from his post at Delft, replacing him with a Laudian. However, Goffe fed Boswell information about the activities of Davenport and he was in turn strongly influenced by Paget, who wanted good relations with Boswell, in his estimate of the situation. The issues and alliances were set out in a letter from Goffe at Leiden, probably dated 28 February 1634.

I hope you have receaved a lettre from Amsterdam on Sunday w^{ch} did acquaint you with the comming of m^{r} vnto you, & the cause of it. And by this time m^{r} Damport appearing to you hath shewed the truth of it. Since that m^{r} Pagett hath given me another relacion w^{ch} with his most humble service he desired me to make knowne vnto yowr selfe: vnto whom he desires to approve himselfe, and give account of his actions. After that in many discourses with m^{r} Damport He had found his difference from him in the poynt of Baptisme, w^{ch} is not only a matter of judgement but practice both ministers joyning in baptizing every child according to the Dutch custome ((1) one reading the forme, & explicacion of it. and the other sprinkling the water with those words In the name &c.) He told him that it was necessary for him to admit all the infants w^{ch} were brought, as he & the Dutch alwaies vse to do, or els they could not be fitt colleges in that pastorall charge. Herevpon Damport & his frends made the first cry, complained to the Dutch ministers, obtained of two of them, to come vnto m^{r} Pagett, to reprehend him for his difficulty in admitting so reverend a College &c.

On 9 March Goffe wrote to update Boswell on proceedings in the Amsterdam classis, relying on information from John Paget's kinsman, perhaps Robert Paget. Paget was willing to recognise Davenport as his assistant only on his own terms, which presumably included continuing infant baptism. Davenport himself wrote to Boswell, asserting his personal loyalty to Charles I and his entirely peaceable intentions. Goffe was soon writing of the outrage caused by the radical Calvinists' refusal of communion to men otherwise considered in good standing with their churches. Davenport denounced Paget as an "unjust doer," tyrannical in government and corrupt in doctrine. However, Griffin Higgs, the chaplain to Charles I's sister, Elizabeth Stuart, Queen of Bohemia, commented: "M^{r}. Damport is still a Non-Conformist to the Dutch Church as well, as to the English." The Dutch ecclesiastical authorities generally took, or were induced to take, Paget's side and he saw off all challengers. In 1635 he concluded hostilities with An Answer to the Unjust Complaints, a broadside against Davenport and William Best, who in reality was a cipher for John Canne, a separatist who had migrated to Amsterdam some years earlier.

=== Contacts and alliances ===
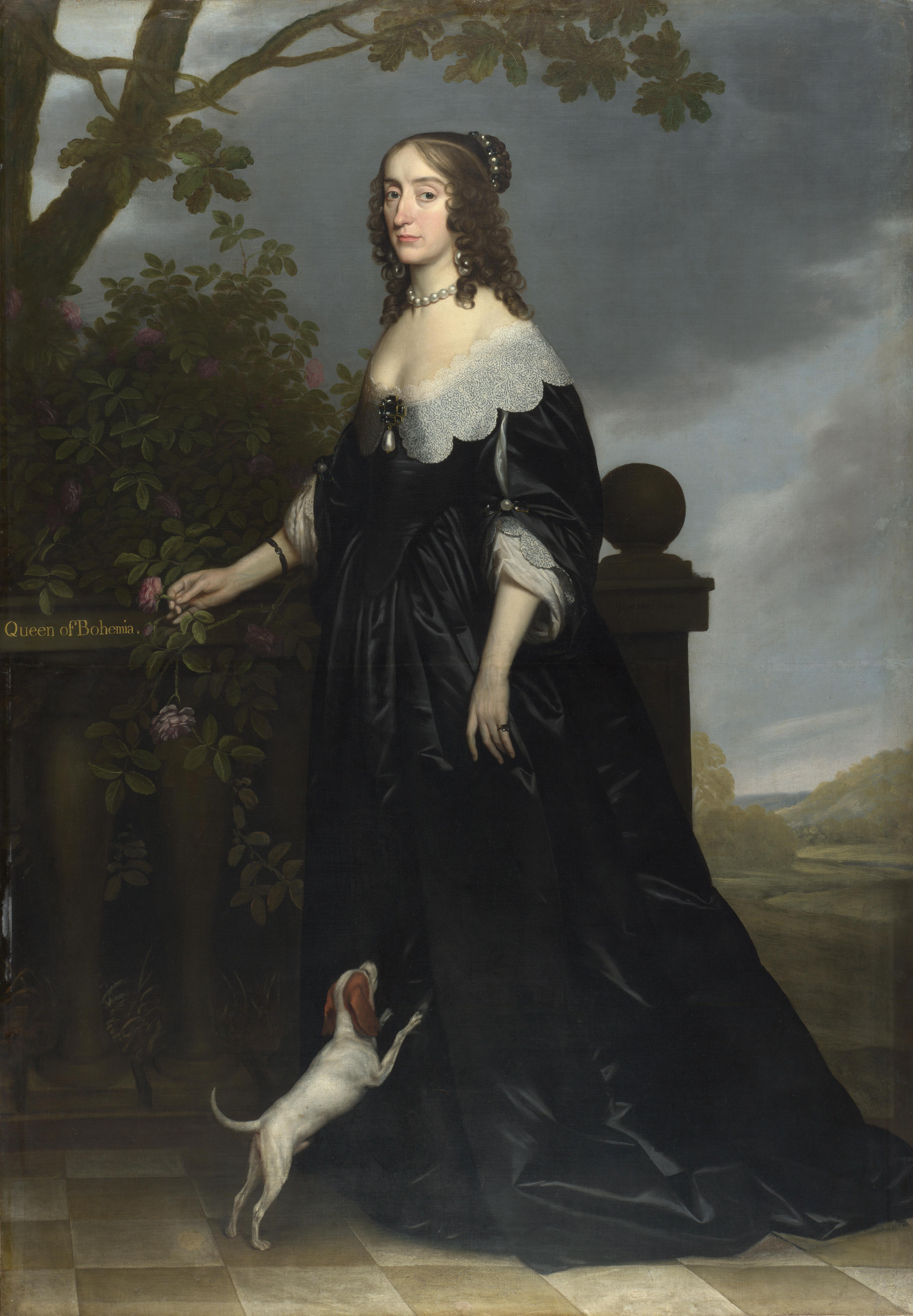
Elizabeth of Bohemia, painted in 1642 by Gerard van Honthorst

Although a combative and sometimes bitter controversialist, Paget had a wide range of contacts, political and scholarly. Despite his nonconformist status in England, he cultivated relations with the English and Scottish authorities where Protestant solidarity in the Thirty Years War was concerned. His contact with Boswell seems to have been cordial. He enjoyed the friendship of Elizabeth of Bohemia, an important figurehead in the wider European conflict and Briget Paget seems to have been especially close to Elizabeth. One of Boswell's most important tasks was to promote Elizabeth's interests and Paget's relations with him seem to have been sustained. To reassure Boswell of his essential orthodoxy, he lent him a copy of his own service book, partly translated from the Dutch liturgy, signing off with the words: "The God of heaven be with you & cover you with the shadow of his winges."

John Dury, an eirenic Scottish Protestant minister, who had close contacts with the Jewish community, was another important contact. Evidently he was a guest preacher at the English Reformed Church, as Paget and his congregation wrote to him on 5 November 1634 to congratulate him on a recent sermon and to invite him again to Amsterdam. The invitation found its way into the papers of Samuel Hartlib, a German scientist and polymath who had taken refuge in England from the Thirty Years War: an indication of the width of the intellectual circle in which Paget moved.

Amsterdam had a substantial and growing Jewish community, the Sephardim alone numbering about 800 in 1626 and 1200 in 1655. Although they did not enjoy full civil rights until the following century, they were respected by leading Dutch Calvinist intellectuals like Hugo Grotius, who consulted with Jewish scholars on the text of the Hebrew Bible. The English and Scottish exiles followed suit. Paget was described by Robert, his nephew and adopted son, as having

rare skill in the languages that conduce unto the understanding of the originall text of the Scriptures; for he could to good purpose and with much ease make use of the Chaldean, Syriack, Rabbinicall, Thalmudicall, Arabick, and Persian versions and commentaries.

He was part of a learned circle that included the much-maligned Ainsworth, Hugh Broughton and Matthew Slade. However, Paget was more cautious and conservative in adopting readings and interpretations from Jewish scholars than philo-semitic interpreters like Ainsworth and Dury. His reservations were set out in An Admonition touching Talmudique allegations, which was appended to An Arrow Against the Separation of the Brownistes. Here he made clear that one of his motivations in using Jewish sources was to employ them controversially against Judaism. The interest in Judaism, its Scripture and its intellectual traditions was spreading within Dutch Calvinist culture and Leiden University was at its centre. Joseph Justus Scaliger had pioneered Semitic studies there and in 1625 the university press acquired an oriental section, with fonts for a range of Afroasiatic languages, on the initiative of the House of Elzevir. It was also the university most closely associated with overseas trade and expansion. Two of John Paget's nephews were sent to Leiden for their education: Robert in 1628 and Nathan in 1638. In the quarter century 1626–50 Leiden drew 52% of its students from abroad.

Paget continued to cultivate contacts in his native country and was often visited by English travellers. One of the most notable was Sir William Brereton, 1st Baronet, the future Roundhead commander, who visited the United Provinces in 1634 and reported:

June 12.— After we had dined with Mr. Pageatt, where we had a neat dinner and strawberries, longest that I have seen, we went to a house called Dole-hoof, where we saw the pictures made in wax most liveyly...

== Last years and death ==
John Paget remained in post until 1637, when he became emeritus. It is possible that he was already ill. Samuel Hartlib heard in July 1638 that Paget was recovering from an illness. However he died only about a month later, on 18 August 1638, probably in the vicinity of Amsterdam. Thomas Paget (d. 1660), his brother, then served the English Church at Amsterdam, alongside Julines Herring, until he returned to England in 1646 to become incumbent of St Chad's Church, Shrewsbury.

== Marriage, family and legacy ==
John Paget and his relatives

Richard Maisterson (died 1617) of Nantwich	Elizabeth Grosvenor (died 1627) of Eaton Hall, Cheshire
John Thrushe	Briget Masterson	John Paget (died 1638), Puritan clergyman and theologian
Robert Paget, nephew and adopted son, Presbyterian minister and editor

Parents unknown, probably of Rothley, Leicestershire	Nicholas Goldsmith (died 1616), mercer of Nantwich	Dorothy
(2) Unknown	Thomas Paget (c.1587–1660), Puritan clergyman and controversialist	(1) Margery Goldsmith (1588–1628)	Ellen Goldsmith (1583–1624)	Richard Minshull (1575–1658)
Thomas Paget (born c.1638), clergyman and theologian.	Anne Boote	Randle Minshull (1605–1660)	Thomas Minshull (born 1613), apothecary of Manchester
Elizabeth Cromwell (1614–65), cousin of Oliver Cromwell	Nathan Paget (1615–79), physician	Elizabeth Minshull	John Milton

John Paget married Briget Thrush, née Masterson or Maisterson, on 8 February 1602 in St Mary's Church, Nantwich. The Mastersons were the oldest-established of Nantwich's wealthy merchant families. The marriage was childless but they adopted as their heir Robert Paget, nephew of John and Thomas, who was minister at Dordrecht 1638-85. After John Paget's death, Briget acted as his literary executor and moved to live with Robert at Dordrecht. Together with Thomas and Nathan Paget, they transmitted John's intellectual legacy to later generations of Puritans and nonconformists.

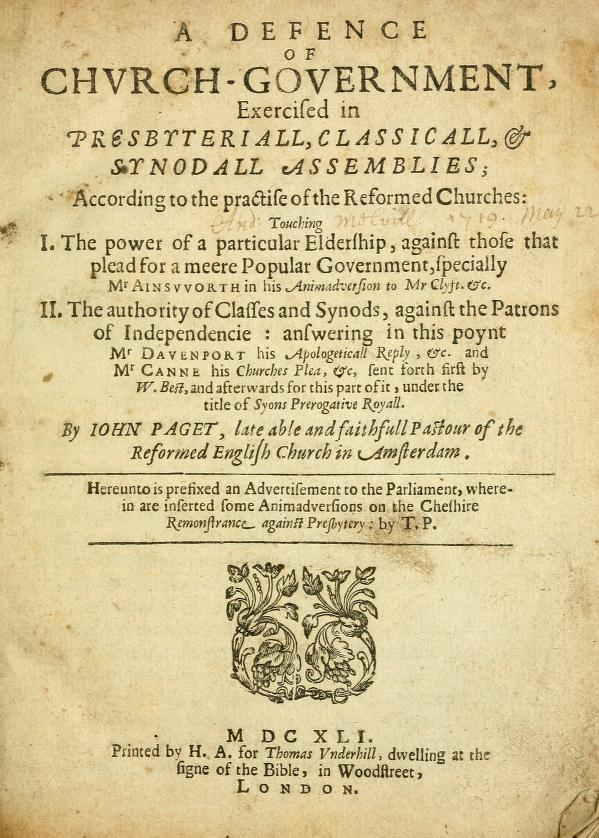
Cover of A Defence Of Church-Government.

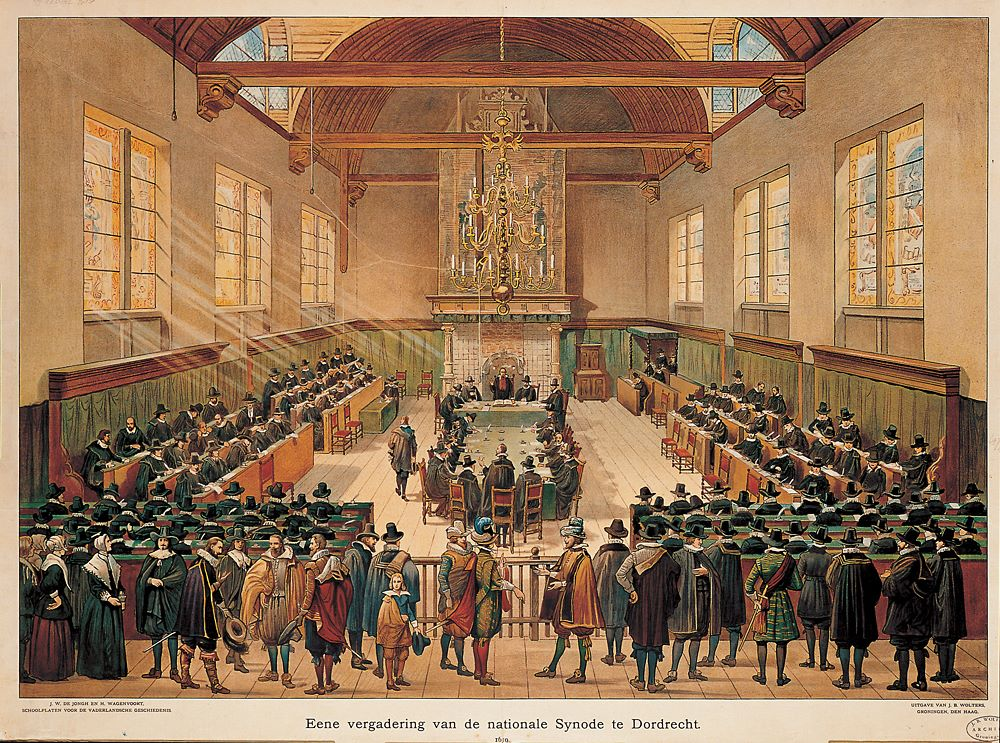
Synod of Dort, 1618. The Canons of Dort became a key definition of Calvinist orthodoxy.

Briget and Robert first issued John's Meditations of Death in 1639, with a preface over Robert's name. Briget wrote the dedication, which was to Elizabeth of Bohemia. Next, in 1641, came John's Defence of Church-government, a detailed exposition and defence of the Presbyterian polity as he had practised and experienced it in Amsterdam. The preface, again credited to Robert Paget, situated the work within John Paget's controversies with the Amsterdam separatists. Robert's concluding peroration began with the words: "Farewell from Dort: Where a most pregnant & effectuall testimonie hath been given, for the needfull authority of Synods." This reference to the Synod of Dort placed Paget's work within the mainstream Calvinist tradition by harking back to the past. By this time Charles I's attempts to impose the Prayer Book on an unwilling Scotland had led to the Bishops' Wars and the bankrupting of his attempt at absolute monarchy, forcing him to fall back on Parliament. Thomas Paget, closely following developments in England, re-purposed his brother's book as a political intervention. A Puritan petition from Cheshire to the Long Parliament had proposed the abolition of bishops, canon law, the Prayer Book, and the Thirty-Nine Articles, provoking a concerted response from royalists headed by Sir Thomas Aston, 1st Baronet. Their petition supported episcopacy and denounced all Puritans as "Schismatiques and Separatists." Aston published alongside it a collection of documents under the title A Remonstrance Against Presbytery. Thomas Paget decided to present his brother's book to Parliament, adding by way of dedication a "Humble Advertisment" [sic], which explained the history of nonconformity in the Diocese of Chester and highlighted his own sufferings for the cause, as well as distinguishing Presbyterianism from more radical Puritan tendencies. Drawing on their Dutch experience, he pointed out that "The United Netherlands doe finde by experience that Presbytery is no way to conducible to Anarchie."

Thomas was later to return to England to serve as a minister under the Commonwealth of England and the Protectorate. Nathan Paget, his son and John's nephew, had already returned to pursue his career as a physician and lived in London throughout the English Civil War. He sustained the contacts with polyglot and polymath circles and the interest in Hebrew he had acquired from his uncle. He married Elizabeth Cromwell, cousin of Oliver Cromwell, and became a close friend of John Milton, sharing his interest in radical political and religious ideas. A distinguished member of the College of Physicians, his career was affected little if at all by the Restoration.

== Works ==
John Paget's works comprise:

- Paget, John (1601), A Primary of the Christian Religion, London
- Paget, John (1618), An arrovv against the separation of the Brownists. Also an admonition tovching Talmudique & rabbinical allegations, Amsterdam, OL 24649449M
- P[aget], I[ohn] (1622), Wisdomes Bountie to Heauenly Pilgrims, In middest of their manifold distractions: Unmasking the Man of Sinne, against the battell of the great day, London: G. Eld (printer) I. Budre (folder), OL 24994874M. This contains:

- P[aget], I[ohn] (1622), Anabaptismes Mysterie of Iniquity Unmasked, London: G. Eld (printer) I. Budre (folder), pp. 1–68
- P[aget], I[ohn] (1622), A Description of the Sinne Against the Holy Ghost, London: A.M (printer), George Winder (bookseller), pp. 69–129
- P[aget], I[ohn] (1622), Certain Reasonings Whether the Established Law in our Kingdome, Commanding Kneeling at Receiving the Sacrament of the Lords Supper be to be Obeyed by Christian Subjects, London, pp. 131–42
- P[aget], I[ohn] (1622), The Unmasking of the Man of Sinne, London, pp. 1–119 (new series)

- Paget, John (1639), Meditations of Death, Dort (dedicated by his widow to the princess palatine)
- Paget, John (1641), A Defence of Church Government
- Paget, John (1641), A defence of church-government, exercised in presbyteriall, classicall, & synodall assemblies, according to the practise of the reformed churches : touching I. the power of a particular eldership against those that plead for a meere popular government, specially Mr Ainsvvorth in his Animadversion to Mr Clyft, &c. II. the authority of classes and synods, against the patrons of independencie, answering in this poynt Mr Davenport his Apologeticall reply, &c. and Mr Canne his Churches plea ..., London, OL 16875407M
- Paget, John (1642), A Censure upon a Dialogue of the Anabaptists

== See also ==
- Dutch Golden Age
- History of the Calvinist–Arminian debate
- History of the Jews in Amsterdam

== Notes ==
Anglican Communion titles
Preceded by William Holford	Rector of St Mary's Church, Nantwich; 1598–1605	Succeeded by John Bradwall
Dutch Reformed Church titles
Preceded by New post	Pastor of the English Reformed Church, Amsterdam; 1607–37; With: Thomas Potts (1617–35); John Rulitius (from 1636)	Succeeded by Julines Herring; Thomas Paget
