= Briget Paget =

English literary editor and Puritan (1570–c.1647

- Born: Briget Masterson; 1570; Nantwich, Kingdom of England
- Died: c. 1647; Dordrecht, Dutch Republic
- Occupation: Literary editor
- Years active: 1638–1641
- Known for: Editing and one dedication to posthumous publications of John Paget
- Notable work: Work on Meditations of Death, A Defence Of Church-Government, Exercised in Presbyteriall, Classicall, & Synodall Assemblies.
- Spouses: George Thrushe (died 1601); John Paget (m. 1602; died 1638)

Briget Paget (née Masterson; (1570–c. 1647) was an English literary editor and Puritan, known for acting the literary executor and editor for her husband John Paget.

== Origins and background ==
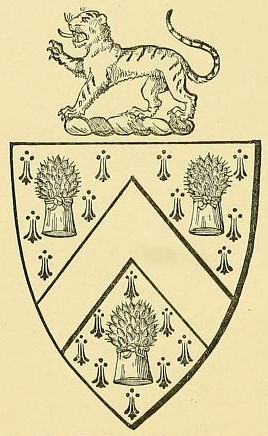
Arms of the Masterson or Maisterson family of Nantwich.

Briget Masterson (also rendered "Maisterson") was the daughter of

- Richard Masterson (died 1617) of Nantwich, son of Roger Masterson and Elizabeth Walthall.
- Elizabeth Grosvenor (died 1627), daughter of Sir Thomas Grosvenor of Eaton Hall, Cheshire and Maud Poole.

The Mastersons were the oldest-established of the families that made up Nantwich's merchant oligarchy but had numerous branches. Robert Maisterson, an ancestor of Richard, is recorded as holding land at Wich Malbank (the original name for the town) in the reign of Edward I His father was Siwardus ("victory guardian") Magisterson and his grandfather Swayn ("boy") filius Magistri. Both personal names suggest a Viking origin and seem to be in the Norwegian form. The name Magister (Latin: Master) was often applied to the members of the franklin class, the independent freeholders characteristic of areas of Norse settlement. George Ormerod, the early 19th-century historian of Cheshire, pointed out that the Mastersons "never appear to have possessed manorial property in Cheshire, or to have resided in any other seat than a burgage of Nantwich." All branches of the family seem to have invested in residential property and in the salt houses, where the town's mineral wealth was extracted. An inquisition post mortem on an illegitimate member of a cadet branch, William Maisterson, who died in 1495, showed him busily and sometimes illegally acquiring urban property and salt houses under the protection of Sir William Stanley. Briget's branch of the family seem to have prospered fairly slowly but steadily. Her great-grandfather Thomas held lands in Nantwich valued at £18 per annum in 1545: only moderate wealth. However, Richard, her father, seems to have made considerable gains, both in wealth and social standing, at least partly because of a fortunate marriage. The Grosvenors could trace their ancestry back to the Franco-Norman feudal nobility and were clearly of the landed gentry class. Richard was a legatee of his mother-in-law, Dame Maude, who died in 1582. An inquisition after the death of Thomas, his son and Briget's elder brother, who predeceased him in 1604, mentions that Richard's principle house was at Presthume – aptly named as it was formerly the property of Trentham Priory, at this point held of the king, James I, in his role as Earl of Chester. It had a mill and dovecotes was surrounded by 206 acres. It seems that Briget and her siblings were brought up amid considerable comfort. Her later writing indicates that she was probably educated and literate.

== Marriage and exile ==
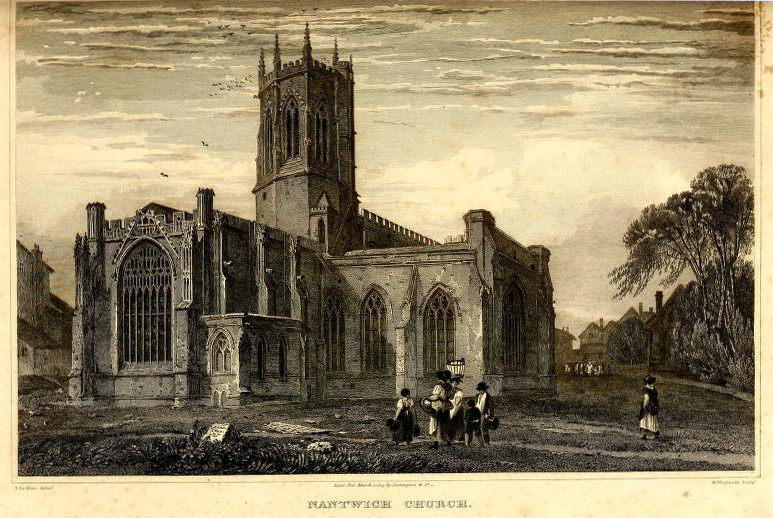
Print of St Mary's Church, Nantwich, before the 19th century restoration.

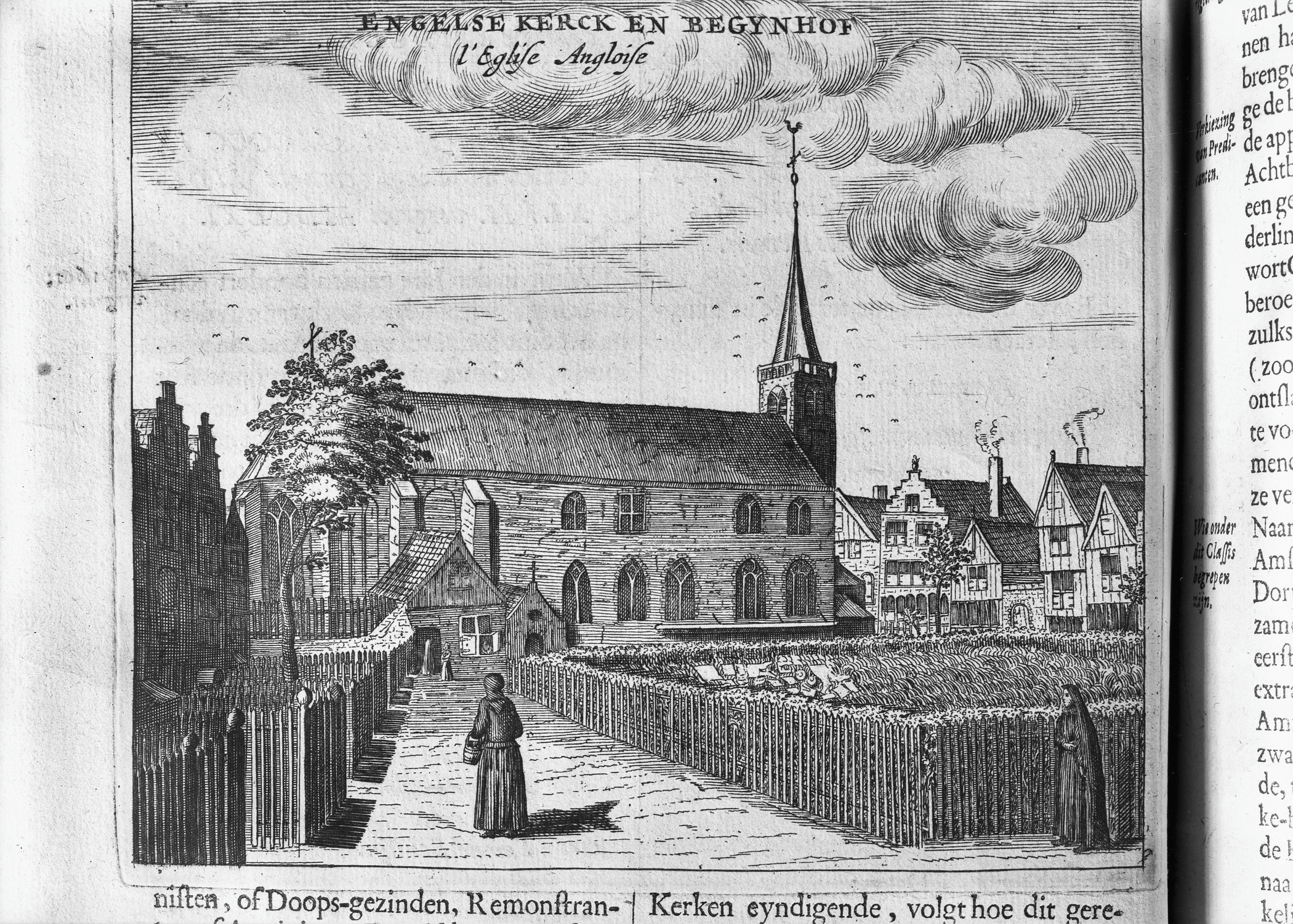
The English Reformed Church, from Beschrijvinge van Amsterdam by Tobias van Domselaer (1611-85)

Briget Masterson married John Paget on 8 February 1602 in St Mary's Church, Nantwich. However, the parish register records her name at that point as "Bridget Thrushe". James Hall, the distinguished Victorian historian of Nantwich found a distinct reference to Briget's earlier marriage in a pedigree preserved at Dorfold Hall, which was in Jacobean times the home of the prominent lawyer Roger Wilbraham, a native of Nantwich:

Brigetta qua nupsit I Thrush deinde Joh. Pigett concionator verbi Dei in Amsterdam in Hollandie.
Briget, who married firstly Thrushe and afterwards John Pigett, preacher of God's Word in Amsterdam, Holland.

This seems to clarify that Briget's marriage to Paget came after the death of her first husband. It seems likely there was only a very brief interlude: the register records George Thrushe being buried on 10 November 1601, after dying of consumption. It seems likely that George Thrushe was Briget's first husband, although Hall also records his name as John in his pedigree of the Masterson family.

Briget's second husband, John Paget, was the Rector of Nantwich, a post he had held since 1598. During 1601 he had published a small instruction book in the Christian faith: A Primer of Christian Religion, or a forme of Catechising, drawne from the beholding of Gods works. This was dedicated to "To my beloved friendes in the Namptwich." He was probably a few years younger than Briget: he had entered Trinity College, Cambridge in 1592, suggesting a birth date around 1574. His Puritan principles must have been well known from his publications and preaching.

The new reign brought a political shift that undermined Paget's position. After initial moves by the Puritans in the Church of England to win over James I, which led him to set up the Hampton Court Conference of 1604, Richard Bancroft, the new Archbishop of Canterbury, imposed a book of canons, later rejected by Parliament, which demanded conformity to the disciplines, not just the teachings, of the Church of England. Paget was one of twelve Cheshire clergy who refused to subscribe to the canons. Some were imprisoned or fled to the Dutch Republic. Paget was forced to leave Nantwich and in 1605 he went to the Netherlands, where he obtained a post as chaplain to English contingents serving within the Dutch army. After he was appointed minister of the newly founded English Reformed Church, Amsterdam in 1607, the couple settled and prospered in the city.

== The Pagets in Amsterdam ==
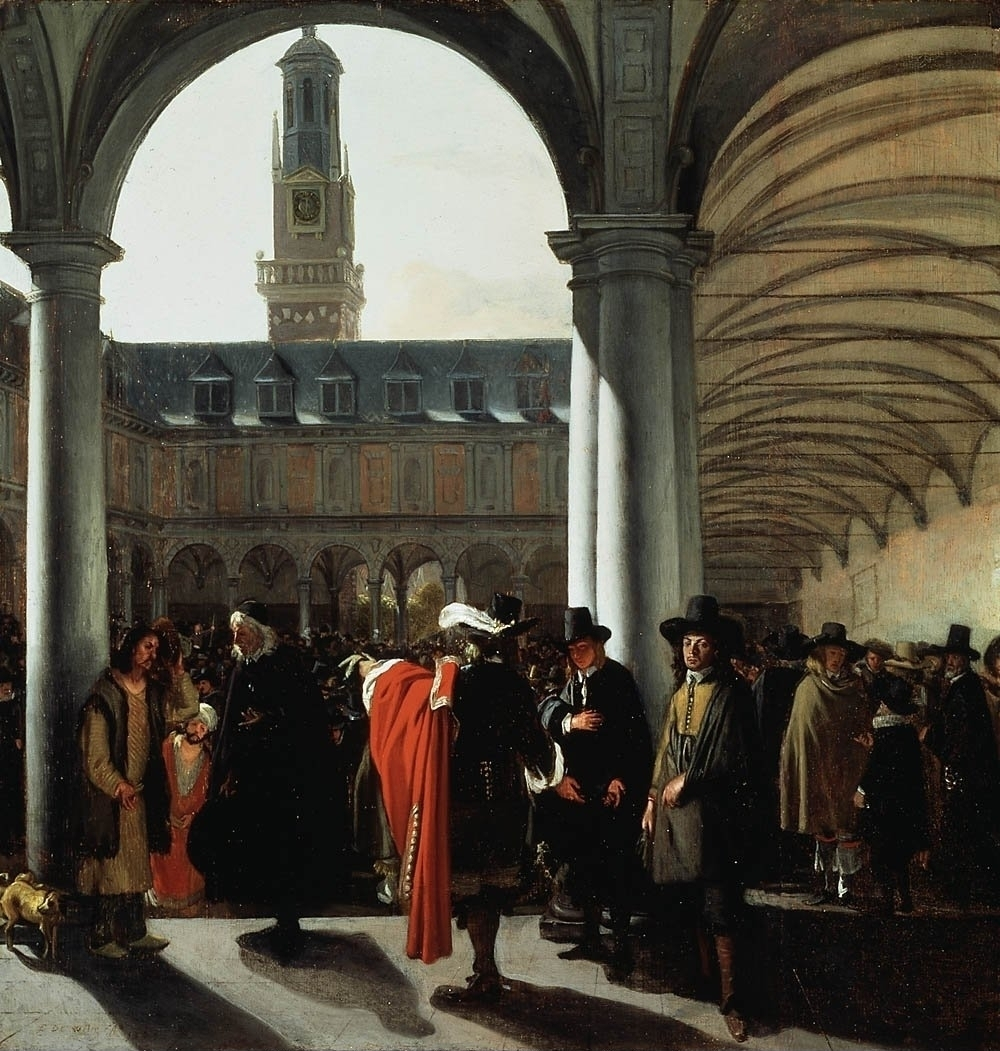
Courtyard of the Amsterdam Stock Exchange by Emanuel de Witte, 1653.

Sir William Brereton portrayed in the 1640s as a Parliamentarian Major General

John Paget was extremely active in exile politics, primarily concerned to combat what he regarded as separatists among his fellow Calvinists. He was also a strong supporter of the Protestant cause internationally, particularly of Frederick V, Elector Palatine, whose elevation to the throne of Bohemia initiated the Thirty Years' War, and of Frederick's queen, Elizabeth Stuart, James I's daughter. Both of these attended worship in the English church at Amsterdam. Briget's later writing suggests that she was personally close to Elizabeth.

The Pagets became wealthy. They owned at least two houses in Amsterdam and bought shares in the Dutch West India Company, launched with the backing of the States General of the Netherlands in 1621, and part of a new aggressive turn in Dutch foreign policy promoted by powerful Amsterdam merchants, the Counter-remonstrants or extreme Calvinists and Maurice, Prince of Orange. Their investment was part of their political stance, as the Company was involved in an offensive against Catholic Spain and Portugal. However, after a huge 75% dividend for the year 1629–30, it yielded little or no income: its defence costs far outstripped its receipts from the Atlantic slave trade and the sugar and dyewood produced by plantation slavery.

Simon Schama has described the tensions between Dutch wealth and Calvinist austerity as an "embarrassment of riches" Foreigners generally had a stereotype of the Dutch as especially well-fed, and it seems that the Pagets conformed to their host country, in quality if not in quantity. Sir William Brereton, an important Cheshire landowner and future Roundhead commander, visited the Pagets in 1634 and was impressed by what he ate at the Pagets' home, particularly the dessert: "a neat dinner and strawberries, longest that I have seen." The Virginia strawberry had only recently been introduced to Europe, and it is unclear whether it was known in England: Brereton noted that John's church was maintained by the Dutch state, which paid him 1100 guilders annually – a good income that Brereton estimated at £110 sterling. There was both anxiety and hostility among the exiled English Calvinists about conspicuous consumption, and this could easily be coupled with pressure on women to conform to restrictive norms. Francis Johnson, an early rival of Paget as leader of a Brownist congregation in Amsterdam, faced a sustained campaign of disruption, instigated by his brother George. This involved a polemical onslaught against Thomasina, his wife, which detailed her expenditure on clothing and mode of dress, as well as her wine consumption and details of her daily routine. Briget Paget's self-presentation seems to have fallen within a conventional pattern of feminine modesty, although she seems to have managed her own money and to have shared and actively promoted her husband's political commitments.

== Family and widowhood ==
Briget and John Paget were childless and adopted as their heir Robert Paget, a nephew of John. They took care of his education: he entered Leiden University on 31 March 1628, describing himself as, Licestrensis, "a Leicestershire man", The Pagets were joined at Amsterdam in 1631 by Thomas Paget, John's brother – another Puritan clergyman who had fled England. Thomas brought with him a young family.

John died on 18 August 1638 and Briget moved to Dordrecht, where Robert had just been appointed minister of a church serving its English and Scottish Calvinists – a position he held for 46 years. Thomas Paget took over as minister at the English Reformed Church in Amsterdam.

== Editor and guardian ==
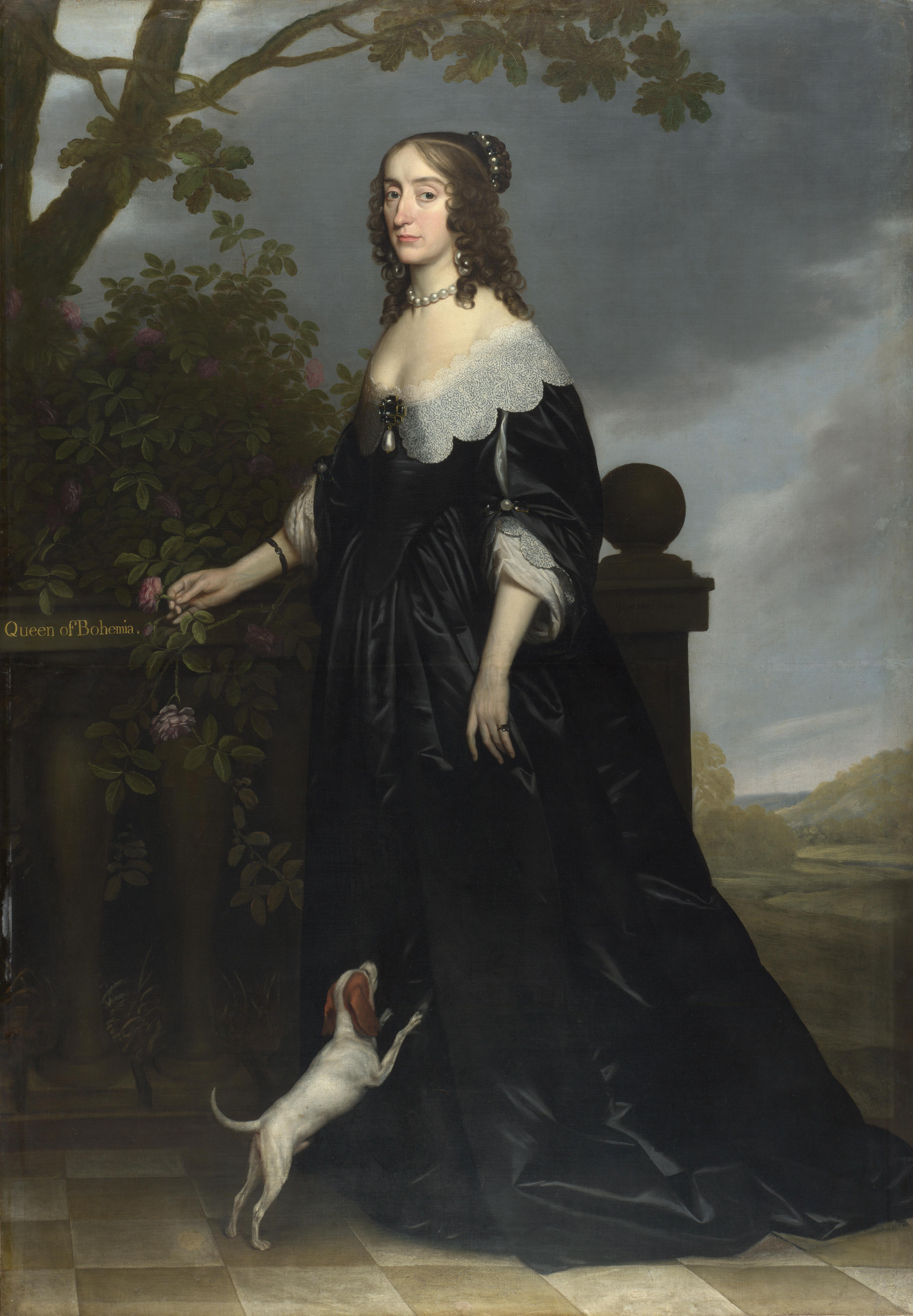
Elizabeth of Bohemia, as portrayed in 1642 by Gerard van Honthorst

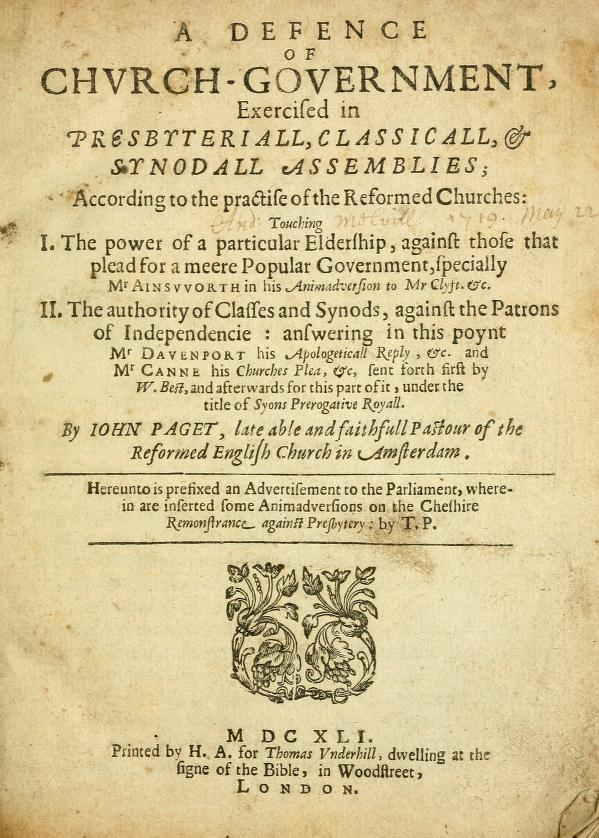
Cover of A Defence Of Church-Government.

After John Paget's death, Briget became the guardian of his literary heritage. In 1639, from Dordrecht, she issued Meditations of death, wherein a Christian is taught how to remember and prepare for his latter end, a previously-unpublished collection of sermons. She wrote the dedication, making clear she was the editor, to Elizabeth of Bohemia, since Frederick's death the figurehead for the Protestant cause. Drawing on the experience of her own loss, she hinted at a close relationship, referring to "the gentle and propitious respects your Majesty hath at sundry times manifested" to John and herself. She assured Elizabeth that divine help might yet restore her to her throne, along with her "princely progeny." The preface to the book was signed by Robert Paget.

In 1641 Briget and Robert Paget brought out A defence of church-government, exercised in presbyteriall, classical, & synodall assemblies. Once again there was a preface by Robert, explaining the context of the work, which lay in John Paget's controversies with the English separatists in Amsterdam. However, publication came just as the conflict between Charles I, Elizabeth's brother, and Parliament reached a critical stage. Thomas Paget therefore contributed by way of dedication a Humble Advertisment [sic] to the high Court of Parliament, presenting the book to the House of Commons. This rehearsed the history of nonconformity in the Diocese of Chester, especially those aspects in which Thomas had personal involvement. It also sought to distinguish the Presbyterian cause from that of more radical Calvinists, with which the royalist agitator Sir Thomas Aston, 1st Baronet had sought to conflate it.

In Cheshire Briget's own family were soon caught up in the English Civil War, most apparently taking the royalist side. In 1642 no Mastersons signed the Remonstrance of the Cheshire commons in support for Parliament Brereton held Nantwich for Parliament after fierce fighting early in 1643. Thomas Masterson, Briget's nephew and the head of the family, suffered sequestration of his estates in 1644 and was forced to compound with a fine of £630. Briget's brother-in-law, Thomas, took the opposite side, returning to England around 1646 to take up the incumbency of Chad's Church in Shrewsbury – a town that had fallen to the Parliamentarians the previous year. Briget never returned to England.

== Later years and death ==
Briget Paget is known to have sold two houses in Amsterdam in 1647. It seems that she died either in that year or some time after. Her will left legacies to Robert Paget and other nephews and nieces.

== Family tree ==
Briget Paget and her relatives

Roger Masterson (died 1580) of Nantwich	Elizabeth Walthall of Nantwich	Maud Poole of Poole, Wirral	Sir Thomas Grosvenor of Eaton Hall, Cheshire
Richard Maisterson (died 1617) of Nantwich	Elizabeth Grosvenor (died 1627)	Unknown Paget, probably of Rothley, Leicestershire
Catherine Dorrington of Cotton, Staffordshire	Thomas Masterson (1582–1604)	1. George Thrushe	Briget Paget née Masterson (1570–c.1647)	2. John Paget (died 1638), Puritan clergyman and theologian	Unknown of Leicestershire	(1) Margery Goldsmith (1588–1628) of Nantwich	Thomas Paget (c.1587–1660), Puritan clergyman and controversialist	(2) Unknown
Thomas Masterson (1604–52), sequestrated 1644	Robert Paget, nephew and adopted son, Presbyterian minister and editor	Elizabeth Cromwell (1614–65), cousin of Oliver Cromwell	Nathan Paget (1615–79), physician	Thomas Paget (born c.1638), clergyman and theologian
