= Weaverham High School =

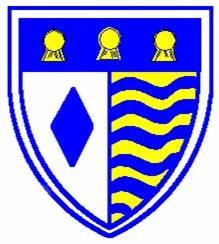

Location
- Lime Avenue; Weaverham, Cheshire, CW8 3HT; England; 53.2601°N 2.5812°W

Information
- Type: Academy
- Established: 1956
- Local authority: Cheshire West and Chester
- Trust: Sandstone Trust
- Department for Education URN: 149614 Tables
- Ofsted: Reports
- Headteacher: Clare Morgan
- Gender: Coeducational
- Age: 11 to 16
- Enrolment: 1,169 as of April 2023
- Colours: Navy Blue/Gold, Red/White
- Website: www.weaverhamhighschool.com

Weaverham High School is a coeducational secondary school located in Weaverham, Cheshire, England.

Weaverham High School is one of the partner high schools of Sir John Deane's College. Many pupils from the school that go on to attend sixth form will apply to Sir John Deane's, and similarly, a large proportion of the sixth form college's intake is from Weaverham High School.

== History ==
In 1997, Weaverham High School was designated an official DfES Technology College, and in 1998 a new computer network was installed, with 380 new workstations and 18 interactive whiteboards. The school now has an interactive whiteboard and a computer in all major classrooms.

Over the last 10 years the school has undergone refurbishment, starting with a new sports hall and all-weather astroturf pitch, a science block, a creative arts centre including a drama studio, a library and learning resource centre and new toilet facilities.

A fire in the mathematics department in 2003 triggered further refurbishments to both the affected department, and the adjacent Design and Technology Department. Previously separate buildings, the two are now joined by an extension built across the path that was previously used as an entrance to both departments.

The school has recently had further construction, adding two science laboratories and new language and geography rooms.

Previously a foundation school administered by Cheshire West and Chester Council, in April 2023 Weaverham High School converted to academy status. The school is now sponsored by the Sandstone Trust.
