= Phil Leeson =

Philip Frank Leeson (1925–2004) was a development economist and communist activist.

== Life ==
He was born in Barnton, Cheshire, was educated at Sir John Deane's grammar school, Northwich, and between 1943 and 1947 served in the British Army (Royal Signals). After his military service he read modern history, economics and politics at the Victoria University of Manchester where he was to spend most of the rest of his working life as an academic lecturing and researching in the University's economics department. He also lectured for the Workers' Educational Association, World Development and UN Association meetings, and to sixth forms – on poverty, aid, debt, and foreign investment.

== Publications ==
- Leeson, P. F.; Minogue, M. M.. Perspectives on Development: Cross-disciplinary themes in development. Manchester University Press
