= Sir John Deane's College =

State school in Cheshire, United Kingdom

Sir John Deane's Sixth Form College
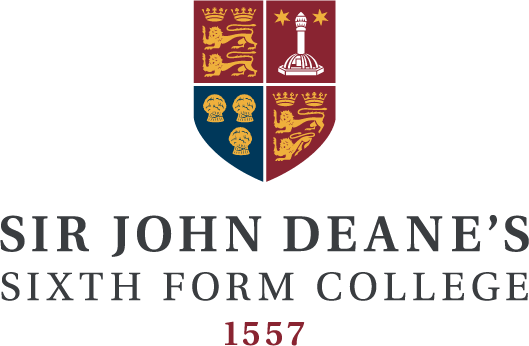
- Sir John Deane's Sixth Form College logo
- Monarch Drive; Northwich; Cheshire; CW9 8AF

Information
- Type: Mixed Sixth Form College
- Established: 1557; 469 years ago
- Department for Education URN: 145748 Tables
- Ofsted: Reports
- Principal: Christopher Atherton
- Information: 01606 810020
- Website: www.sjd.ac.uk

Sir John Deane's Sixth Form College is a sixth form college in Northwich, Cheshire, UK. It was formerly Sir John Deane's Grammar School, which was founded in 1557.

== History ==
For as much as God's glory, his honour, and the wealth public, is advanced and maintained by no means more than by virtuous education and bringing up of Youth under such as be learned and virtuous Schoolmasters, whose good examples may as well instruct them to live well as their doctrine and learning may furnish their minds with knowledge and cunning, [I] have thought it good, not only to erect the said Free Grammar School, and to provide a reasonable and competent Stypend [sic] for the Schoolmaster of the same, and that in respect of the zeal that I have to God's glory, and for the love that I bear to my native country ...

— Sir John Deane, Statutes

Sir John Deane (in the 16th century, the title indicated a presbyter with a university degree, rather than a knight; in today's language, he would be the Rev'd John Deane, MA) was born in Shurlach, between Davenham and the Rudheath district of Northwich, but rose to become Rector of Great St Bartholomew in Smithfield, London, and Prebendary of Lincoln. He worked under both Protestant and Roman Catholic régimes during the English Reformation.

He established a grammar school for poor boys in Witton on Michaelmas 1557, "in the name of Jesus". It was to be maintained by feoffees (a kind of charity), who were given land in Chester and the Wirral, the result of Sir John's astuteness during the dissolution of the monasteries. As well as prescribing rules for the Feofees, Schoolmaster and schoolboys, the foundation statues record his interest in an old Cheshire custom whereby schoolboys "a weeke before Christynmas and Easter, barre and keep forth of the Schoole the schoolmaster, in such sort is other schollers doe in greete schooles." Sir John required his Grammar School to enforce the custom and allow the boys to play with bows and arrows, "to the end that the Schollars [sic] have not any evil opinion of the Schoolmaster." It was generally known as Witton Grammar School, or Witton Free Grammar School, in the early centuries. It had a close relationship with St Helen's Witton, and its early buildings were on the same site. The school had a reputation as hotbed of Puritanism in the early 17th century, and this is still perhaps its greatest contribution to public life. However, it fell into decline and became the smallest of the four ancient grammar schools of Cheshire. During the early 19th century, the feoffees and the headmaster began legal action in a dispute over the headmaster's salary, and eventually wider mismanagement. The case went to the Court of Chancery and took decades to resolve, sapping much of the school's strength.

In the early 20th century, three financial decisions radically changed the character of the school, by then generally referred to as Sir John Deane's Grammar School or Northwich Grammar School. Firstly, it received a generous 350th-anniversary benefaction from Sir John Brunner, allowing the governors to construct new buildings on its current riverside site. Secondly, the feoffees made poor investment decisions, culminating in the sale of property in Chester, that later became a high-value shopping district. Thirdly, they decided that in view of the school's long-term financial weakness, the original mandate was best fulfilled by entering the state system. The school came under the auspices of Cheshire County Council as the boys' grammar school for the Northwich area. For some time it continued to have boarders in Riversdale (an old house), which also functioned at times as the headmaster's house. This phase ended in 1977, when RoSLA and the County Council's policy of comprehensive education saw Northwich move from selective, single-sex 11–18 schools to comprehensive mixed 11–16 schools with Sir John Deane's becoming the town's sixth form college.

== Present day ==
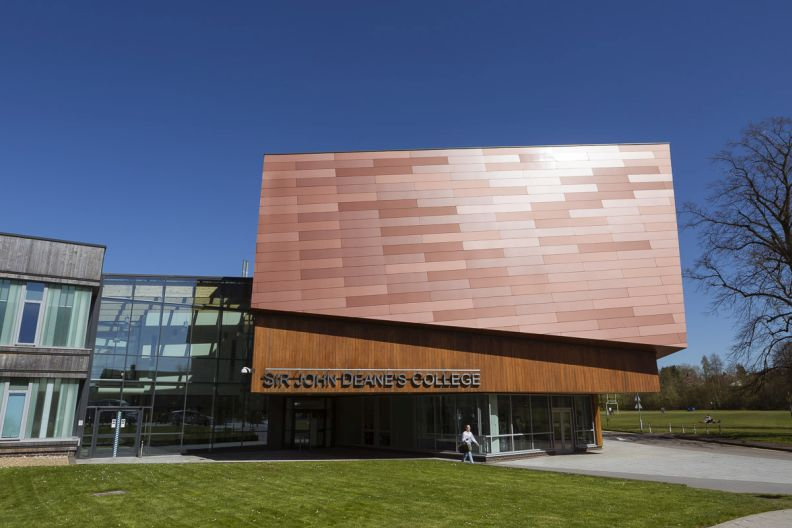
New College building completed in 2010 as part of a multi-million pound project. Architects: Broadway Malyan

Sir John Deane's College re-established itself as a voluntary controlled sixth form college in September 1978. It is a single site campus, parallel to the River Weaver; the college is around half a mile away from Northwich town centre, in the unitary authority of Cheshire West and Chester. The college provides various qualifications. The college's main aim is to provide advanced level courses for full-time students aged between 16 and 18. In 1998, the college introduced part-time adult courses.

In the last Ofsted inspection, the inspectors gave the college's quality of provision outstanding in all of the curriculum areas inspected. The inspectors also noted that the college's overall retention and pass rates are very high and are significantly above the national averages for other sixth form colleges.

The college underwent a £28 million demolition and extension programme. The new college was finished in late 2010 and fully opened in early 2011, with each department having its own area in the new building with the original building being used as a new canteen and student services.

The college also has leisure facilities, including an outdoor astroturf pitch, football and rugby pitches, tennis courts, a sports hall and a swimming pool.

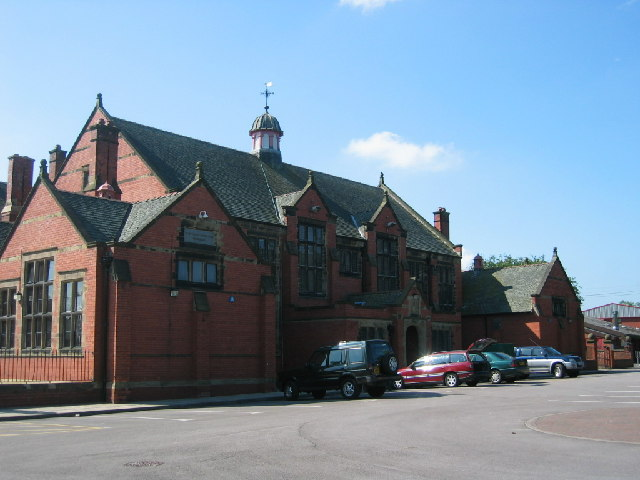
Main college building as of 2009, before the extension programme

== Old Wittonians ==
Old boys of the Grammar School are referred to as 'Old Wittonians',

- Sir John Berkenhead, Cavalier journalist, poet and politician
- Sir George Cory, 19th/20th-century chemist and historian, taught at the school some time between 1884 and 1886.
- Martin Edwards, crime novelist
- Peter Gammond, music critic, writer, poet, and artist
- John Greenway MP, 20th/21st-century Conservative politician for Ryedale
- Edwin Haslam, author
- Eaton Hodgkinson, a 19th-century engineer, had a brief and unhappy time at the school
- Philip Holland, 20th-century Conservative politician
- Charles James Hughes JP, pioneer of Association Football, co-founder of Northwich Victoria F.C., FA Cup Finals referee.
- Diana Johnson, Labour MP for Hull North
- Phil Leeson, 20th century development economist and Communist activist
- Nathan Paget, 17th-century physician and Puritan activist
- Thomas Pierson, 17th-century conformist Puritan presbyter
- Richard Steele, 17th-century Presbyterian minister and Puritan writer, buried at Great St Bartholomew's)
- James Edwin Thompson (1863-1927), surgeon and founding member of the American College of Surgeons
- Robert Westall, 20th-century children's author and longstanding Head of Art at the school, wrote a short story entitled Sir John Deane's in 2010. In 2007, the manuscript was displayed at the Weaver Hall Museum, a few minutes' walk from the College.
- Percy Young, 20th-century writer and musicologist

== See also ==
- List of English and Welsh endowed schools (19th century)
- Education in the United Kingdom
