= Christopher Cartwright =

English clergyman

Christopher Cartwright (1602–1658) was an English clergyman, known as a Hebraist and for his use of targums in Biblical exegesis, following the lead of Henry Ainsworth with John Weemes.

== Life ==
He was born in the parish of St. Michael-le-Belfry, York, in 1602. He was admitted to Peterhouse, Cambridge, on 13 December 1617. He graduated B.A. 1620, M. A. 1624; was elected to a fellowship at Peterhouse on 30 March 1625, and was afterwards a clergyman in York. Cartwright illustrated the Bible from ancient rabbinical writings, and was respectfully mentioned by contemporaries. He died at York in 1658, and left some books to the library of Peterhouse.

== Controversy with Baxter ==
When Richard Baxter wrote his first work, Aphorisms of Justification (1649), he submitted it to Cartwright among others. There were many other critics (including Anthony Burges, John Crandon, William Eyre, George Lawson, John Tombes, Thomas Tully, and John Wallis.) But Cartwright’s had an impact in the long term. Cartwright made various remarks, to which Baxter replied. Cartwright then replied by some 'exceptions.' Baxter lost the manuscript, which turned up some years after Cartwright's death. In 1676 Baxter published his Treatise of Justifying Righteousness, in two books, the second of which, entitled A Friendly Debate with the learned and worthy Mr. Christopher Cartwright, contained all the preceding papers, together with Baxter's final reply, The Substance of Mr. Cartwright's Objections considered.

== Works ==
Other writings are:

- The Magistrates' Authority in matters of Religion and the Soul's Immortality vindicated in two sermons, 1647. The first sermon, published by Edward Leigh, is directed against some soldiers in the army at York, who had roused Cartwright's indignation by denying the power of the magistrate to restrain heretics.
- The Doctrine of Faith . . . 1649 (thirty-six sermons).
- Certamen Religiosum, or a Controversy between the late King of England and the late Lord Marquesse of Worcester concerning Revelation, with a Vindication of the Protestant Cause from the pretences of the Marquesse his last Papers, which the necessity of the King's affairs denied him opportunity to answer, 1651. The Certamen Religiosum, published in 1649 by Thomas Baylie represented a debate between Charles I and Henry Somerset, 1st Marquess of Worcester, an episode of the Civil War period when Charles was staying at Raglan Castle during 1645, after the battle of Naseby. It was reprinted with Cartwright's answer.
- Electa Thargumico-Rabbinica sive Annotationes in Exodum ex triplice Thargum seu Chaldaica paraphrase ... 1658. Dedicated to James Ussher.
- Mellificium Hebraicum seu observationes diversimodae ex Hebraeorum, praesertim antiquorum, monumentis desumptse, unde plurimi cum Veteri cum Novi Testamenti loci vel explicantur vel illustrantur. This was first published in the ninth volume of the Critici Sacri, 1660, and the eighth volume of the edition of 1698. The Electa Thargumico-Rabbinica was first inserted in the Critici Sacri of 1698 (vol. i. pt. i.)
