= John Geree =

English Puritan clergyman preacher and author

John Geree (c. 1600 – February 1649) was an English Puritan clergyman preacher, and author of several tracts engaging in theological and political issues of the day, who was silenced for nonconformism but later reinstated. His elder brother Stephen Geree (1594-1665), also a Puritan minister and author, maintained his ministry through the Commonwealth and Restoration in Surrey.

== Origins and education ==
Stephen and John Geree were born in Yorkshire, and studied at Magdalen Hall, Oxford. Stephen, the elder, became a student there in 1611, aged 17, and went through the courses in Logic and Philosophy, taking B.A. in 1615. He was ordained deacon by the Bishop of Bath and Wells in March 1616, and priest by the Bishop of Llandaff in December 1623. John entered the college in 1615, aged 14, either as batler or servitor. He graduated B.A. on 27 January 1619, and took his M.A. on 12 June 1621, the same day on which John Tombes took his B.A. from the same college.

== John Geree ==
John Geree made an early appearance in print in 1625, with a dedicatory epistle to the collected lectures of William Pemble of Magdalen Hall, published after his death as Vindiciae Fidei: A Treatise of Justification by Faith. In November 1627 he was licensed as a preacher throughout the dioceses of London, Gloucester and Worcester, and as preacher and curate in Tewkesbury, Gloucestershire. In 1629 he published at Oxford A Catechisme concerning the Lord's Supper. For refusal to conform to ceremonies of the Church of England he was silenced by Godfrey Goodman, Bishop of Gloucester, and was reduced to living 'by the helps of his brethren.' However, during the later 1630s he continued to defy the suspension in Tewkesbury, and by 1641 he had an enthusiastic following there.

In 1641 he was restored to his cure by the Committee for Plundered Ministers. From this date his sermons or tracts recommence, beginning with The Down-Fall of Anti-Christ, dedicated to the Committee itself, and Judah's Joy at the Oath, a sermon celebrating the Parliamentary Covenant, but finding unsoundness in Henry Burton's interpretation of it. In the following year he preached by authority at a public fast on behalf of Ireland (a sermon printed in Dublin and London), and in 1644 published Vindiciæ Ecclesiæ Anglicanæ, a treatise showing the need for reform and the ejection of scandalous ministers, but maintaining that reformed ministry need not entail separation from the Church of England. It affirmed the principle of infant baptism.

With these credentials he was proposed, examined, and appointed to officiate the Cure of St Albans in Hertfordshire early in 1645/6, and his The Character of an Old English Puritane, or Non-Conformist appeared in 1646. The Baptist movement was very active in north-western Hertfordshire: Geree's Vindiciae Paedo-Baptismi and Vindiciae Vindiciarum (dedicated to the Mayor and Burgesses of St Albans) were directed against the arguments of his former fellow-student John Tombes (whom he calls his 'ancient friend'), and of Edward Harrison of Kensworth, who was effectively founder of the St Albans Baptists. Their belief was that the sacrament of baptism should be accorded only to those of age and understanding to be able to confess their faith. A determined opponent of Episcopacy, in 1646 he also published A Case of Conscience Resolved, to prove that the King could consent to its abolition without breaking his Coronation Oath. In another tract he condemned the practise of Judicial astrology.

He left St Albans in 1647, being appointed preacher at St Faith under St Paul's, a parish whose congregation (including many booksellers) met in a crypt within Old St Paul's Cathedral in London. His residence in February 1648 was in Ivy Lane, Paternoster Row. In London, as elsewhere, his sermons were largely attended by Puritans. He produced a fourth edition of William Fenner's The Spirituall Mans Directorie, with his own preface of recommendation, enlarged tables and notes for the illiterate. His Case of Conscience had been answered, or 'sifted', by Edward Boughen, to whom he rejoined with The Sifter's sieve broken in 1648. In the same year he introduced the publication of a tract from Thomas Shepard, formerly of Emmanuel College, Cambridge, who had emigrated to Cambridge, Massachusetts in 1635 to continue his ministry there. At the request of 'a godly Parliament-man' he preached against the drinking of healths.

A sermon preached by Geree in May 1648 On the Bloodiness of War, to persuade to peace, met with a response from certain 'left-eared orators' taking it as an aspersion upon the army, and was published in self-defence. He came into controversy with John Goodwin, declaring that the seclusion and imprisoning of certain Parliament-men by the army was defensible neither by reason nor religion, and was answered by Goodwin and Samuel Richardson. His advocacy of reform had steered a careful path away from rebellion: he died in February 1649, soon after the King's execution. It was reported by Richard Baxter that Geree was against the Parliament's war, and that 'he dyed at the news of the King's death.' The Minister who preached his funeral oration told the brethren he was poor, and made a collection for his children. Geree entrusted their education to his wife, who survived him.

== Stephen Geree ==
In September 1627, Stephen Geree was appointed a licensed preacher throughout the dioceses of London, Lincoln, Gloucester and Coventry and Lichfield. He was by then married to Margaret, their daughter being christened at St Margaret Moses in London in January 1627/8, but dying soon afterwards. In January 1628/9 a similar license was granted for the Winchester diocese, and for the parish of Wonersh, near Guildford, Surrey. There he was instituted, and subscribed, as Perpetual Vicar under the lay patronage of George Duncombe (armiger) of Albury at Christmas 1629. Over the next ten years several of his children were christened at Wonersh.

Geree was protected at Wonersh by his patron's influence, especially through Lady Elizabeth Aungier (daughter of Lord Francis Aungier of East Clandon), who by her first marriage to Simon Carryll (d. 1619), of Great Tangley Manor in Wonersh, was Duncombe's sister-in-law. Their very extensive connections, not least at Hatchlands Park, held their own position within the sphere of More (of Loseley Park) and Onslow (of Cranleigh) influence. As dowager of Tangley, Lady Elizabeth's remarriage in 1624/5 to John Machell brought affinity with his cousins Sir Nathaniel Rich and Dame Margaret Wroth, whose sister Dame Elizabeth Morgan died a parishioner at Chilworth beside Wonersh in December 1632. Lady Aungier's stepson Mathew Machell in 1635 married her daughter Elizabeth Carryll, who died of smallpox in 1639 leaving an infant son John Machell to inherit a considerable fortune which afterwards descended to the Viscounts of Irvine of Temple Newsam in Yorkshire.

In 1635 Geree, while being approved by these families, was reported to Archbishop Laud's Visitor Sir Nathaniel Brent for refusing to read a declaration making it lawful for sports to be played on Sundays. On Easter Monday 1639 he took the occasion of Elizabeth Machell's death to make, and publish, an extensive funeral sermon, The Ornament of Women, with a dedication showing his service to Lady Elizabeth, to her brother Gerard (2nd Baron of Longford) and her sister Lady Letice Holcroft. However, from late 1640 a ten-year hiatus in the Wonersh register suggests some interruption to Geree's ministry there: but in 1644 he established his orthodoxy as a reformed minister in his tract The Doctrine of the Antinomians Confuted (an answer to Tobias Crisp), and in April 1645 the parsonage and cure of the parish church of Trinity in Guildford was sequestrated to him on the ejectment of Thomas Wall as a scandalous minister.

At the same time the minister of Abinger parish was deprived as scandalous (for preaching vehemently against parliament), and in 1646 Geree, having been scrutinized by the Assembly of Divines, was put in to succeed the minister who temporarily replaced him. The advowson was customarily in the lords of the manor of Abinger, which was reunited in the possession of Richard Evelyn of Wotton in 1622, the moiety which had belonged to Sir John Morgan being sold to Evelyn by Morgan's daughter. George Evelyn (brother of John Evelyn the diarist) succeeded his father in 1641, having married a granddaughter of George Duncombe's. Duncombe died in 1647 and Lady Elizabeth Aungier in 1650, in her will releasing Geree from whatever money he owed her, and giving £5 each to him and to his son John.

Under that sustained familial patronage, Geree held Abinger for the rest of his life. His son Joseph was baptized there in 1647. He was encouraged by Thomas Hussey Sr. of Shere, Surrey, and of London, citizen and Grocer. In an action reflecting the unusual times, at a vestry meeting in 1654 Geree assigned 35 square feet of land within Abinger church to Hussey, for him to build a pew beside the pulpit, on a 1000-year lease for peppercorn rent, by unsealed and witnessed deed. Hussey was a grandson of Sir Thomas Wroth (1518-1573) and Mary Rich on his mother's side. Geree's last published work, The Golden Mean, advocating the more frequent administration of the Lord's Supper, appeared in 1656. In the following year two of his sons, John (of Abinger) and Stephen (a Silkman in Soper Lane, London), were under observation as suspected persons when they came from Calais to collect a man lately prisoner in the Upper Bench and returned to France with him.

On 26 September 1660 Geree conducted the marriage of Mr Francis Hamond to his daughter Elizabeth Geree. This occasion was chosen by E.M. Forster to exemplify the age of John Evelyn, in the fourth episode of the 1934 Abinger Pageant. In 1662 Geree conformed. On 28 January 1664/5 his wife's burial took place, and on 9 February he followed her to the churchyard. John Geree, probably his son, was licensed as curate of Shalford in February 1667/8, instituted as Vicar of Farnham in 1669 and as Rector of East Clandon in March 1675/6. He may be the John Geary who matriculated from Magdalen Hall on 9 December 1653. Stephen Geree had numerous descendants.

== Works ==
=== Works by John Geree ===
- A Catechisme in briefe questions and answers containing such things as are to be knowne or had by all such as would partake the Sacrament of the Lord's supper with comfort (Oxford: Printed by Iohn Lichfield An. Dom. 1629).
- The Down-Fall of Anti-Christ: or, the power of preaching to pull down Popery. In a briefe treatise on 2 Thessal.ii.8 (R. Oulton for J. Bartlet; London 1641).
- Judah's Joy at the Oath: layd out in a Sermon on 2 Chron. 15, 15. for England's example in embracing the Parliamentary Covenant with readiness and rejoycing, with Vindiciæ voti. Or a vindication of the true sense of the nationall covenant, in a briefe and moderate answere to the Protestation Protested : discovering the unsoundnesse of that interpretation of the covenant, and the weaknesse of the grounds there suggested for separate and independent churches. By Iohn Geree, master of arts, and preacher of Gods word in Tewkesbury. Published by the authority of the House of Commons.(R. Oulton for J. Bartlet; London 1641).
- Ireland's Advocate: or, a Sermon preached at a publicke fast held by authoritie, July the 27 in behalfe of bleeding Ireland (Dublin printed: repr. for William Bladen: London 1642).
- Vindiciæ Ecclesiæ Anglicanæ: or, ten cases resolved, which discover, that though there bee need of Reformation in, yet not of Separation from the Churches of Christ in England. Viz. The scandalous are to bee cast out. What persons are scandalous. They guilty that suffer the scandalous. The Jews had Excommunication. Separation from our churches not necessary. Separation without admonition cleers not. The fewer must yeeld to the greater number. Our churches true churches. Set formes of prayer lawfull. Baptisme of infants in Christs ordinance. (R. Cotes for Ralph Smith: London 1644).
- Vindiciæ Pædo-baptismi: or a vindication of Infant Baptism, in a full answer to Mr Tombs his Twelve Arguments alleaged against it in his Exercitation and whatsoever is rational, or material in his answer to Mr Marshals Sermon (J. Field for Christopher Meredith: London 1646).
- Astrologo-Mastix: or a discovery of the vanity and iniquity of Judiciall Astrology or divining by the starres the successe or miscarriage of humane affaires (M. Simmons, for J. Bartlet: London 1646). (Dedicated "To my very loving and beloved brother, Mr Stephen Geree, Preacher of the word at Guylford in Surrey").
- The Character of an old English Puritane, or Non-Conformist (W. Wilson, for Christopher Meredith: London 1646).
- A Case of Conscience Resolved. Wherein it is cleared that the king may without impeachment to his oath touching the clergy at coronation consent to the abrogation of Episcopacy. And the objections against it in two learned treatises, printed at Oxford, fully answered (M. Simmons for J. Bartlet: London 1646).
- Vindiciæ Vindiciarum: or a vindication of his Vindication of Infant-baptisme: from the exceptions of M. Harrison, in his Paedo-Baptisme Oppugned, and from the exceptions of M. Tombes, in his chief Digressions of his late Apology (A.M. for Christopher Meredith, London 1647).
- Σινιοῤῥαγία. The Sifter's Sieve Broken, or a reply to Doctor Boughen's sifting my Case of Conscience touching the king's coronation oath: wherein is cleared that bishops are not jure divino (London: printed for Christopher Meredith, 1648).
- Θειοφάρμακον. A Divine Potion to preserve spirituall health, by the cure of unnaturall health-drinking: Written for the satisfaction, and published by the direction, of a godly Parliament-Man (G. Latham: London 1648).
- Ἵππος Πυῤῥός, the Red Horse. Or the Bloodines of War: represented in a sermon (to perswade to peace) preached at Pauls, July 16. 1648, at five of the clocke in the afternoone. By Jo: Geree, M.A. and pastor of St Faiths under Pauls. And now published to cleare the preacher from malignancy imputed to him by some left-eared auditors. (Printed for George Latham, and are to be sold at his shop at the signe of the Bishops-head in St. Pauls Church-yard, 1648).
- Truth's right-side turned upwards, or, Armies vindication against an aspersion of rebellion and tyrannie cast upon them, in several books, whereof one subscribed by divers ministers in the province of London, another by Mr Geree: not onely cleering the case of the armie to be just, but retorting the force of the arguments of their opposers upon themselves (Printed by James and Joseph Moxon, for William Larnar, London 1649). (Dedicated to Thomas, Lord Fairfax and his General Councel of Officers.)
- Kαταδυνάστης: Might overcoming Right: or, a clear Answer to M. J. Goodwin's "Might and Right well met", Wherein is cleared, that the action of the Army in secluding many Parliament men from the place of their discharge of trust, and the imprisoning of some of them, is neither defensible by the rules of solid reason, nor religion (R. Bostock, London 1649).

=== Works by Stephen Geree ===
- The ornament of women. Or, A description of the true excellency of women: Delivered in a sermon at the funerall of M. Elizabeth Machell, on Easter Munday being the 15. of April 1639. By Stephen Geree, minister of Gods Word at Wonnersh, neare Guildford in Surrey. (Printed by T. B[adger] for L. F[awne] and S. G[ellibrand] and are to be sold at the signe of the Brazen Serpent, in Pauls Church-Yard, London 1639).
- The doctrine of the Antinomians by evidence of Gods truth, plainely confuted : In an answer to divers dangerous doctrines, in the seven first sermons of Dr. Crisps fourteen, which were first published. And are here declared to be as well anti-evangelicall as Antinomicall, absolutely overthrowing the Gospel of Jesus Christ, and perverting the free-grace of God. By Stephen Geree, minister of Gods Word at Wonnersh neare Guilford in Surrey. (Printed by R.C. for H. Blunden, at the Castle in Corn-hill, London 1644).
- The golden mean: being some serious considerations, together with some cases of conscience resolved; for a more full, and frequent administration of, yet not free admission unto, the sacrament of the Lord's Supper. By Stephen Geree, minister of God's word, and pastor of the Church of Abinger in the county of Surrey (Printed for Joseph Cranford, and are to be sold at the Kings head in St Pauls Church Yard, London 1656).
