= John Goodwin (preacher) =

English preacher, theologian and prolific author

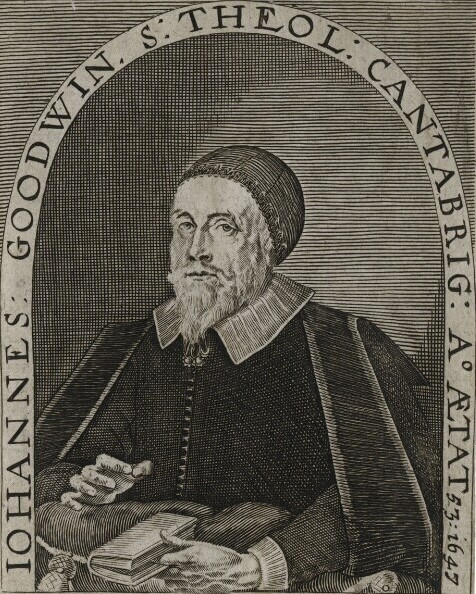
- Born: 1594
- Died: 1665 (aged 70–71)
- Occupation: Theologian, pamphleteer, Minister, Protestant Reformers

John Goodwin (1594–1665) was an English preacher, Puritan theologian and prolific author of significant books.

== Early life ==
Goodwin was born in Norfolk and educated at Queens' College, Cambridge, where he graduated M.A. and obtained a fellowship on 10 November 1617. He left the university and married, took orders and was a popular preacher in his home county and later in London. In 1622 he was the incumbent at East Raynham where he benefited from a bequest by Anne Townshend. For a time he seems to have officiated at St. Mary's, Dover. In 1632 he came to London, and on 18 December 1633 was instituted to the vicarage of St. Stephen's, Coleman Street, vacated by the nonconformist secession of John Davenport. He himself sided with the puritans, and at that period inclined to independency under the influence of John Cotton.

In 1635 he was convened for breach of canons, but on his promise of amendment Bishop William Juxon took no further proceedings. In 1638 Goodwin broached from the pulpit of St. Stephen's his opinions on justification by faith, taking a view which was already regarded as practically Arminian; he always cited Calvin as bearing him out on some points. A pulpit controversy with other city ministers on this topic was calmed by Juxon, all parties agreeing to desist. Next year (1639) Goodwin angered his opponents anew by insisting on the need of a learned ministry. Juxon reported to William Laud that he did not despair of a good issue. Goodwin had a hand in drafting the London clerical petition against the new canons of 30 June 1640. Alderman Isaac Pennington was one of his parishioners, and joined his congregational society.

In 1639 Goodwin wrote a preface to the posthumous sermons of Henry Ramsden. During the next two years he published several sermons, and a tract (1641) criticising the positions of George Walker, of St. John's, Watling Street. Walker retorted upon Goodwin and others with a charge of Socinianism in the article of justification.

== Civil War period ==
Goodwin was one of the earliest clerical supporters of the democratic puritans, and then of the army against the Parliament. His Anti-Cavalierisme (1642) proclaims the need of war to suppress the party 'now hammering England to make an Ireland of it.' The doctrine of the divine right of kings he assailed in his Os Ossorianum, or a Bone for a Bishop, against Griffith Williams, bishop of Ossory. He also attacked the presbyterians as a persecuting party in his Θεομαχία, or the grand imprudence of ... fighting against God (1644). In May 1645 he was ejected from his living for refusing to administer indiscriminately in his parish the baptism and the Lord's Supper, setting up a covenanted community within his parish. Goodwin immediately set up an independent church in Coleman Street, which had a large following. William Taylor, his appointed successor at St. Stephen's, was in his turn ejected in 1649, to be restored in 1657. Goodwin obtained the use of the church, but with a diminished revenue. Among his hearers at this period was Thomas Firmin, who took down his sermons in shorthand.

The Gangraena (1646) of Thomas Edwards included Goodwin among the subjects of attack; in the second and third parts, published in the same year, Edwards was provoked into savage onslaughts by Goodwin's anonymous reply Cretensis. Goodwin is 'a monstrous sectary, a compound of Socinianism, Arminianism, antinomianism, independency, popery, yea and of scepticism.' He and several of his church 'go to bowls and other sports on days of public thanksgiving.' Cretensis also defended Jeremiah Burroughs and William Greenhill whom Goodwin knew, and also Robert Cosens and John Ellis where the connection was prompted by Edwards (who hit back at them all bracketed together). Goodwin, by his Hagiomastix, or the Scourge of the Saints (1647) came into collision with William Jenkyn, vicar of Christ Church, Newgate, whose Testimony was endorsed (14 December 1647) by fifty-eight presbyterian divines at Sion College. Sixteen members of Goodwin's church issued an Apologetical Account (1647) of their reasons for standing by him.

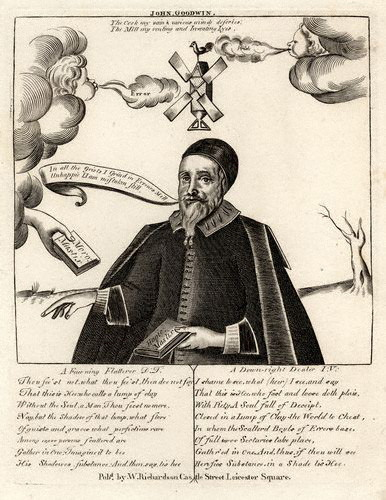
John Goodwin, satirical engraving (18th century).

Jenkyn was aided by John Vicars, usher in Christ Church Hospital, who published (1648) an amusing description of 'Coleman-street-conclave' and its minister, 'this most huge Garagantua,' the 'schismatics cheater in chief.' This contains a likeness of Goodwin (engraved by William Richardson) surmounted by a windmill and weathercock, 'pride' and 'error' supplying the breeze.

Goodwin translated and printed a part of the Stratagemata Satanae (March 1648) of Acontius under the title Satan's Stratagems; or the Devil's Cabinet-Councel discovered, with recommendatory epistles by himself and John Durie. Acontius, an advocate of religious tolerance, was now stigmatised by Francis Cheynell as a 'sneaking Socinian'. Cheynell sought in vain in the Westminster Assembly to obtain a condemnation of Goodwin's book, but printed (1650) his thoughts about it by request. The translation was reissued with a new title, Darkness Discovered; or the Devil's secret Stratagems laid open (1651).

Goodwin defended the most extreme measures of the army leaders. In his Might and Right Well Met (1648), which was answered by John Geree, he applauded Pride's Purge. He was one of the puritan divines who, in the interval between the sentence and execution of the king, offered him their spiritual services. Goodwin mentions in his Ὑβριστοδίκαι. The Obstrvctovrs of Justice (30 May 1649), that he had an hour's conversation or more with Charles, but was not impressed by his visit. He firmly contended in the same tract for the sovereign rights of the people, quoted approvingly John Milton's Tenure of Kings and Magistrates (13 February 1649), and maintained that the proceedings against Charles followed the spirit of the law if not the letter. Two Hymns or Spiritual Songs (1651) were sung in his congregation on 24 October 1651, the thanksgiving day for the victory at the Battle of Worcester.

Meanwhile, Goodwin pursued theological controversies. His defense of general redemption, Ἀπολύτρωσις ἀπολύτρωσεως, or Redemption Redeemed, appeared in 1651 (reprinted 1840); his Water-Dipping no Firm Footing (1653) and Cata-Baptism (1655) were polemics against Baptists. The circumstance that Oliver Cromwell's 'Triers' were mostly independents did not reconcile him to the new ecclesiastical despotism; he arraigned it in his Bασανισταί. Or the Triers [or Tormenters] Tried (1657).

Goodwin speaks of himself as having to contend in a manner with the whole earth' (dedication to Cata-Baptism). His ideas were often anticipations. His rational temper made him the opponent of Seekers and Quakers, and gave him some affinity with the Cambridge Platonists. He rejected the distinction allowed by Acontius, between tolerance of error in fundamentals and in other points. He would have men 'call more for light and less for fire from heaven' (epistle in Satan's Stratagems, 1648). In his Divine Authority of the Scriptures Asserted (1648), which won the commendation of Richard Baxter, he maintains, anticipating George Fox and Robert Barclay, that the word of God 'was extant in the world, nay in the hearts and consciences of men, before there was any copy of the word extant in writing.' In his Pagans Debt and Dowry (1651; 1671, a reply to Thomas Barlow), which led to a controversy with Obadiah Howe, he argues that without the letter of the gospel heathens may be saved.

Goodwin was also a believer in the future calling of the Jews and was a millenarian. His views are expressed in A Post-Script or Appendix to [. . .] Hagiomastix (1647). A member of Goodwin's gathered congregation, Daniel Taylor, later petitioned Oliver Cromwell for the readmission of the Jews to England in a treatise entitled Certain Queries (1651).

== After the Restoration ==
At the Restoration Goodwin, with John Milton, was ordered into custody on 16 June 1660. He kept out of the way, and at length was placed in the indemnity, among eighteen persons perpetually incapacitated for any public trust. His Ὑβριστοδίκαι was burned (27 August) by the hangman at the Old Bailey. According to Gilbert Burnet, his comparative immunity was due to his Arminian reputation.

He soon returned to his Coleman Street congregation, though not to the emoluments of St. Stephen's, of which he was deprived and Theophilus Alford admitted as his successor, on 29 May 1661. He had written strenuously against the Fifth-monarchy men in 1654 and 1655; but Thomas Venner's meeting house, from which Venner's Rising proceeded, was in Swan Alley, Coleman Street, and here also, in 1653, was Goodwin's study. This may explain why Burnet wrote that Goodwin was one of these enthusiasts. Immediately on Venner's rising, Goodwin's church issued a Declaration (January 1661) disclaiming all sympathy with this or any attempt 'to propagate religion by the sword.'

Goodwin was named as one of the men who was excluded from holding any state office in the Indemnity and Oblivion Act 1660. He died in the plague year, 1665. By his early marriage he had seven children, two of whom died in 1645.

== Works ==
Goodwin published (besides works already mentioned):

- The Saints' Interest in God, 1640.
- God a Good Master, 1641 (dedicated to Elizabeth Hampden, mother of John Hampden).
- The Return of Mercies, 1641.
- The Christian's Engagement, 1641.
- Impedit ira animum, or Animadversions vpon . . . George Walker, 1641, (Walker's Defence, to which this is a reply, was published by Goodwin).
- Impvtatio Fidei, or a Treatise on Justification, 1642. Later edited by John Wesley to combat Calvinist antinomianism.
- The Butcher's Blessing, or the Bloody Intentions of Romish Cavaliers, 1642 (Jackson).
- Innocencies Triumph, or an Answer to ... William Prynne, &c., 1644, (two editions same year, defends his 'Θεομαχία'). Innocency and Truth Triumphing, 1645, (continuation). Calumny Arraign'd, 1645, (answer to Prynne's reply).
- A Vindication of Free Grace, 1645, (ed. by Samuel Lane, contains sermon 28 April 1644 by Goodwin, taken in shorthand by Thomas Rudyard).
- Twelve . . . Serious Cautions, 1646.
- Some Modest and Humble Queries, 1646 (Jackson).
- Anapologesia Tes Antapologias, or The Inexcusablenesse of ... Antapologia, 1646 (first and only part; against Thomas Edwards).
- A Candle to see the Sunne, 1647, (appendix to Hagiomastix). A Postscript ... to ... Hagiomastix, 1647.
- Sion College Visited, or Animadversions on a Pamphlet of W. Jenkyns, 1647 (i.e. January 1648).
- Nεοφυτοπρεβύτερος, or The Youngling Elder ... for the instruction of W. Jenkyn, 1648.
- The Unrighteous Judge, 1648 (i.e. 18 January 1649), reply to Sir Francis Nethersole.
- Truth's Conflict with Error, 1650, from shorthand report by John Weeks of disputations on universal redemption by Goodwin against Vavasor Powell, and John Simpson.
- The Remedy of Unreasonableness, 1650 (Jackson).
- Goodwin, John (1651). Redemption Redeemed.
- Moses made Angry; a Letter ... to Dr. Hill, 1651 (Jackson).
- Confidence Dismounted, or a Letter to Mr. Richard Resbury, 1651 (Jackson).
- Εἰρηνομαχία, The Agreement and Distance of Brethren, 1652; 1671.
- A Paraphrase, 1652; second edition with title An Exposition of the Ninth Chapter of the Epistle to the Romans, 1653 (dedicated to the Lord Mayor, John Fowke).
- Philadelphia, or XL Queries, 1653, (on baptism).
- Thirty Queries, 1653 (Jackson; on the magistrate's authority in religion). The Apologist Condemned, 1653 (Jackson, a vindication of this work).
- Dissatisfaction Satisfied in Seventeen . . . Queries, 1654 (Jackson). Peace Protected, 1654, (amplification; contains a warning against the "fift monarchic" men).
- A Fresh Discovery of the High Presbyterian Spirit, 1654, (controversy with six London booksellers, Thomas Underhill, Samuel Gellibrand, John Rothwell, Luke Fawne, Joshua Kirton, and Nathaniel Webb, who petitioned for the restraint of the press). The Six Booksellers Proctor Non-suited, 1655.
- Mercy in her Exaltation, 1655, (funeral sermon, 20 April, for Daniel Taylor).
- The Foot out of the Snare, 1656 (by John Toldervy, who had been a quaker; part by Goodwin).
- Triumviri, or the Genius ... of ... Richard Resbury, John Pawson, and George Kendall, 1658.
- Πλήρωμα τὰ Πνευματικόν, or a Being Filled with the Spirit, posthumous 1670, with recommendatory epistle by Ralph Venning; it is included in James Nichol's Series of Standard Divines.

Goodwin edited William Fenner's Divine Message, 1645.

== Notes and references ==
=== Sources ===
- English statute (1660). An act of free and general pardon, indemnity and oblivion, chap. XLIII – via Wikisource.
- Gordon, Alexander (1890). "Goodwin, John" . In Stephen, Leslie; Lee, Sidney (eds.). Dictionary of National Biography. Vol. 22. London: Smith, Elder & Co.
- Hughes, Ann (2004). Gangraena and the Struggle for the English Revolution. Oxford: Oxford University Press.
- Mahlberg, Gaby (2019). "Townshend, Anne, Lady Townshend (1573–1622)". Oxford Dictionary of National Biography (online ed.). Oxford University Press. doi:10.1093/ref:odnb/66940. (Subscription, Wikipedia Library access or UK public library membership required.)
- More, Ellen (1982). "John Goodwin and the Origins of the New Arminianism". Journal of British Studies. 22 (1). Cambridge University Press: 50–70. doi:10.1086/385797. JSTOR 175656.
- Rabone, Lawrence (2020). "John Goodwin on Zechariah 13:3: Toleration, Supersessionism and Judaeo-Centric Eschatology". Bulletin of the John Rylands Library. 96 (2): 47–68. doi:10.7227/BJRL.96.2.3. S2CID 230670355.
- University of Cambridge (2019). "Goodwin, John (GDWN612J)". A Cambridge Alumni Database.
