= William Fenner (disambiguation) =

William Fenner may refer to:

- William Fenner (1600-1640), English Puritan divine
- Bill Fenner (footballer) (1889-1950), English footballer, see List of Bury F.C. players (25–99 appearances)

== See also ==
- Bill Fenner, author, see tcpdump
