= John Fuller Russell =

Church of England cleric and writer

John Fuller Russell (1813–1884), was a priest in the Church of England, a writer, mostly on theological subjects, especially religious ritual, and a notable art collector. He was a member of the committee of the Ecclesiological Society and had close connections to the High Church Oxford Movement.

== Life ==
Russell was born on 15 August 1813, the son of Thomas Russell, a Congregationalist minister, whose surname was originally Cloutt. Arthur Tozer Russell was his brother. He was educated at Peterhouse, Cambridge, where he read civil law. He became one of the first sympathisers with the Oxford Movement at Cambridge, and in 1836, while still an undergraduate at Peterhouse, he began a correspondence with Edward Bouverie Pusey, in which he expressed a desire to revive much of the disused ritual of the Church. In 1837 he visited Pusey at Christ Church.

In 1838 he was ordained deacon and appointed to the curacy of St. Peter's, Walworth. The next year he graduated LL.B., and was admitted to priest's orders. He held the perpetual curacy of St James, Enfield Highway, from 1841 to 1854. On 2 October 1843 he married Rosalie Croshaw at the church. In 1856 he became rector of Greenhithe, Kent.

He was a member of the council of the Society of Antiquaries, of the central committee of the Royal Archæological Institute, and of the committee of the Ecclesiological Society.

== Art collection ==
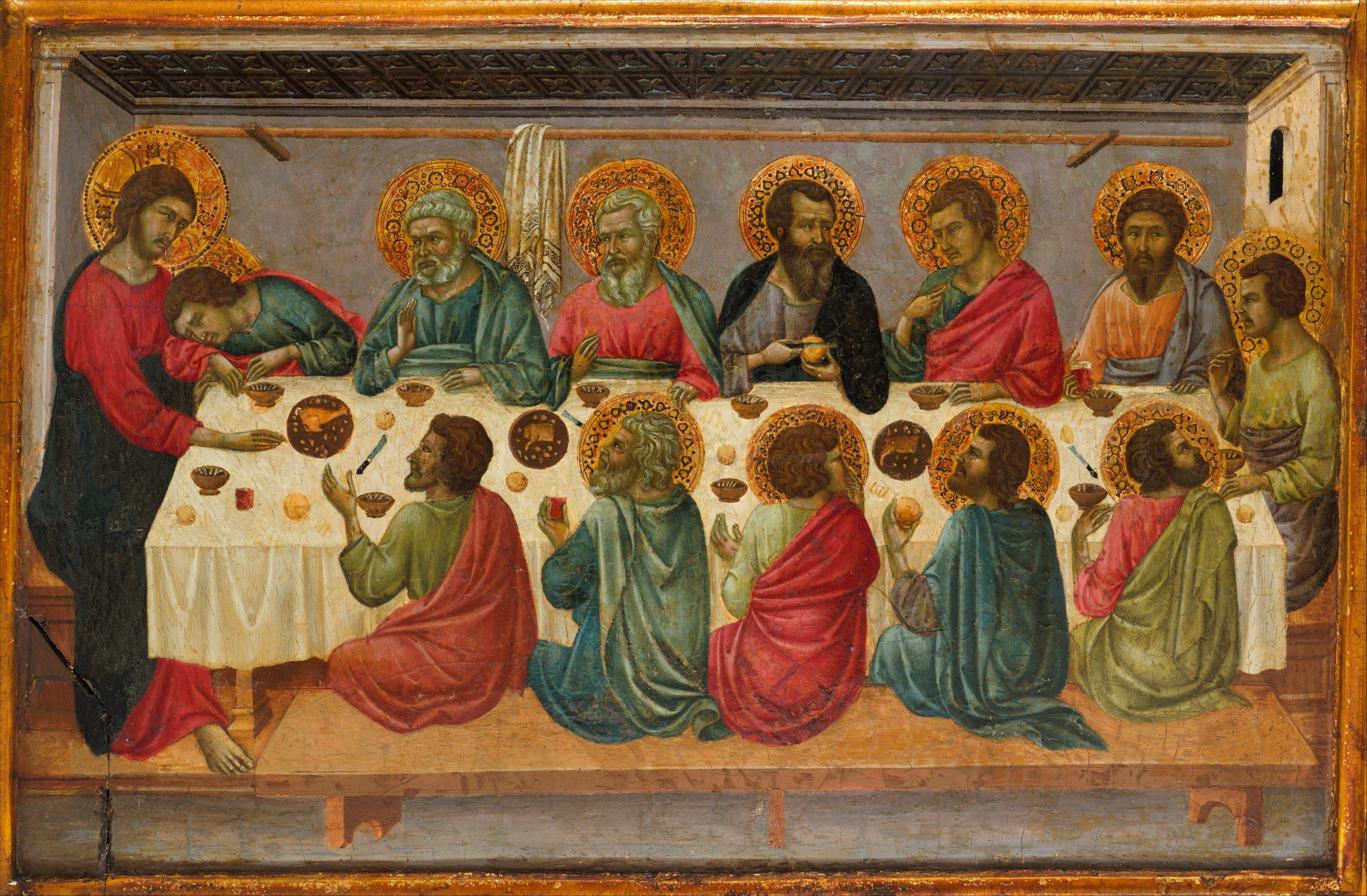
Ugolino da Siena's Last Supper (Metropolitan Museum, New York), once owned by Russell

When the German art historian Gustav Waagen visited Russell at Eagle House near Enfield, he found the walls "so richly adorned with specimens of the 14th century, that the spectator feels as if transported to a chapel at Siena or Florence." He described Russell as "one of the most enthusiastic admirers of the grandeur and high significance of the ecclesiastic art from the 13th to the 15th century that I met with in England".

His collection included the "Diptych of Jeanne of France" (now in the collection of the Musée Condé in Chantilly), believed in his lifetime to be by Hans Memling six of the seven panels from the predella of Ugolino da Siena's altarpiece for Santa Croce in Florence, bought from the sale of the William Young Ottley collection, Abrecht Altdorfer's Christ taking Leave of His Mother (National Gallery, London) and Simone Martini's St Geminianus, St Michael and St Augustine, each with an Angel above (Fitzwilliam Museum, Cambridge)

He also had a notable collection of illuminated manuscripts and early printed books.

== Death ==
He died on 6 April 1884 at his house in Ormonde Terrace, Regent's Park, London. His paintings were sold at Christie's, on 18 April 1885.

== Works ==
Russell's works relate mainly to the doctrine and discipline of the church of England. They include:

- Letter to the Right Hon. H. Goulburn on the Morals and Religion of the University of Cambridge. (1833).
- The Exclusive Power of an episcopally ordained Clergy to administer the Sacraments (1834)
- The Judgment of the Anglican Church (posterior to the Reformation) on the Sufficiency of Holy Scripture, and the Authority of the Holy Catholic Church in Matters of Faith (1838)
- Strict Observance of the Rubric recommended (1839)
- A few hints on the practical study of Ecclesiastical antiquities for the use of the Cambridge Camden Society (with J.M. Neale; third edition 1842)
- Anglican ordinations valid : a refutation of certain statements in the second and third chapters of 'The validity of Anglican ordinations examined'. By the Very Reverend Peter Richard Kenrick, V.G. (1846)
- The Life of Dr. Samuel Johnson (1847)
- The Ancient Knight, or Chapters on Chivalry (1849)
- Oral and Written Evidence in regard to the post-Reformation symbolical Use of Lights in the Church of England in the second report of the Ritual Commission (1867).

He was co-editor with Walter Farquhar Hook of the Voice of the Church (2 vols. 1840), and with William Josiah Irons of Tracts of the Anglican Fathers (1841). He was also editor of Hierurgia Anglicana, or Documents and Extracts illustrative of the Church of England after the Reformation (1848).

== Sources ==
Attribution

This article incorporates text from a publication now in the public domain: "Russell, John Fuller". Dictionary of National Biography. London: Smith, Elder & Co. 1885–1900.
