= William Orme =

William Orme may refer to:

- William W. Orme (1832–1866), United States Army general
- William Orme (minister) (1787–1830), Scottish Congregational minister
