= Boughen =

Boughen is a surname. Notable people with the surname include:

- Edward Boughen (1587–1660?), English royalist divine
- Ray Boughen (1937–2022), Canadian politician

== See also ==
- Boughey
