= Boushey =

Boushey is a surname. Notable people with the surname include:

- David L. Boushey (born 1942), American stuntman, stunt coordinator, stage fight director, and stunt trainer
- Heather Boushey (born 1970), American economist

== See also ==
- Boughey
