= Thomas Russell (minister) =

English independent minister

Thomas Russell, originally Thomas Cloutt (1781–1846) was an English independent minister, known for editions of theological works.

== Life ==
He was born at Marden, Kent, on 5 November 1781. His father and grandfather were members of the Church of England, and he was confirmed as an Anglican; but was trained for the dissenting ministry at Hoxton Academy (September 1800–June 1803), under Robert Simpson, D.D. His first settlement was at Tonbridge, Kent, in 1803.

In 1806 he became minister of Pell Street Chapel, Ratcliff Highway, where he was ordained on 5 September; but his ministry was not popular. About 1820 he adopted his mother's maiden name of Russell, and in 1823 obtained the king's patent for the change. Soon afterwards he received from a Scottish university the diploma of M.A. On the closure of Pell Street Chapel a few years before his death, he became minister of Baker Street Chapel, Enfield, Middlesex.

He was a Coward trustee and, from 1842, a trustee of the foundations of Daniel Williams; he was also secretary of the Aged Ministers' Relief Society. Contrary to the general sentiment of congregationalists, he was a promoter of the Dissenters' Chapels Act 1844. He died at his residence, Penton Row, Walworth, Surrey, on 10 December 1846. Arthur Tozer Russell and John Fuller Russell were his sons.

== Works ==
His tastes were literary, and he edited a collection of hymns as an appendix to Isaac Watts. Under the name of Cloutt he published four sermons (1806–18), and the Collection of Hymns, (1813). His Jubilee Sermon (1809) was roughly handled in the Anti-Jacobin Review, November 1809, and he issued a defensive "Appendix", giving some autobiographical details.

In 1823 he began his edition of the works of John Owen, finishing it in 1826 in twenty octavo volumes, uniform with the Life of Owen (1820), by William Orme; sets were completed by prefixing this Life, and adding the seven volumes of Owen on Hebrews (Edinburgh, 1812–14), edited by James Wright. Russell's edition was superseded by that of William Henry Goold, D.D. In 1828 he issued proposals for a series of The Works of the English and Scottish Reformers; of this three volumes (1829–31) were published, containing works of William Tyndale and John Frith.
