= Benjamin Agus =

English nonconformist (fl. 1662)

Benjamin Agus (fl. 1662) was an Anglican priest. He was one of the most distinguished early vindicators of the Nonconformists with Richard Baxter and Vincent Alsop.

He was a native of Wymondham, Norfolk. He entered Corpus Christi College, Cambridge, in 1639 and then proceeded M.A in 1657. In his will, it is said that on 21 May 1683 he was ejected from Chenies, Buckinghamshire.

== Career ==
Benjamin's works included Vindication of Nonconformity and the Antidote to Dr. Stillingfleet's Unreasonableness of Separation; being a defense of the former.
