= Thomas Bailey (priest) =

English religious controversialist

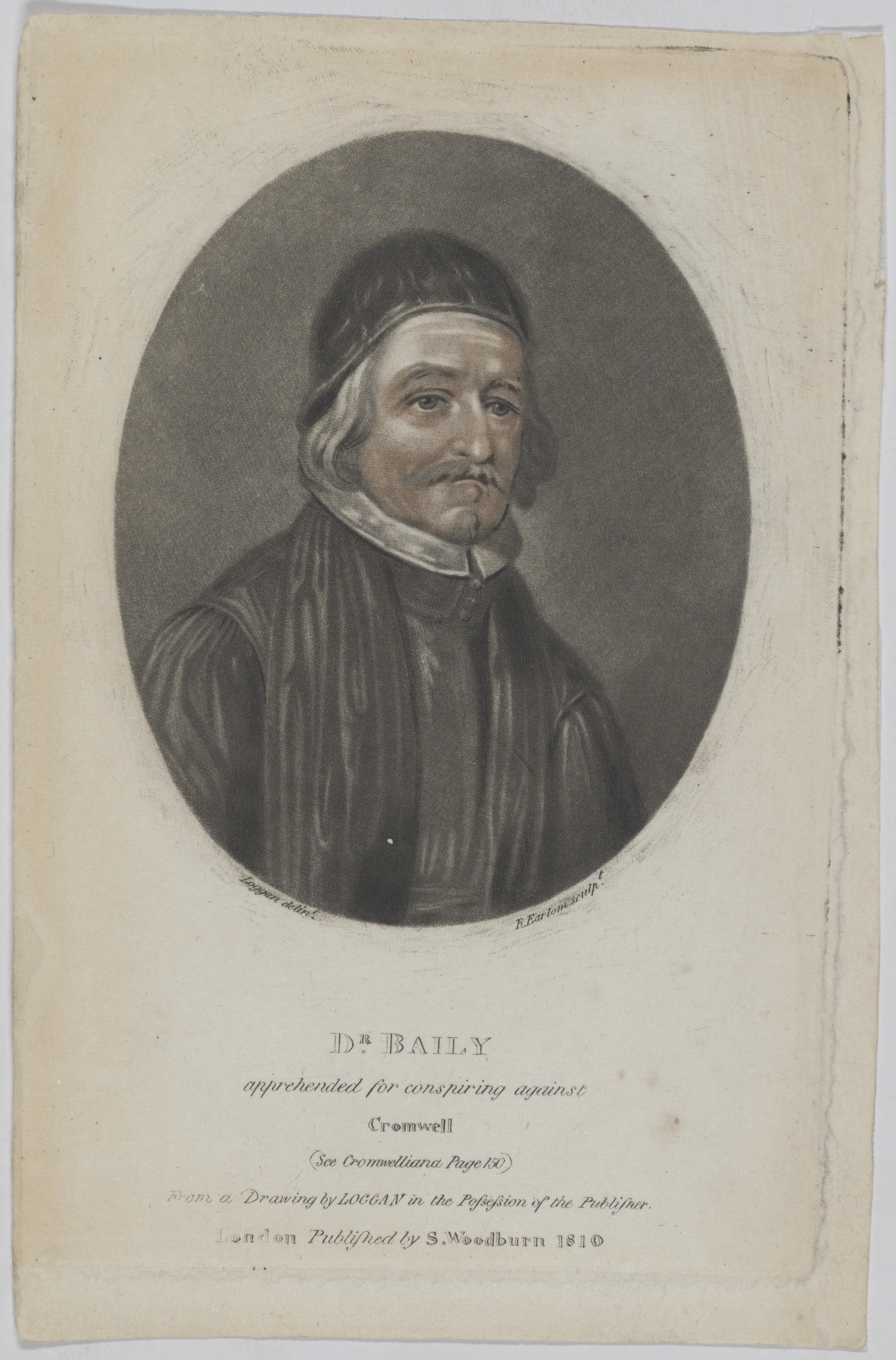
Portrait of Thomas Bailey by David Loggan

Thomas Bailey or Bayly (died c. 1657) was a seventeenth-century English religious controversialist, a Royalist Church of England clergyman who converted to Catholicism.

== Biography ==
Bailey's father was Lewis Bayly, Bishop of Bangor, and a brother was the scholar and clergyman John Bayly (1595/6–1633). Bailey was educated at Magdalene College, Cambridge. He began as a priest within his father's diocese; in 1634 he became Rector of Holgate, Shropshire, and in 1638 the sub-dean of Wells. He served as a commissioned officer in defence of Raglan Castle in 1646, and was briefly imprisoned in Newgate gaol for writing against the Commonwealth after Charles I was executed in 1649.

In that year he also defended Charles against allegations that he had been a Catholic. In Certamen Religiosum he reported on religious discussions from 1646 between Charles and Henry Somerset, 1st Marquess of Worcester, at Raglan Castle. Bailey attended the Marquess, as his chaplain. The work proved controversial, and was attacked by Hamon L'Estrange, Christopher Cartwright, and Peter Heylyn.

However, Bailey then made his way to Europe, and had himself converted to Catholicism by the time of his 1654 End to Controversy. A Life of John Fisher was issued under Bailey's name in 1655, though it was in fact a re-publication of a much earlier text which Richard Hall (died 1604) had translated into Latin.

== Works ==
- The royal charter granted unto kings, by God himself, 1649
- Certamen religiosum, 1649
- An End to Controversy between the Roman Catholique and the Protestant Religions Justified, 1654
