= Boughey =

Boughey is a surname. Notable people with the surname include:

- Darren Boughey (born 1970), English footballer
- Joseph Boughey (1873–1935), English footballer
- Peter Boughey (1911–1986), British Army officer
- Robert Boughey (born 1936), American architect
- Stanley Boughey (1896–1917), British Army officer
- Boughey baronets

== See also ==
- Boughen
