= Samuel Shaw (minister) =

English nonconformist minister (1635-1696)

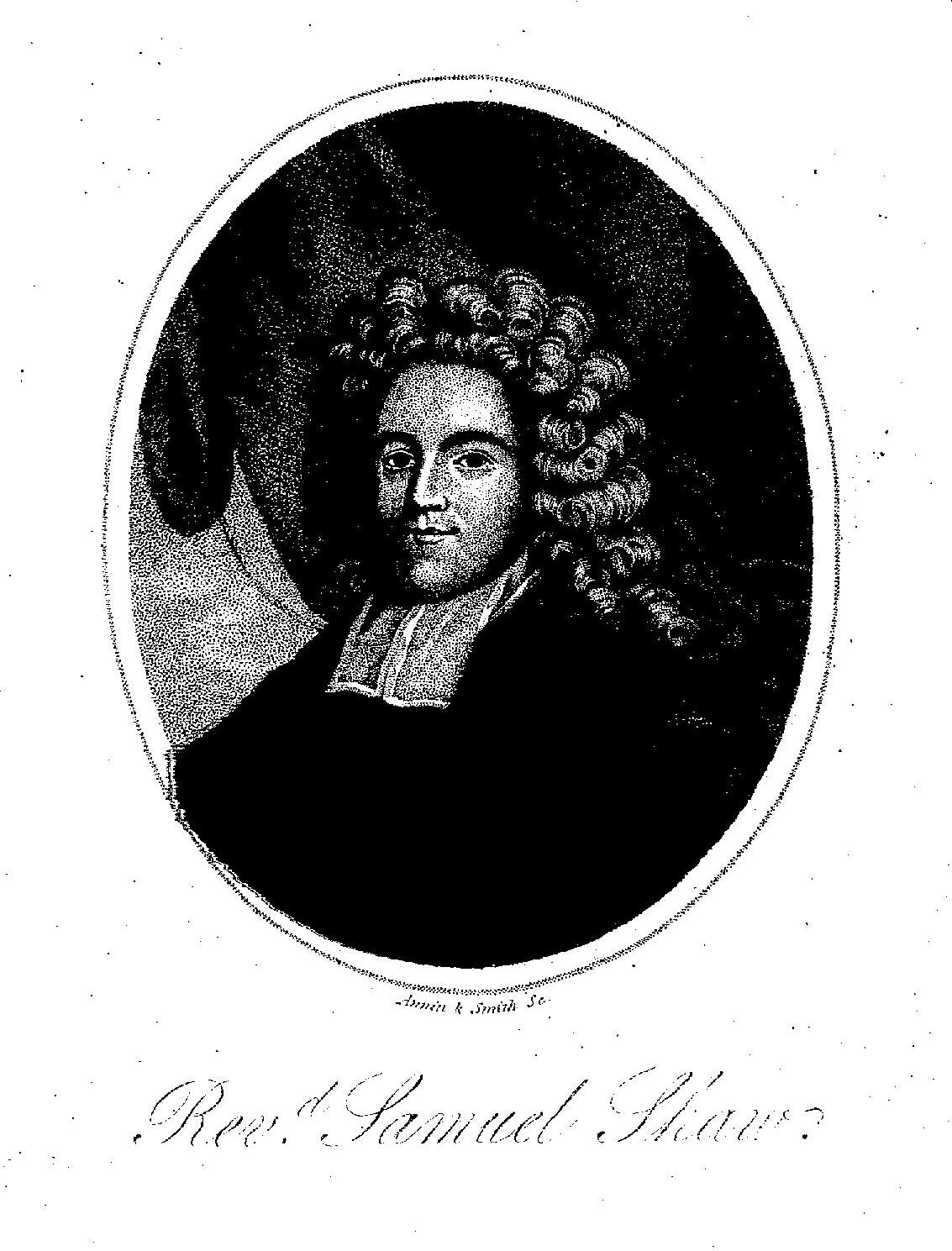
Rev. Samuel Shaw

Samuel Shaw (1635–1696) was an English nonconformist minister.

== Life ==
The son of Thomas Shaw, blacksmith, he was born at Repton, Derbyshire, in 1635. From Repton Grammar School he went to St John's College, Cambridge, where he was admitted sizar, 23 December 1650, and graduated B.A.

In 1656 he was appointed master of the grammar school at Tamworth, Warwickshire. Before 15 September 1657 he was called to be curate of the chapelry of Moseley, under John Hall, vicar of Bromsgrove, Worcestershire, brother of Thomas Hall. There being no classis in Worcestershire, he was ordained by the presbyterian classis of Wirksworth, Derbyshire, on 12 January 1658. Some months later he was presented by Oliver Cromwell to the sequestered rectory of Long Whatton, Leicestershire (a crown living). His approbation and admission by the Triers are dated 28 May 1658, and he took possession on 5 June. The sequestered rector was Henry Robinson, a half-cousin of William Laud and his death enabled Shaw to obtain a crown presentation under the great seal (1 September 1660), with the act of the Convention parliament passed in the same month making good his title without institution.

Next year, however, Shaw was removed (1661) from his living at the instance of Sir John Pretyman; he obtained no other benefice, and then the Uniformity Act 1662 disqualified him, as he refused to submit to re-ordination. He removed to Coates, in the parish of Prestwould, Leicestershire. Some relatives brought the bubonic plague there from London in 1665, and Shaw lost two children. At the end of 1666 he moved to Ashby-de-la-Zouch, Leicestershire, and was appointed master of the grammar school there in 1668. Through Edward Conway, Earl of Conway, he obtained a licence (26 December 1670) from Archbishop Gilbert Sheldon, on a modified subscription (to the first, third, and first half of the second article, specified in the thirty-sixth canon of the Thirty Nine Articles). William Fuller, bishop of Lincoln, who admired Shaw's book on the plague, added his own licence, on a subscription ‘dictated and inserted’ by Shaw himself. Thomas Barlow, who succeeded Fuller as bishop of Lincoln, was his correspondent.

Shaw's school was successful, and his house was full of boarders, including several who became divines in the Church of England. He wrote comedies for his scholars, ‘which they acted for the entertainment of the town and neighbourhood at Christmas time.’ He rebuilt the schoolhouse, and erected a gallery in the parish church for his scholars. On the passing of the Toleration Act 1688, he licensed his schoolhouse for nonconformist worship, preaching only between church hours (at noon), and attending the parish church with his scholars.

Shaw was noted for extempore prayer, lasting two or three hours. He died on 22 January 1696.

== Works ==
His first publication was a funeral oration (1657) for Thomas Blake, vicar of Tamworth.

He published, besides sermons:

- ‘The Voice of One crying in the Wilderness,’ 1666; 1674, (includes ‘A Welcome to the Plague’ and two other pieces).
- ‘Immanuel,’ 1667; 4th edit. Leeds, 1804 (with memoir from Calamy).
- ‘The Great Commandment … annex'd the Spiritual Man in a Carnal Fit,’ 1679.
- ‘Words made Visible, or Grammar and Rhetoric,’ a comedy, 1679.
- ‘The True Christian's Test,’ 1682 (consists of 149 meditations in two parts).
- ‘Grammatica Anglo-Romana,’ 1687.
- ‘Ποικιλοφρόνησις: or, The Different Humours of Men represented at an Interlude in a Country School,’ 1692.
- ‘An Epitome of the Latin Grammar,’ 1693 (Calamy).

His farewell sermon at Long Whatton is the eighth in ‘England's Remembrancer,’ 1663.

== Family ==
He married a daughter of Ferdinando Pool (died 1676), ejected from Thrumpton, Nottinghamshire. Their son, Ferdinando Shaw, M.A., was ordained 14 April 1698, became minister of Friar Gate chapel, Derby, on 25 March 1699, published several sermons, as well as ‘A Summary of the Bible,’ 1730, 12mo, and died in 1744. Ferdinando’s son, Samuel Shaw the younger, was also a minister; his own daughter, Jane Shaw, married the grandson of Oliver Heywood.

== Notes ==
Attribution

This article incorporates text from a publication now in the public domain: "Shaw, Samuel". Dictionary of National Biography. London: Smith, Elder & Co. 1885–1900.
