= Thomas Blake (minister) =

English Puritan clergyman

- Born: circa 1597; Staffordshire
- Died: June 1657; Tamworth, Staffordshire
- Education: Christ Church, Oxford
- Occupations: Parish priest, preacher and controversialist
- Years active: 1620–1657
- Spouse: Jane
- Religion: Puritan
- Church: Church of England
- Ordained: 24 December 1620
- Writings: Birth Privilege, or the Right of Infants to Baptism (1644), Vindiciae Foederis, a Treatise of the Covenant of God with Mankind (1653), Infant Baptism maintain'd in its Latitude (1653), The Covenant Sealed, or a Treatise of the Sacrament of both Covenants (1655), etc.
- Offices held: Vicar of Tamworth with Glascote and Hopwas, Vicar of Alkmund's, Shrewsbury

Thomas Blake (1597?–1657) was an English Puritan clergyman and controversialist of moderate Presbyterian sympathies. He worked in Tamworth, Staffordshire and in Shrewsbury, from which he was ejected over the Engagement controversy. He disputed in print with Richard Baxter over admission to baptism and the Lords Supper.

== Background and education ==
Blake was a native of Staffordshire. He matriculated at Christ Church, Oxford, on 25 October 1616, aged nineteen, or perhaps in his nineteenth year. The uncertainty gives a birth date somewhere between 1596 and 1598. He proceeded to BA on 5 May 1620 and M. A. on 21 February 1623.

== Early career in Tamworth ==
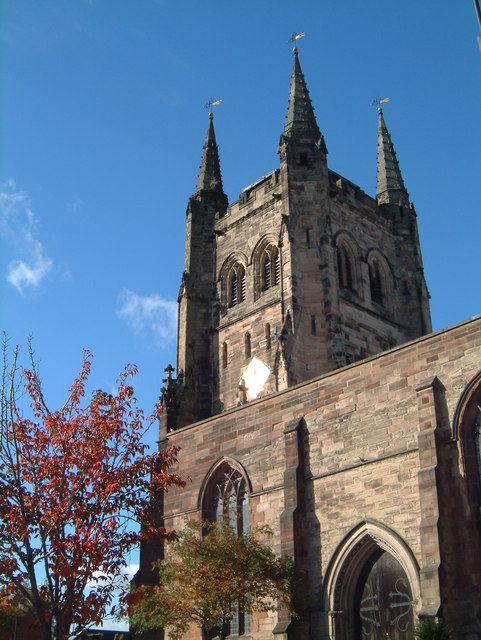
St Editha's church, Tamworth

Wood wrote that after his degrees and ordination, Blake had "some petit employment in the church bestowed on him." William Lamont, a recent biographer of Blake makes clear this was in the Tamworth area, on the border between Staffordshire and Warwickshire. The Clergy of the Church of England database has entries showing his progress within the Church. He was ordained a priest well before he finished his university education by Thomas Morton, the Bishop of Lichfield on Christmas Eve, 1620, at Eccleshall, probably at Eccleshall Castle, an episcopal residence in Staffordshire. Although close to James VI and I, Morton was sympathetic to Puritan perspectives. It must also have been he who licensed Blake to preach on 3 August 1627, as he was still Bishop of Lichfield at that time. An entry in the 1639 Liber Cleri or record book of a canonical visitation under Bishop Robert Wright confirms that Blake was then the curate, generally at that time meaning the incumbent, of Tamworth with Glascote and Hopwas.

The Church of St Editha, Tamworth had been an important collegiate church in the Middle Ages but the college was abolished in the reign of Edward VI. The prebends and advowson were sold off by Elizabeth I in 1581. From 1583 patronage of the church and vicarage belonged to the Repington family. However, Elizabeth's charter of 1588 introduced inconsistencies, leading to disputes, by granting the right to appoint a preacher and two other ministers to the corporation of Tamworth, in their capacity as guardians of Tamworth Grammar School. The preacher was to receive an income of £20 per year and the other ministers £16: they were also allocated a house and garden in the town. Although the Repingtons and the corporation could not agree in principle, they accepted a working compromise by which the family appointed the vicar and the town the assistant ministers. John and Margaret Repington appointed Samuel Hodgkinson vicar of Tamworth in 1610 and he survived in post until 1629. It seems that Blake must have been the preacher appointed by the council, as his licence to preach dates from the period of Hodgkinson's incumbency as vicar. John Repington died in 1626 and was succeeded by a son and namesake, who appointed Blake vicar on 12 November 1629. The corporation also granted him the two curacies or assistant ministries, giving him complete control of the large parish. He took up residence in the old college house. However, Katherine Clifton, 2nd Baroness Clifton had long maintained a claim to the advowson and the old college property, based on rights that pre-dated the abolition of the college. She sold on her claim and it was bought around 1639 by William Comberford, a former High Sheriff of Staffordshire. On 4 May 1642 he served Blake with a process out of the Court of King's Bench for occupying the property without his permission. The case was to come to nothing in itself, although Blake and Comberford were soon on opposite sides in a wider conflict.

== The Civil War and Commonwealth ==
=== First steps in controversy ===
The summer of 1642 brought the onset of the First English Civil War. Tamworth was soon under royalist occupation and was used a base for harassing parliamentarian forces during the fighting at Lichfield. It was taken by parliamentarians from Coventry under William Purefoy on 25 June 1643. In 1644 the town's garrison foiled a concerted royalist assault and it retained Tamwoth the end of the fighting, although until March 1646 it confronted a strong royalist garrison at Lichfield, with devastating consequences for the surrounding countryside. Blake was a strong supporter of parliament and it seems unlikely that he remained in Tamworth during the royalist occupation. His parish work must have been disrupted and it was during these years that he first made his mark as a controversialist. His published writings all focussed on the issue of infant baptism. In The Birth Priviledge, or, Covenant-Holinesse of Beleevers (1644) he defended the universal right to baptism against strict Calvinist exclusiveness, so long as the child's parents expressed visible penitence. Over the next two years he also published critiques of works by both Baptists and Presbyterians that upheld believer's baptism, including Two Treatises by John Tombes.

=== Appointment at Shrewsbury ===
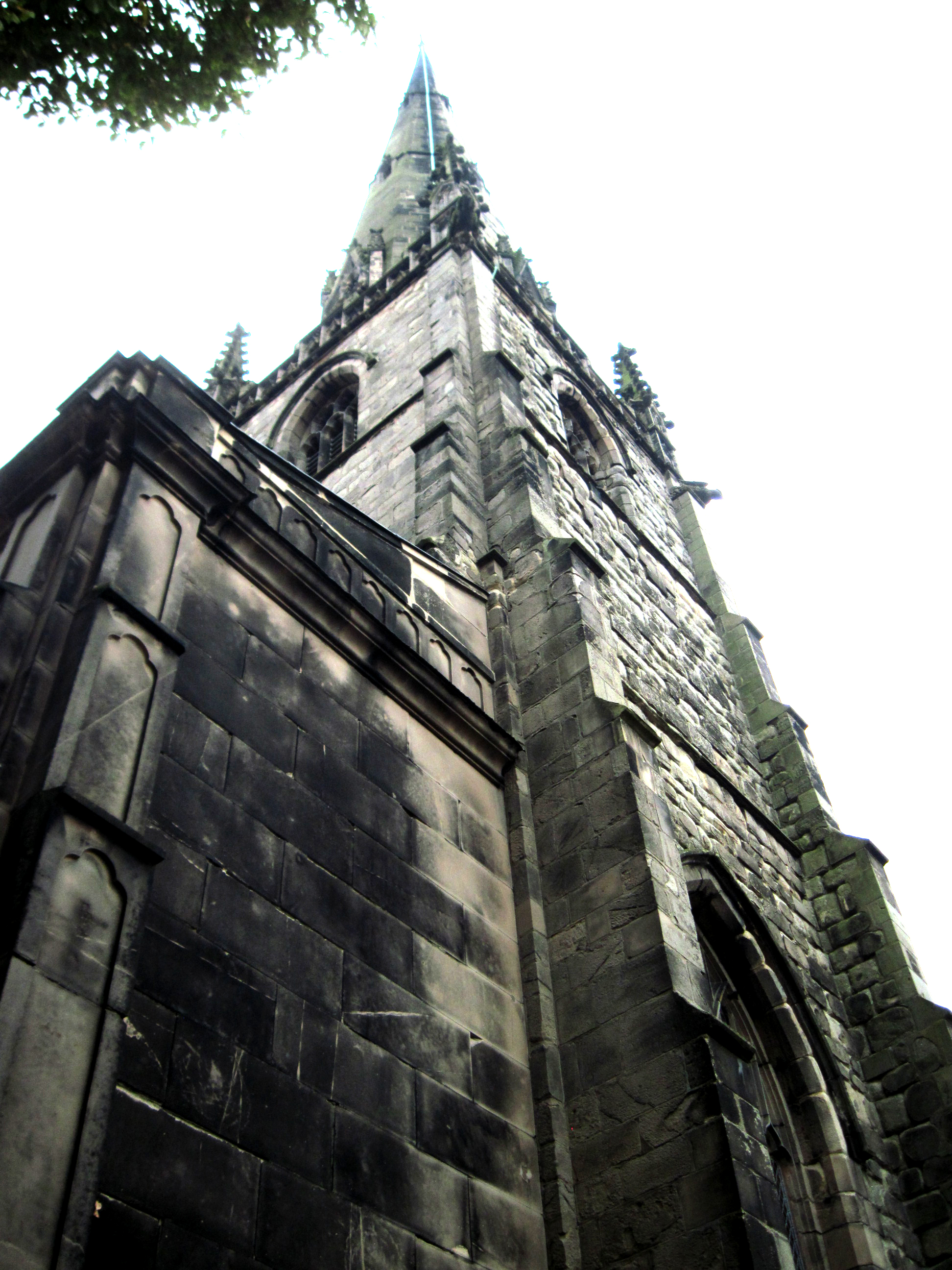
St Alkmund's, Shrewsbury. The tower and spire were retained from the medieval building when the church was largely rebuilt in the late 18th century.

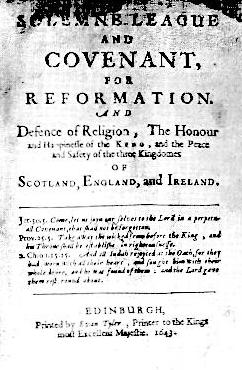
Title page of the Solemn League and Covenant.

Blake then moved to the church of St Alkmund (sometimes rendered Alkmond) in Shrewsbury, where the parliamentary committee had assumed power after overwhelming the royalist garrison on 21 February 1645. It is possible he was established at Shrewsbury in 1645, although the first confirmation came on 21 August 1646, when the corporation agreed to add £5 to his annual income. This corresponds well with the appointment of Ralph Hodges on 27 June 1646 as his replacement at Tamworth.

At the time of Blake's appointment Parliament's alliance with the Scottish Covenanters was still strong and it had decided that each county should plan and secure approval for a Presbyterian polity, in fulfilment of the Solemn League and Covenant, to which parliamentarian forces had subscribed in 1643. Shropshire was one of only eight counties that attempted to put such a scheme into practice. It is set out in a document dated 29 April 1647. This is entitled: The Severall Divisions and Persons for Classicall Presbyteries in the County of Salop and was issued over the signature of Edward Montagu, 2nd Earl of Manchester. It envisaged six classical presbyteries, the first centred on Shrewsbury itself. Thomas Blake was third on its list of eight serving ministers. The ruling elders or lay leaders were headed by the mayor of Shrewsbury and Humphrey Mackworth, the town's governor. As the title "Saint" was now restricted to the Apostles, Blake's church was now named simply "Alkmonds".

In 1648 Blake signed the Solemn League and Covenant. He was one of 57 signatories to a document entitled A Testimony of the Ministers in the Province of Salop to the Truth of Jesus Christ and to the Solemn League and Covenant: as also against the Errors, Heresies and Blasphemies of these times and the Toleration of them. Prominent by its absence from the document was the name of another Shrewsbury clergyman, Thomas Paget, incumbent of St Chad's Church, Shrewsbury and governor Mackworth's parish minister. The Testimony was a broadside against Independency or Congregationalism – a show of strength by the Presbyterian clergy made necessary by the weakening of their political position. Presbyterianism had been fatally wounded by the Scottish Engager invasion in support of Charles I. By the end of 1648 Pride's Purge had removed moderate Presbyterians from the English House of Commons and cleared the way for the execution of the king.

=== The Engagement dispute ===
The divisions between the different strains of Puritanism led to conflict after Parliament in March 1650 imposed the Oath of Engagement: "I do declare and promise, that I will be true and faithful to the Commonwealth of England, as it is now established, without a King or House of Lords." This ran counter to the Covenant, which envisaged an established Presbyterian church headed by the monarch. In Shrewsbury Blake and Samuel Fisher of Mary's church preached against the Engagement, while Paget preached for it. As the controversy began to become more heated, there was an outbreak of bubonic plague, starting at Frankwell in June and spreading rapidly through the town. Lamont considers the plague the likely reason for Blake and Fisher's departure from Shrewsbury. However, Auden and Coulton agree with Brook in making the departure essentially a political expulsion. On 16 August the English Council of State wrote ordering Governor Mackworth "to turn out of his garrison all such persons as, either in the pulpit or elsewhere, by seditious words endeavour to stir up sedition and uproar among the people." On 23 August the Council wrote again, specifically naming Blake and Fisher and ordering Mackworth to arrest and "examine them as to their former and late offences." Fisher later wrote of their "continual expectation of arrest" during this period, when he and Blake were engaged in their pastoral office during the plague. They found refuge for a time at Myddle with its minister, Joshua Richardson, who allowed them to preach. The leading lay Puritan in the area was Robert Corbet of Stanwardine and his secretary, Richard Gough, later mentioned the visit in his famous Antiquities & Memoirs of the village.

The two chiefe and ablest Ministers in Shrewsbury, viz. Mr. Thomas Blake, Minister of St. Chads, and Mr. Fisher of St. Mary's removed to Myddle and dwelt both in Mr. Gittin's house att the higher well; they preached often att Myddle. Mr. Fisher was a man of myddle stature and age, a fatt plump body, a round visage, and blacke haire. Mr. Blake was a tall spare man, his haire sandy browne; hee was somewhat aged a moderate, sober, grave, pious man; hee wrote a learned Treatise of the Covenants, wherein hee tooke some modest exceptions against some things mentioned by Mr. Baxter in his book of Justification.

Later they stayed for some months at West Felton with Samuel Hildersham, a puritan writer and son of Arthur Hildersham, and his wife Mary. The following year, back at Tamworth, Blake dedicated to them a new tract, Vindiciae foederis, or, A Treatise of the Covenant of God Entered with Mankind, thanking them for their "free and liberal entertainment" and the use of their library.

=== Return to Tamworth ===
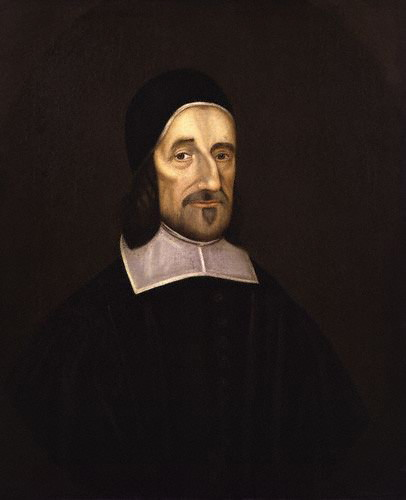
Richard Baxter

Blake returned to his ministry in Tamworth. It is not clear exactly how this was achieved. However, it seems his successor, Ralph Hodges was occupying benefices in plurality, as he was appointed Rector of Birmingham on 29 June 1646, only two days after he took up the post at Tamworth. Blake's allies in Tamworth had probably changed little and Sir John Repington was to survive until 1662, so it seems it was possible to ease him back into position. He was then nominated one of the assistants to the commissioners of Staffordshire for the ejecting of scandalous ministers and schoolmasters.

From Tamworth Blake carried on his writing of argumentative theological works. His focus moved from baptism to admission to the Lord's Supper, where he advocated the most open and inclusive approach. This brought him into disputes with Richard Baxter, whose Aphorismes of Justification (1649) set the issue within an explication of Covenant theology, demanding that candidates for the Lord's Supper "might knowingly and seriously professe their consent, (and if they subscribed their names, it would be more solemly engaging) and this before they receive the sacrament of the Lord's Supper." The controversy continued until Blake's death, although with a degree of courtesy on both sides, despite provocation from Giles Firmin, a disciple of Baxter.

== Death ==
Blake was in good health when he made his will on 11 January 1656 but he died at Tamworth, and was interred in his own church on 11 June 1657. His funeral sermon was preached by Anthony Burgess of Sutton Coldfield and was published in 1658, along with an oration by Samuel Shaw, then schoolmaster at Tamworth. Blake left a widow, Jane, but no children. His estate was divided between Jane and his brother, John.

== Works ==
The following are the chief works named by Alexander Balloch Grosart, based on a list in Anthony Wood's Athenae Oxonienses:

- Birth Privilege, or the Right of Infants to Baptism, 1644.
- Infant's Baptism freed from Antichristianisme. In a full Repulse given to Mr. Ch. Blackwood in his Assault of that Part of Christ's Possession which he holds in his Heritage of Infants, entitled "The Storming of Antichrist," 1645. Wood misnames Blackwood 'Charles' for 'Christopher.'
- A Moderate Answer to the Two Questions: (1) Whether there be sufficient Ground from Scripture to warrant the Conscience of a Christian to present his Infants to the Sacrament of Baptism; (2) Whether it be not sinful for a Christian to receive the Sacrament in a Mixt Assembly, 1645.
- An Answer to Mr. Tombes his Letter in Vindication of the Birth-privilege of Believers and their issue, 1646.
- Testimony of the Ministers of Stafford to Solemn League, 1648.
- Vindiciae Foederis, a Treatise of the Covenant of God with Mankind, 1653.
- Infant Baptism maintain'd in its Latitude, 1653.
- The Covenant Sealed, or a Treatise of the Sacrament of both Covenants, 1655.
- Postscript to the Rev. and Learned Mr. Richard Baxter, 1655; answered by Richard Baxter.
- Mr. Jo. Humphrey's Second Vindication of a Disciplinary Anti-erastian, Orthodox, Free Admission to the Lord's Supper, taken into consideration, 1656, supporting John Humfrey; and other pamphlets and occasional sermons.

Ebenezer, or Profitable Truths after Pestilential Times, 1666, which has been attributed to him, was not his, but by another Thomas Blake, who was ejected from East Hoadley, Sussex.
