= St James' Church, Enfield Highway =

Coordinates: 51°39′21″N 0°2′49″W

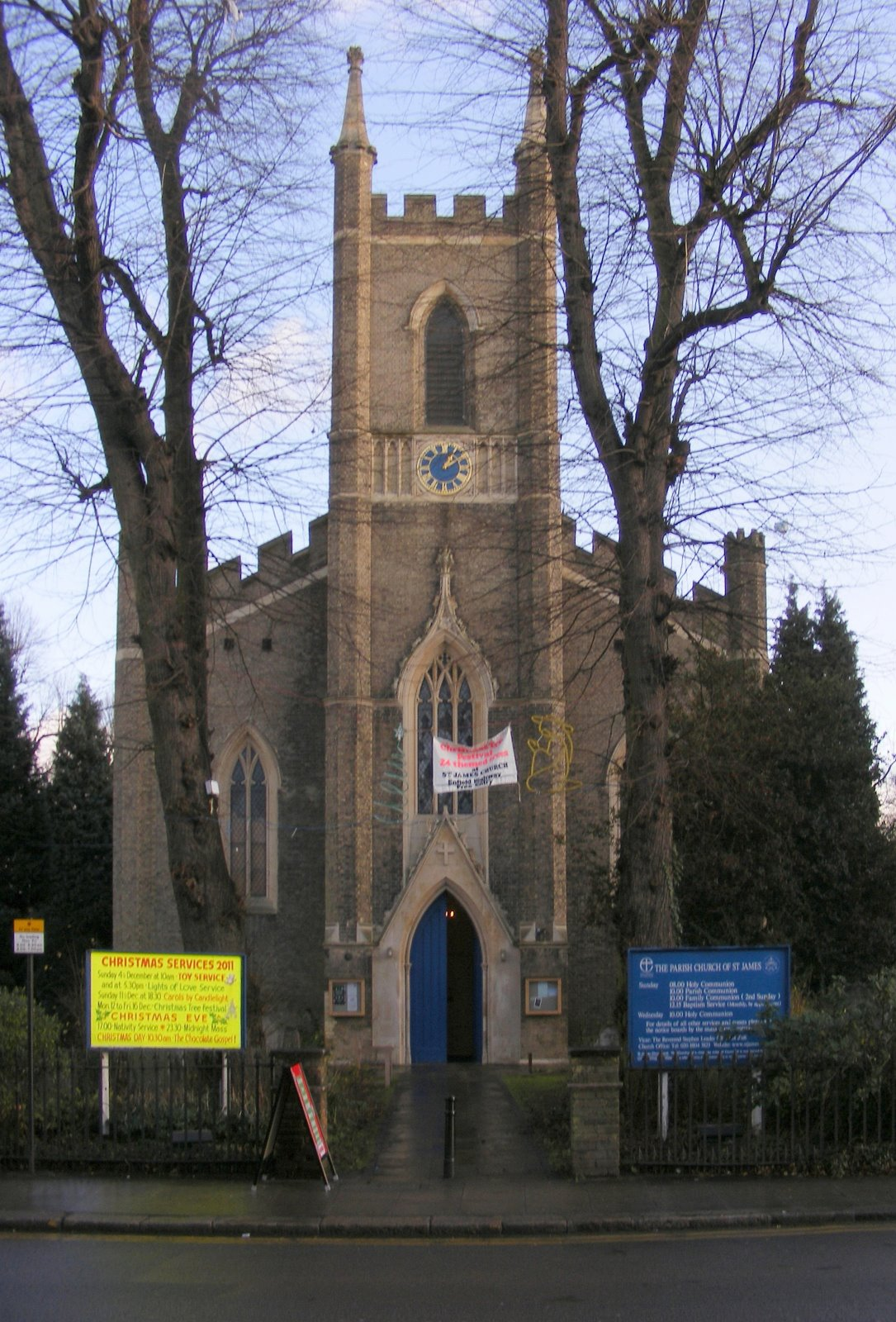
- St James' Church, Enfield Highway
- Location: 115 Hertford Road, Enfield, Middlesex
- Country: England
- Denomination: Church of England
- Churchmanship: Broad and Central
- Website: www.stjameschurch.cc

History
- Founded: 1831

Architecture
- Architect: William Conrad Lochner
- Style: Commissioners' Gothic
- Years built: 1831

Administration
- Diocese: London
- Archdeaconry: Hampstead
- Deanery: Enfield
- Parish: St James with St Barnabas, Enfield Highway and Brimsdown

Clergy
- Vicar: The Revd Ian Gallagher

St James' Church, Enfield Highway, is an active Anglican church in Hertford Road, Enfield Highway, Greater London. It is a parish church in the deanery of Enfield, the archdeaconry of Hampstead, and the diocese of London.

== History ==
St James' was the first Anglican place of worship to be established in the parish of Enfield in addition to the parish church. It was built by subscription as a chapel of ease on land given by Woodham Connop and consecrated on 15 October 1831 by the Bishop of London, Charles Blomfield. A district was assigned to the church on 9 December 1833, comprising the whole of the parish of east of a line drawn at a distance of 150 yards to the west of the main road from Edmonton to Cheshunt. The church was licensed for marriages in 1845.

The architect was William Conrad Lochner (c. 1779 – 1861), surveyor to the Royal Exchange Assurance Co., who designed a church in a very similar style at de Beauvoir Town, Hackney, and restored St Andrew's church, Enfield. It was built from stock brick with stone dressings in a plain "Commissioners gothic" style with aisles and a western tower. Structural problems with the church soon emerged. In 1841 the Ecclesiologist magazine reported "St James Enfield Highway which has been consecrated six or eight years, is already condemned as 'dangerous', since the heavy tied roof is threatening to fall in from the rotting of the ends of the beams, which are said to have been laid in the most disgraceful manner upon the mere damp brick-work"

The first incumbent was T.W. Thirlwall. He was succeeded by Charles Warren, J.R. Nicholl and, in 1841, John Fuller Russell. Russell, who remained at the church until 1854, was a theological writer, a committee member of the high church Cambridge Camden Society and a notable collector of early religious art. In 1854 he published Obedience to the Church in Things Ritual: Two Sermons Preached in St. James’s Church, Enfield Highway.

A large chancel was added at the expense of the Rev J. Harman in memory of his wife and consecrated in 1864. The east end of the church was seriously damaged by a fire in 1967, and considerable alterations were in the course of repairs, including the removal of the chancel arch and extension of the sanctuary.

With its population of over 26,900 in the localities of Enfield Highway and Brimsdown, it is one of the largest parishes in England. The church has been designated by English Heritage as a Grade II listed building.
