= Peter Boughey =

Peter Boughey OBE
- Peter Boughey OBE
- Born: Edward Peter Fletcher Boughey; 27 November 1911
- Died: 20 June 1986 (aged 74)
- Burial place: Hertfordshire
- Spouse(s): Halina Anna Ambrozewicz (1945–1949); Nina Gladys Nixon (1949–?); Emmeline Amy de Falbe (1973–?)
- Parent(s): Commander Edward Harry Fletcher Boughey and Ethel Georgina Emily (née Harrison)
- Espionage activity
- Allegiance: United Kingdom
- Service branch: Special Operations Executive
- Rank: Lieutenant Colonel

Lieutenant-Colonel Edward Peter Fletcher Boughey OBE (27 November 1911 – 20 June 1986) was a distinguished member of the Special Operations Executive during World War II operating as a special agent in Hungary, Poland and Yugoslavia.

== Biography ==
Edward Peter Fletcher Boughey was the son of Commander Edward Harry Fletcher Boughey and Ethel Georgina Emily (née Harrison). He was educated at Bedford Modern School between 1922 and 1925, and Haileybury.

Boughey served with the Special Operations Executive almost from its inception until the end of World War II. He is reported to have joined the service in Yugoslavia in 1940 recuperating from tuberculosis. Although certain details of his missions are still classified, he was known to be in Belgrade in 1941 where as agent in charge of financial transactions ‘he was particularly effective in securing favourable rates for British pounds on the black market in his project of building up a local currency war chest, and considerable sums of money ended up in the Anglo-Palestine Bank in Tel Aviv’. In 1942 there are accounts of him in Yugoslavia and again in Hungary in 1944. His mission in Hungary was almost a disaster as within a few hours of landing there, Boughey and his team were captured and delivered to the Gestapo. He then managed to escape from a prisoner of war camp in Silesia and reach England via Odessa.

Boughey was made OBE in 1945 for gallant and distinguished services in the field during World War II.

On 11 March 1945 Boughey married Halina Anna Ambrozewicz, the daughter of Count Stanislaw Ambrozewicz. His first wife also appears to have worked for the Special Operations Executive. He divorced his first wife in 1949. On 12 May 1949, Boughey married his second wife, Nina Gladys Nixon, the daughter of Brinsley Nixon. On 7 September 1973 Boughey married Emmeline Amy de Falbe, daughter of Brigadier-General Vigant William de Falbe.

Boughey died on 20 June 1986.
