= John Tombes =

English priest (1603–1676)

John Tombes (c. 1603 – 22 May 1676) was an English clergyman of Presbyterian and Baptist views.

== Early life ==
He was born at Bewdley, Worcestershire, in 1602 or 1603. He matriculated at Magdalen Hall, Oxford, 23 January 1618, aged 15. His tutor there was William Pemble; among his college friends was John Geree. He received a Bachelor of Arts 12 June 1621. After Pemble's death, he succeeded him in 1623 as catechism lecturer.

His reputation as a tutor was considerable; among his pupils was John Wilkins. He graduated with his Master of Arts 16 April 1624, took orders, and quickly came into note as a preacher. From about 1624 to 1630, he was one of the lecturers of St. Martin Carfax. As early as 1627, he began to have doubts on the subject of infant baptism. Leaving the university in 1630, he was for a short time preacher at Worcester, but in November was instituted vicar of Leominster, Herefordshire. His preaching was popular, and he won the admiration of the high Anglican John Scudamore, 1st Viscount Scudamore.

== Commonwealth years ==
He left Leominster in 1643 (after February), having been appointed by Nathaniel Fiennes to supersede George Williamson as vicar of All Saints, Bristol. On the surrender of Bristol to the royalists, 26 July, he moved to London 22 September, where he became rector of St. Gabriel, Fenchurch, vacant by the sequestration of Ralph Cook, B.D. In church government, his views were Presbyterian. He put his scruples on infant baptism to the Westminster Assembly, but got no satisfaction.

Declining to baptise infants, he was removed from St. Gabriel's early in 1645, but appointed (before May) master of the Temple, on condition of not preaching on baptism. He published on this topic; for licensing one of his tracts, the parliamentary censor, John Bachiler, was attacked in the Westminster Assembly, 25 December 1645, by William Gouge; and Stephen Marshall was appointed to answer the tract. As preacher at the Temple, Tombes directed his polemic against antinomianism. In 1646, he had an interview with Oliver Cromwell and gave him his books. His fellow-townsmen chose him to the perpetual curacy of Bewdley, then a chapelry in the parish of Ribbesford; his successor at the Temple was Richard Johnson.

At Bewdley, Tombes organised a small Baptist church, which produced three Baptist preachers. He regularly attended Richard Baxter's Thursday lecture at Kidderminster, and tried to draw Baxter, as he had already drawn Thomas Blake, into a written discussion. Baxter would engage with him only in a heated debate, which took place 1 January 1650, before a crowded audience at Bewdley chapel, and lasted from nine in the morning till five at night. The occasion became rowdy, and the magistrate had to intervene. In 1653, Baxter would write of the ambition of Baptists like Tombes "to baptise all the maids of Bewdly naked". It had the effect of causing Tombes to leave Bewdley, where he was succeeded in 1650 by Henry Oasland. With Bewdley he had held for a time the rectory of Ross, Herefordshire; this he resigned on being appointed to the mastership of St. Catherine's Hospital, Ledbury, Herefordshire.

After his encounter with Baxter, Tombes's debates were numerous. In July 1652, he went to Oxford to dispute on baptism with Henry Savage. On the same topic he disputed at Abergavenny, 5 September 1653, with Henry Vaughan and John Cragge. He had not given up his claim to the vicarage of Leominster, and returned to it apparently in 1654, when he was appointed (20 March) one of Cromwell's 'triers.' Against Quakerism and popery he wrote tracts in 1660, to which Baxter prefixed friendly letters.

== After the Restoration ==
At the Restoration of 1660 Tombes came up to London, and wrote in favour of the royal supremacy in matters ecclesiastical as well as civil. Lord Clarendon stood his friend. He conformed in a lay capacity, resigning his preferments and declining offers of promotion. After 1661, he lived chiefly at Salisbury, where his second wife had property and communicated as an Anglican. Firmly holding his special tenet, he was always a courteous disputant, and a man of exceptional capacity and attainments.

He died at Salisbury 22 May 1676, and was buried 25 May in St. Edmund's churchyard.
