= Arthur Tozer Russell =

English clergyman and hymnwriter (1806–1874)

Arthur Tozer Russell (20 March 1806 – 18 November 1874) was an English clergyman and hymnwriter.

== Life ==
The elder son of Thomas Russell, he was born at Northampton on 20 March 1806. He received his early education at St. Saviour's School, Southwark, and Merchant Taylors' School, London. Having read some of the writings of Thomas Belsham, he wished to qualify for the Unitarian ministry. Belsham got him support at Hackney College, with a view to his entrance as a divinity student at Manchester College, York. His exhibition was temporarily withdrawn; but he entered Manchester College, on the Hackney foundation, in September 1822, under the name of Cloutt (his father's alternative surname), among his fellow-entrants being Robert Brook Aspland and James Martineau. At the annual examination, 30 July 1824, he delivered a Latin oration, under the name of Russell. He then left York, without finishing his course. John Kenrick, his classics tutor at Manchester College, York, wrote (1 June 1824) that Russell had made the acquaintance of Francis Wrangham, archdeacon of Cleveland, and had decided to study for orders.

In 1825 Russell entered as a sizar at St John's College, Cambridge, and took the Hulsean prize in his freshman year. After becoming a scholar of St. John's (1827), he was ordained deacon (1827) by John Kaye, bishop of Lincoln, and licensed to the curacy of Great Gransden, Huntingdonshire. In 1830 he was ordained priest, became vicar of Caxton, Cambridgeshire, and graduated LL.B. In 1852 he became vicar of Whaddon, Cambridgeshire, exchanging this benefice in 1863 for the vicarage of St. Thomas, Toxteth Park, Liverpool.

In 1868 Russell became vicar of Wrockwardine Wood, Shropshire. His last preferment was to the rectory of Southwick, Sussex, in 1874; but his health was poor. He died at Southwick on 18 November 1874.

== Works ==
Russell's career as a hymn-writer began early, his first hymns being included in the third edition of his father's Collection. Hymns by him, original and translated, are in The Christian Life, 1847, and in Psalms and Hymns, 1851. Twenty-one appeared in The Choral Hymn-book, 1861, edited by the Rev. Peter Maurice, D.D. Of his original hymns four are included in Lord Selborne's Book of Praise, 1862, and around fifty appeared in other collections. He is known for the addition in 1851 of a sixth verse, designed to improve its theology, to the well-known hymn, Nearer my God, to Thee (1841), by Sarah Fuller Adams. He published also Hymn Tunes, Original and Selected, in 1843. In all he produced about one hundred and forty original and one hundred and thirty translated hymns.

His theological publications, in addition to his Hulsean prize essay on The Law … a Schoolmaster, Cambridge, 1826, and a sermon on the Real Presence, Cambridge, 1857, are:

- Sermons on … Festivals … of the Church, Cambridge, 1830.
- Remarks upon … Keble's Visitation Sermon, Cambridge, 1837.
- Apology … translated from the … Latin of Bishop Jewell, &c. (with notes), 1834 (Crockford); 1839; Oxford, 1840.
- A Manual of Daily Prayer, 1841.
- Advent and other Sermons, [1855]
- A Letter to the Bishop of Oxford upon "Essays and Reviews", 1862, (in reply to an article in Edinburgh Review, April, 1861, by Dean Stanley).
- Memorials of … Thomas Fuller, 1844.
- Memoirs of … Lancelot Andrewes, 1863.

Among his contributions to reviews was a series of critical articles on the Greek Testament in the British and Foreign Evangelical Review, 1862–3. He was one of the editors of a new edition of Slatter's Old Oxford University Guide [1861?]. Among his manuscripts was an unpublished History of the Bishops of England and Wales.

== Notes ==
Attribution

This article incorporates text from a publication now in the public domain: Lee, Sidney, ed. (1897). "Russell, Arthur Tozer". Dictionary of National Biography. Vol. 49. London: Smith, Elder & Co.
