= William Orme (minister) =

Scottish Congregational minister and biographer

William Orme (1787–1830) was a Scottish Congregational minister, known as a biographer of Richard Baxter and other nonconformist figures.

== Life ==
He was born at Falkirk, Stirlingshire, on 3 February 1787. His parents moved to Edinburgh, where in 1792 he began his education under a schoolmaster named Waugh. On 1 July 1800 he was apprenticed for five years to a wheelwright and turner.

His father died in October 1803. About this time Orme came under the influence of James Alexander Haldane, whose preaching at the Tabernacle in Leith Walk, Edinburgh, had attracted him. In October 1805 he was admitted by Robert Haldane as a student for the ministry at a seminary under George Cowie. The usual term of study was two years, but Orme's periods of study, interrupted by a preaching mission in Fife (1806), amounted to little more than a year in all. On 11 March 1807 he became pastor of the congregational church at Perth where he was ordained.

About 1809 he broke with Robert Haldane, in consequence of Haldane's adoption of Baptist views, and took part in the controversy that arose. He declined a call to the congregational church at Dundee. In the development of Scottish congregationalism he took an active part, especially aiding in the formation (1813) of the Congregational Union of Scotland, and in the establishment (1814) of a divinity hall at Glasgow.

On 7 October 1824, he became pastor of the congregational church at Camberwell Green, Surrey, and soon afterwards was elected foreign secretary of the London Missionary Society. He died in his prime on 8 May 1830, and was buried on 17 May at Bunhill Fields. His portrait, engraved by Thomson from a painting by Wildman, was published in the Evangelical Magazine for January 1830. He was twice married, and left a widow.

== Works ==
He published, in addition to separate sermons and pamphlets:

- 'Memoirs of the Life, Writings, and Religious Connections of John Owen, D.D.,’ &c., 1820.
- 'Remarkable Passages in the Life of William Kiffin,’ &c., 1823.
- 'Bibliotheca Biblica ... List of Books on Sacred Literature, with Notices, Biographical, Critical,’ &c., Edinburgh, 1824.
- 'Memoirs, including … Remains of John Urquhart,’ &c., 1827, 2 vols.

Posthumous was:

- 'Life and Times of Richard Baxter,’ &c., 1830, 2 vols. This was partly printed at the time of his death; it was edited by Thomas Russell. It accompanied an edition of Baxter's 'Practical Works,’ begun by Orme in 1827. The second volume contains a detailed critique of Baxter's writings.

His two volumes on Richard Baxter were commended by Sir James Stephen. Andrew Thomson superseded him as a biographer of John Owen, and Joseph Ivimey for William Kiffin.
