= Anthony Burges =

English clergyman and writer (died 1663)

Anthony Burges or Burgess (died 1664) was a Nonconformist English clergyman, a prolific preacher and writer.

== Life ==
He was a son of a schoolmaster at Watford, and not related to Cornelius Burgess, nor to John Burges, his predecessor at Sutton Coldfield. He studied at St. John's College, Cambridge from 1623. He became a Fellow of Emmanuel College, Cambridge. At Emmanuel he was tutor to John Wallis, who said of Burgess that he was "a pious, learned and able scholar, a good disputant, a good tutor, an eminent preacher, [and] a sound and orthodox divine."

From 1635 to 1662 he was Rector at Sutton Coldfield, but his lectures upon Justification were preached in London, at St Lawrence Jewry. He was a member of the Westminster Assembly. In 1645 he was one of five signatories to the Introduction to John Ball's Treatise of the Covenant of Grace. During the First English Civil War he took refuge in Coventry, and lectured to the parliamentary garrison. He was deprived of his position as Rector in 1662, after the Restoration, despite John Hacket's urging him to conform, and thereafter lived at Tamworth.

== Works ==
In 1640 he prepared for the press and published the collected sermons of Dr John Stoughton (died 1639), which were entrusted to him for the purpose by Stoughton's widow, Jane, daughter of John Browne of Frampton.

He published various separate sermons, including a funeral sermon on Thomas Blake, and:

- The Difficulty of, and the Encouragements to a Reformation; a Sermon preached before the Honourable House of Commons at the publike fast, Septem. 27. 1643, 1643
- Romes Cruelty and Apostacie Declared, in a Sermon Preached on the Fifth of November, 1644, before the Honourable House of Commons, 1645
- Vindiciae Legis, a Vindication of the Moral Law . . . (against Antinomians) in twenty-nine lectures at Lawrence Jury, 1646.
- The True Doctrine of Justification Asserted and Vindicated from the Errors of Papists, Arminians, Socinians, and Antinomians, in thirty lectures at Lawrence Jury, (1st edition), 1648.
- The True Doctrine of Justification... or, A Treatise of Justification, Including On the Natural Righteousness of God, and Imputed Righteousness of Christ (2nd and 3rd editions), 1651/1654
- Spiritual Refining, or, a Treatise of Grace and Assurance (120 sermons), 1652.
- CXLV (145) Expository Sermons on the whole 17th chapter of the Gospel according to St. John, 1656
- The Scripture Directory for church-officers and people, or, A Practical Commentary upon the whole third chapter of the First Epistle of St. Paul to the Corinthians, to which is annexed the Godly and Natural Man's Choice, &c., 1659.
- A Treatise of Original Sin, 1658.
- An Expository Comment, Doctrinal, Controversal, and Practical upon the whole first chapter to the Second Epistle of St. Paul to the Corinthians, 1661
