= Edward Boughen =

English Royalist divine

Edward Boughen, D.D. (1587–1660?), was an English Royalist divine.

== Life ==
Boughen was a native of Buckinghamshire. He was educated at Westminster School, and was then elected to a scholarship at Christ Church, Oxford (B.A. 1609, M.A. 1612). He was appointed chaplain to John Howson, bishop of Oxford; he afterwards held a cure at Bray in Berkshire; and on 13 April 1633 was collated to the rectory of Woodchurch in Kent. The presbyterian inhabitants of Woodchurch petitioned against him in 1640 for having acted as a justice of the peace, and he was ejected from both his livings. He then returned to Oxford, where he was created D.D. on 1 July 1646, shortly before the surrender of the garrison to the parliamentary forces; he later lived at Chartham in Kent. Anthony Wood wrote: "This Dr. Boughen, as I have been informed, lived to see his majesty restored, and what before he had lost, he did obtain"; and Baker also states that "Boughen died soon after the Restoration, aged 74, plus minus". It is not improbable that he is identical with the Edward Boughen, prebendary of Marden in the church of Chichester, whose death occurred between 29 May and 11 August 1660.

== Theology ==
Boughen defended Arminian theological views through his writings.

== Works ==
Boughen was a learned man and a staunch defender of the church of England. He published:

- Several sermons, including Unanimity in Judgment and Affection, necessary to Unity of Doctrine and Uniformity in Discipline. A Sermon preached at Canterbury at the Visitation of the Lord Archbishop's Peculiars. In St. Margaret's Church, April 14, 1635,' Lond. 1635; reprinted in 1714, with a preface by Thomas Brett, rector of Betteshanger in Kent.
- 'An Account of the Church Catholick: where it was before the Reformation, and whether Rome were or bee the Church Catholick. In answer to two letters signed T. B., London 1653.
- Observations upon the Ordinance of the Lords and Commons at Westminster. After Advice had with their Assembly of Divines, for the Ordination of Ministers pro Tempore, according to their Directory for Ordination, and Rules for Examination therein expressed, Oxford, 1645.
- Principles of Religion; or, a short Exposition of the Catechism of the Church of England, Oxford, 1646; London, 1663, 1668, 1671. The later editions bear this title: A short Exposition of the Catechism of the Church of England, with the Church Catechism itself, and Order of Confirmation, in English and Latin for the use of Scholars, London 1671. Some of the prayers annexed are very singular. That for the king implores "that our sovereign King Charles may be strengthened with the faith of Abraham, endued with the mildness of Moses, armed with the magnanimity of Joshua, exalted with the humility of David, beautified with the wisdom of Solomon"; for the queen: "That our most gracious queen Catharine may be holy and devout as Hesther, loving to the king as Rachel, fruitful as Leah, wise as Rebecca, faithful and obedient as Sarah", etc.
- Mr. Geree's Case of Conscience sifted; wherein is enquired whether the king (considering his oath at coronation to protect the clergy and their privileges) can with a safe Conscience consent to the Abrogation of Episcopacy, London 1648, 1650. John Geree published a reply under the title of Σινιορραγία, the Sifter's Sieve broken.'
- Poems in the university collections on King James's visit to Christ Church in 1605, and on the marriage of the Princess Elizabeth in 1613.

== Notes and references ==
- "Boughen, Edward" . Dictionary of National Biography. London: Smith, Elder & Co. 1885–1900.

=== Sources ===
- Tyacke, Nicholas (2001). Aspects of English Protestantism C. 1530-1700. Manchester: University Press.
