= Thomas Tully =

English Calvinist priest; (1620–1676)

Thomas Tully (1620–1676) was an Anglican cleric.

== Life ==
The son of George Tully of Carlisle, Cumbria, he was born in St Mary's parish there on 22 July 1620. He was educated in the parish free school under John Winter, and afterwards at Barton Kirk in Westmorland. He matriculated at The Queen's College, Oxford, on 17 October 1634, graduating B.A. on 4 July 1639 and M.A. on 1 November 1642. He was elected a fellow of the college on 23 November 1643 and admitted 25 March 1644.

When Oxford was occupied by the parliamentarians he retired and then obtained the mastership of the grammar school of Tetbury in Oxfordshire. Returning to Oxford, he was admitted B.D. on 23 July 1657, and in the year following was appointed principal of St. Edmund Hall and rector of Grittleton in Wiltshire. After the Restoration he was created D.D. on 9 November 1660, and nominated one of the royal chaplains in ordinary, and in April 1675 was appointed Dean of Ripon. According to Nicholas Tyacke, he was an important conforming Calvinist voice in the post-Restoration Church of England, even if his strictness, in the view of Anthony Wood, hindered his advancement.

He died in the parsonage at Grittleton on 14 January 1676.

== Works ==
He was the author of:

- Logica Apodeictica, sive Tractatus brevis et dilucidus de demonstratione; cum dissertatiuncula Gassendi eodem pertinente, Oxford, 1662, arguing against Pierre Gassendi.
- A Letter written to a Friend in Wilts upon occasion of a late ridiculous Pamphlet, wherein was inserted a pretended Prophecie of Thomas Becket's, London, 1666.
- Praecipuorum Theologiae Capitum Enchiridion Didacticum, London, 1668; Oxford, 1683; Oxford, 1700.
- Justificatio Paulina sine Operibus, Oxford, 1674. This was a criticism of the Harmonia Apostolica of George Bull.

Tully also wrote several other controversial pamphlets against Richard Baxter and others.
