= George Lawson (English clergyman) =

English clergymen

Personal life
- Born: 1598
- Died: 1678

Religious life
- Religion: Christianity

George Lawson (1598–1678) was an English divine and writer. He was also rector of More, Shropshire.

== Biography ==
George Lawson was born in 1598, and educated at Puritan Emmanuel College, Cambridge. Lawson was a protégé of William Laud.

Lawson was a supporter of the parliament, and accordingly retained his rectory during the Commonwealth.

Lawson wrote to Baxter on the appearance of the latter's Aphorismes of Justification, 1649, and Baxter valued his criticisms; "especially", he writes, "his instigating me to the study of politicks [...] did prove a singular benefit to me". Baxter says that he had seen in manuscript arguments by Lawson in favour of taking the engagement.

He became rector of More, Shropshire, before 22 April 1686. His religious views inclined to Arminianism. He was buried at More 12 July 1678.

Lawson, who was certainly not a Yorkshireman, must be distinguished from George Lawson (1606–1670) of Moreby, son of George Lawson of Poppleton, Yorkshire, who became rector of Eykring, Northamptonshire, and who may be identical with the George Lawson who was ejected as a royalist from the vicarage of Mears Ashby, Northamptonshire, by the parliamentarians (Walker, Attempt, ii. 296), and then became schoolmaster at Houghton Conquest, Bedfordshire.

== Works ==
- Examination of the Political Part of Hobbes s "Leviathan," London, 1657, 12mo.
- Theo-Politica, or a Body of Divinity, London, 1659, 8vo; 2nd ed. 1705, commended by Baxter.
- Politica Sacra et Civilis. London, 1660, 4to.
- Exposition of the Epistle to the Hebrews. London, 1662, fol.
- Magna Charta Ecclesiæ Universalis. London, 1686, 8vo : 3rd ed. 1687.

== Notes and references ==
This article incorporates text from a publication now in the public domain: "Lawson, George (d.1678)". Dictionary of National Biography. London: Smith, Elder & Co. 1885–1900.

=== Sources ===
- Archbold, William Arthur Jobson (1885). "Lawson, George (d.1678)". Dictionary of National Biography, 1885–1900. Vol. 32. London: Smith, Elder & Co. p. 289.
- Hobbes, Thomas (2011). Leviathan – Revised Edition. Peterborough: Broadview Press.
