= Richard Baxter =

17th-century English Puritan church leader and theologian

The Reverend Richard Baxter
- Born: 12 November 1615; Rowton, Shropshire, England
- Died: 8 December 1691 (aged 76); London, England
- Occupations: church leader, theologian, controversialist, poet
- Theological work
- Tradition or movement: Puritan, Amyraldian
- Notable ideas: Neonomianism, Unlimited atonement

Richard Baxter (12 November 1615 – 8 December 1691) was an English Nonconformist church leader and theologian from Rowton, Shropshire, who has been described as "the chief of English Protestant Schoolmen". He made his reputation in the 1640s and 1650s by his ministry at Kidderminster in Worcestershire, when he also began a long and prolific career as a theological writer.

Following the Act of Uniformity 1662, Baxter refused an appointment as Bishop of Hereford and was expelled from the Church of England. He became one of the most influential leaders of the Nonconformist movement, spending time in prison. His views remain controversial within the Calvinist tradition of Predestination because he taught that Christians are placed under a type of faith-law.

== Personal details ==
Baxter was born on 12 November 1615 at Rowton, Shropshire, in the home of his maternal grandfather, and baptised at its then parish church at High Ercall, before moving in February 1626 to his parents' home in Eaton Constantine.

On 10 September 1662, Baxter married Margaret Charlton, who died in 1681.

== Early life ==
Richard's early education was poor, being mainly in the hands of the local clergy, themselves virtually illiterate. He was helped by John Owen, master of the free school at Wroxeter (and not to be confused with the Nonconformist theologian, Baxter's contemporary, of the same name), where he studied from about 1629 to 1632, and made fair progress in Latin. On Owen's advice he did not proceed to Oxford (a step which he afterwards regretted), but went to Ludlow Castle to read with Richard Wickstead, chaplain to the Council of Wales and the Marches.

He was reluctantly persuaded to go to court, and he went to London under the patronage of Sir Henry Herbert, Master of the Revels, with the intention of doing so, but soon returned home, resolved to study divinity. He was confirmed in the decision by the death of his mother.

After three months spent working for the dying Owen as a teacher at Wroxeter, Baxter read theology with Francis Garbet, the local clergyman, adding to his reading (initially in devotional writings, of Richard Sibbes, William Perkins and Ezekiel Culverwell, as well as the Calvinist Edmund Bunny at age 14, and then in the scholastic philosophers) orthodox Church of England theology in Richard Hooker and George Downham, and arguments from conforming puritans in John Sprint and John Burges. In about 1634, he met Joseph Symonds (assistant to Thomas Gataker) and Walter Cradock, two Nonconformists.

== Early ministry, 1638–1660 ==
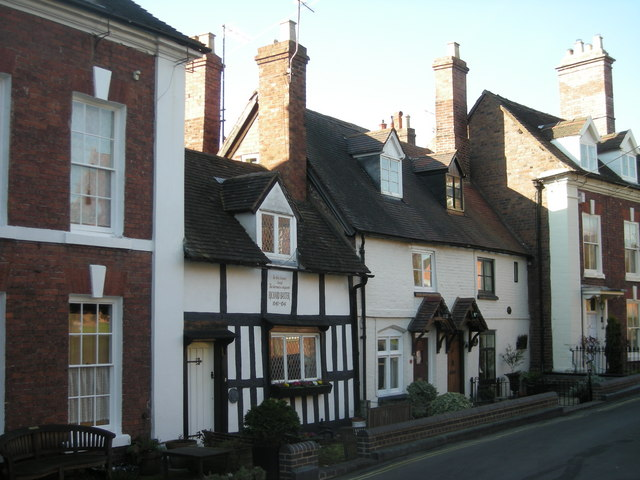
Baxter's house in Bridgnorth, Shropshire

With the help of James Berry, who later became a colonel in the New Model Army, in 1638 Baxter became master of the free grammar school at Dudley. He commenced his ministry after being ordained by John Thornborough, Bishop of Worcester and was soon transferred to Bridgnorth, in Shropshire.

Baxter remained at Bridgnorth for nearly two years, during which time he took a special interest in the controversy relating to Nonconformity and the Church of England. He soon became alienated from the Church on several matters; and after the requirement of the "et cetera oath", he rejected episcopacy in its English form. Although generally regarded as a Presbyterian, he was prepared to accept a modified Episcopalianism, but regarded all forms of church government as secondary to religious practice.

=== Kidderminster ===
One of the first measures of the Long Parliament was to reform the clergy; with this view, a committee was appointed to receive complaints against them. Among the complainants were the inhabitants of Kidderminster. The vicar George Dance agreed that he would give £60 a year, out of his income of £200, to a preacher who should be chosen by certain trustees. Baxter was invited to deliver a sermon before the people, and was unanimously elected as the minister of St Mary and All Saints' Church, Kidderminster. This happened in April 1641, when he was twenty-six.

His ministry continued, with many interruptions, for about 19 years; and during that time he accomplished many reforms in Kidderminster and the neighbourhood. He formed the ministers in the country around him into an association, uniting them irrespective of their differences as Presbyterians, Episcopalians and Independents. The Reformed Pastor was a book which Baxter published in relation to the general ministerial efforts he promoted.

=== The English Civil War and Commonwealth ===
When the First English Civil War began in August 1642, like many Baxter tried to avoid taking sides, but Worcestershire was a Royalist stronghold, and he was temporarily retired to the Parliamentarian town of Gloucester. He returned to Worcestershire late in 1642 only to be driven out again, and moved to Coventry, another Parliamentarian stronghold. There he found himself with no fewer than 30 fugitive ministers, among whom were Richard Vines, Anthony Burges, John Bryan and Obadiah Grew. He officiated each Sunday as chaplain to the garrison, preaching a sermon each to the soldiery, and the townspeople and strangers. Included among the congregants were Sir Richard Skeffington, Colonel Godfrey Bosvile, George Abbot the layman scholar, and others. After the Battle of Naseby he took the situation of chaplain to Colonel Edward Whalley's regiment, and continued to hold it till February 1647. During these stormy years he wrote his Aphorisms of Justification, which on its appearance in 1649, excited great controversy. There were numerous critics such as Anthony Burges, John Crandon, William Eyre, George Lawson, John Tombes, Thomas Tully, and John Wallis, although Baxter was closest to Christopher Cartwright.

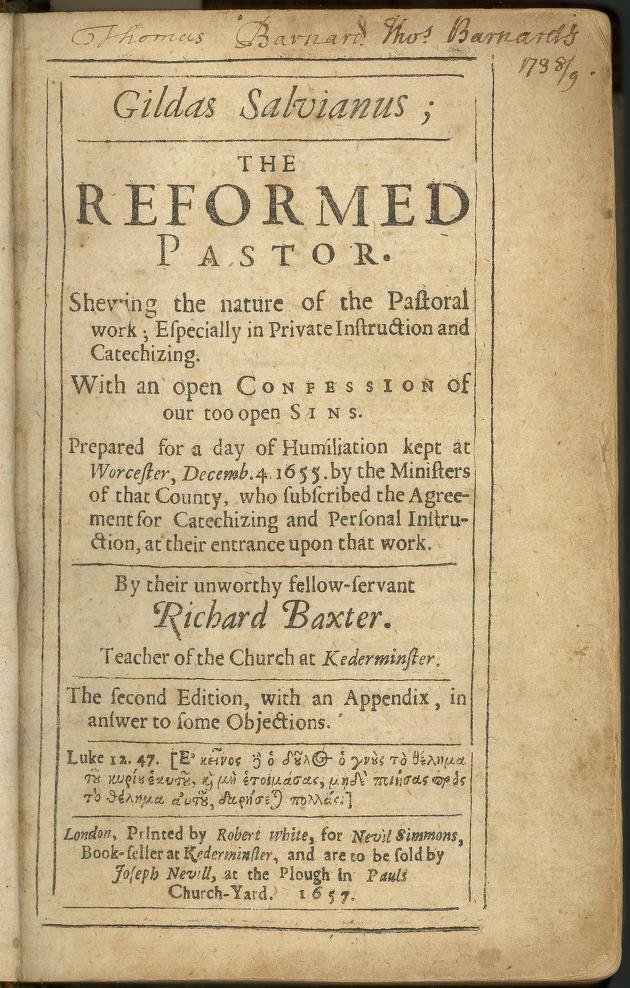
Title page of a 1657 edition of The Reformed Pastor.

Baxter's connexion with the Parliamentary army was a very characteristic one. He joined it that he might, if possible, contract the growth of sectaries in that field, and maintain the cause of constitutional government in opposition to republican tendencies of the time. He regretted that he had not previously accepted Oliver Cromwell's offer to become chaplain to the Ironsides. Cromwell avoided him; but Baxter, having to preach before him after he had assumed the Protectorship, chose for his subject the old topic of the divisions of the church, and in subsequent interviews argued with him about liberty of conscience, and even defended the monarchy he had subverted. This contact with Cromwell occurred when Baxter was summoned to London to assist in settling "the fundamentals of religion".

In 1647, Baxter was staying at the home of Lady Rouse, wife of Sir Thomas Rouse, 1st Baronet, of Rous Lench, Worcestershire. There, though debilitated by illness, he wrote the most of a major work, The Saints' Everlasting Rest (1650).

On his recovery he returned to Kidderminster, where he also became a prominent political leader. His sensitive conscience led him into conflict with almost all the contending parties in state and church. An all-day debate on 1 January 1650, with John Tombes at Bewdley was attended by about 1500 people on each side and ended in confused disorder.

During this period he campaigned for the establishment of a new university in Shrewsbury to serve Wales, utilising buildings that were then used by Shrewsbury School. Lack of funding prevented success, and the premises ultimately became Shrewsbury town library.

== Ministry following the Restoration, 1660–1691 ==
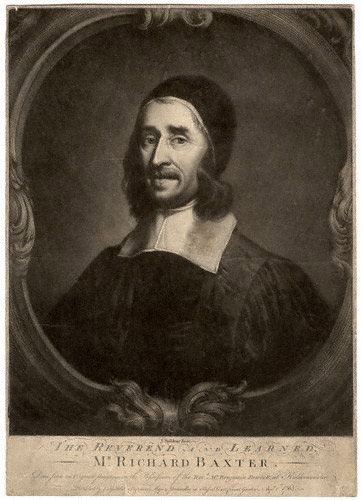
18th-century engraving of Richard Baxter, after a 17th-century portrait by John Riley.

After the 1660 Stuart Restoration, Baxter moved to London, where he preached until the Act of Uniformity 1662 took effect. His hope that moderate dissenters like himself could remain within the Church of England proved ill-founded, after this objective was obstructed by those on both sides. The Savoy Conference resulted in Baxter's Reformed Liturgy, though it was cast aside without consideration. Baxter continued to advocate for a comprehensive "national church", off and on, until his death.

The same reputation which Baxter had obtained in the country he secured in London. The power of his preaching was universally felt, and his capacity for business placed him at the head of his party. He was made a Royal chaplain, and offered the Bishopric of Hereford, but could not accept the offer without conforming. After his refusal, he was not allowed, even before the passing of the Act of Uniformity, to be a curate in Kidderminster, and Bishop George Morley prohibited him from preaching in the Diocese of Worcester.

=== Legal troubles ===
From 1662 until the indulgence of 1687, Baxter's life was constantly disturbed by persecution of one kind or another. He retired to Acton in Middlesex, for the purpose of quiet study, but was placed in prison for keeping a conventicle, a dissenters’ religious meeting. Baxter procured a habeas corpus in the court of common pleas.

He was taken up for preaching in London after the licences granted in 1672 were recalled by the King. The meeting house which he had built for himself in Oxendon Street was closed to him after he had preached there only once.

In 1680, he was taken from his house; and though he was released that he might die at home, his books and goods were seized. In 1684, he was carried three times to the sessions house, being scarcely able to stand, and without any apparent cause was made to enter into a bond for £400 in security for his good behaviour.

His worst encounter was with the Chief Justice, Sir George Jeffreys, in May 1685. He had been committed to the King's Bench Prison on the charge of libelling the Church in his Paraphrase on the New Testament, and was tried before Jeffreys on this accusation. No authoritative report of the trial exists; if the partisan account on which tradition is based is accepted, Jeffreys was infuriated. Baxter was sentenced to pay 500 marks, to lie in prison till the money was paid, and to be bound to his good behaviour for seven years. Jeffreys is even said to have proposed he should be whipped behind a cart. Baxter was now approaching 70 years old, and remained in prison for 18 months, until the government, hoping to win his influence, remitted the fine and released him.

== Later writings and last years ==
Baxter's health had grown even worse, yet this was the period of his greatest activity as a writer. He wrote 168 or so separate works, including major treatises such as the Christian Directory, the Methodus Theologiae Christianae, and the Catholic Theology. His Breviate of the Life of Mrs Margaret Baxter records the virtues of his wife and tenderness which otherwise might not have been known. A slim devotional work published in 1658 under the title Call to the Unconverted to Turn and Live formed one of the core extra-biblical texts of evangelicalism until at least the middle of the 19th century.

The remainder of his life, from 1687 onwards, was passed peacefully. He died in London and his funeral was attended by churchmen as well as dissenters.

== Theology ==
Richard Baxter rejected the idea of a limited atonement in favour of a universal atonement, which drew him into a long debate with Calvinist theologian John Owen. Interpreting the kingdom of God in terms of Christ as Christus Victor and Rector of all men, Baxter explained Christ's death as an act of universal redemption (penal and vicarious, though substitutionary in explication), in virtue of which God has made a new covenant offering pardon and amnesty to the penitent. Repentance and faith, being obedient to this covenant, are the conditions of salvation.

Baxter insisted that the Calvinists of his day ran the danger of ignoring the conditions that came with God's new covenant. Justification, Baxter insisted, required at least some degree of faith as the human response to the love of God.

Baxter's theology was set forth most elaborately in his Latin Methodus Theologiæ Christianæ (London, 1681); the Christian Directory (1673) contains the practical part of his system; and Catholic Theology (1675) is an English exposition. His theology made Baxter very unpopular among his contemporaries and even into the next century caused a split among the Dissenters. As summarised by Thomas W. Jenkyn, it differed from the Calvinism on four points:

1. The atonement of Christ did not consist in his suffering the identical but the equivalent punishment (i.e., one which would have the same effect in moral government) as that deserved by mankind because of offended law. Christ died for sins, not persons. The benefits of substitutionary atonement are accessible and available to all men for their salvation.
2. The atonement is not limited to a select few, but is available to all who will believe in Christ.
3. The righteousness that is imputed to the believer in the work of justification is not the righteousness of Christ, but is by virtue of the faith of the believer himself in Christ.
4. Every sinner has a distinct agency of his own to exert in the process of his conversion, which is to believe in Christ.

== Legacy ==
Richard Baxter is remembered in the Church of England with a commemoration on 14 June.

=== Literary legacy and mentions ===
AG Matthews, in an article "The Works of Richard Baxter: an Annotated List" (Congregational Historical Society Transactions, XI (1932)) lists 141 books written by Baxter. Geoffrey Nuttall, in his biography of Baxter, published in 1965, reproduces this list, noting that one of the listed works, Fasciculus literarum (1680), was, in fact, written by John Hinckley.

In 1665, his works were translated into German by the Lutheran theologian, Johann Fischer.

In 1674, Baxter cast in a new form the substance of Arthur Dent's book The Plain Man's Pathway to Heaven under the title, The Poor Man's Family Book. In this way, Arthur Dent of South Shoebury was a link between Baxter and another great Puritan, John Bunyan.

In 1679 Baxter made one of the very few known allusions to Sir Thomas Browne's discourse The Garden of Cyrus, critically declaring to newly ordained priests, You shall have more.. solid truth than those in their learned Network treatises.

Baxter's influence in New England is referenced in the first chapter of the 19th century devotional work "I Will Be A Lady – a book for girls" by Mrs. Tuthill.

In George Eliot's Mill on the Floss Richard Baxter's "Saints Everlasting Rest" is listed as one of Aunt Glegg's books.

Baxter wrote many hymns, such as the self-published 'He wants not friends that hath thy love'.

Max Weber (1864–1920), the German sociologist, made significant use of Baxter's works in developing his thesis for "The Protestant Ethic and the Spirit of Capitalism" (1904, 1920). Weber takes advantage of Baxter's notion that the production of wealth by itself gives glory to God, and is bad only insofar as it gives birth to idleness and "living merrily without care." Weber quotes Baxter who wrote "you may labour to be rich for God, though not for the flesh and sin."

Robert K. Merton (1910–2003), founder of the sociology of science and well known for the so-called Merton Thesis, also followed Weber in making use of Baxter's Christian Directory as "a typical presentation of the leading elements in the Puritan ethos."

In 2015, on the 400th anniversary of Richard Baxter's birth an exhibition of the correspondence between Baxter and Katherine Gell was made. The letters were said to be the basis of a book of Baxter's letters which was in preparation.

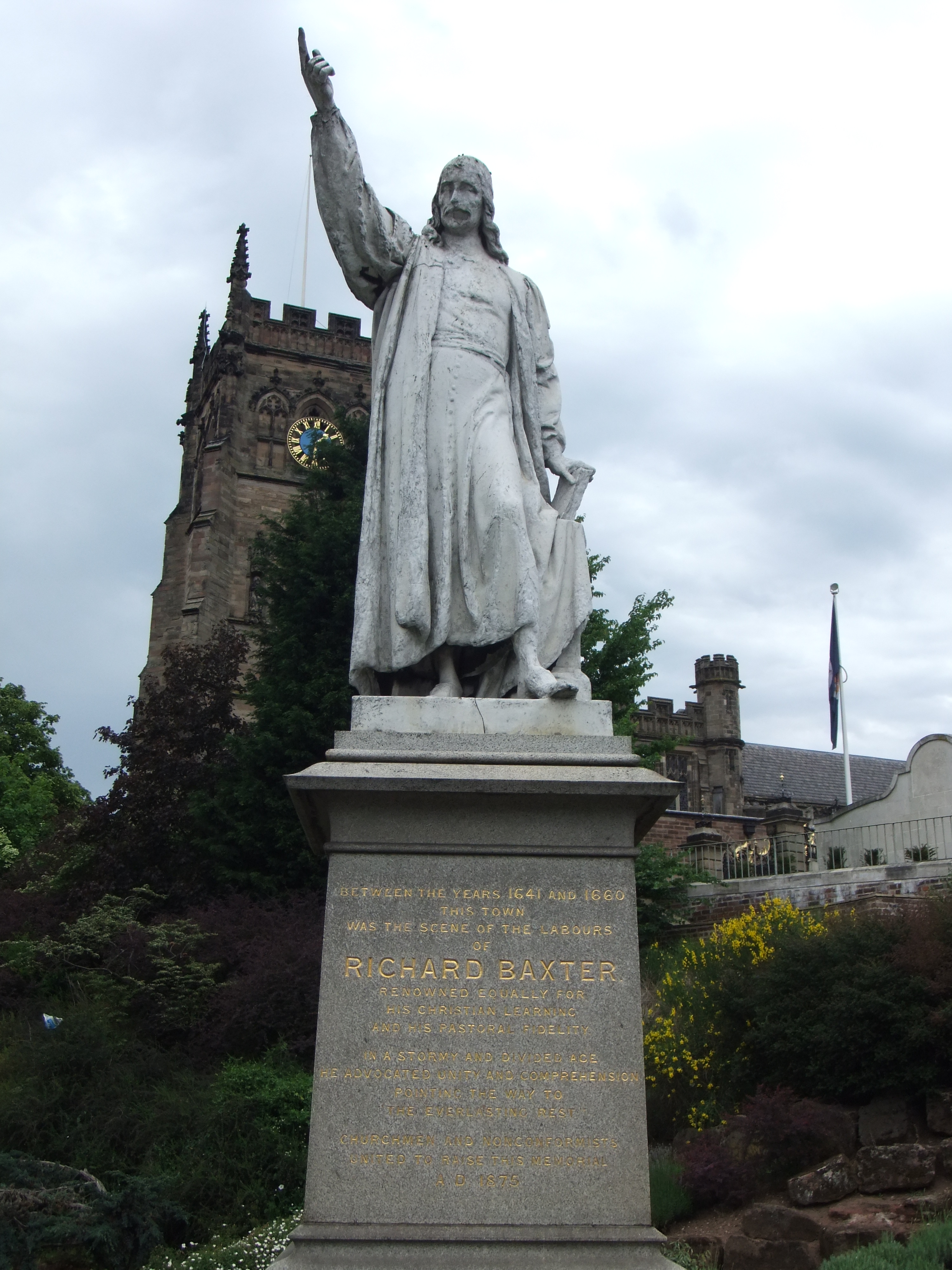
Richard Baxter Statue at St Mary's Church, Kidderminster

=== Monuments ===
Baxter's House in Bridgnorth is still standing near the High Street with a name plaque on the front.

The Richard Baxter Monument in the civic parish of Wolverley and Cookley (neighbouring Kidderminster) was built around 1850 in memory of Baxter. It is a Grade II listed structure and resides on a hilltop on Blakeshall Common. This tribute of general esteem was erected nearly two centuries after Baxter's death, sculpted by Sir Thomas Brock and unveiled 28 July 1875. Originally in the Bull Ring, it was moved to its present site outside St Mary's parish church in March 1967.

The Baxter Monument in Rowton, Shropshire (the village of his birth) is a squat stone obelisk with a bronze plaque on which is written "Richard Baxter great divine author and eminent citizen of the 17th century. Son of Richard Baxter and Beatrice née Adney born here in Rowton AD 1615. Died in London 1691". It resides on a triangle of grass at the centre of the village and is probably of late 19th century construction. It was designated a Grade II listed structure in 1983. There is a portrait of Baxter in Dr Williams's Library, Gordon Square, London.

Baxter House, a boarding house at Old Swinford Hospital school in Stourbridge, is named after him. In Kidderminster, Baxter College (formerly Harry Cheshire High School), and a public park, Baxter Gardens, are both named after him.

== Works ==
- Self-Denial – one of the sermons of Richard Baxter
- Plain Scripture Proof of Infants Church-Membership and Baptism by Richard Baxter (1656)
- A Call to the Unconverted, to Turn and Live by Richard Baxter (Preface by author dated 12/11/1657), revised and slightly abridged by the American Tract Society (after 1830).
- Five Disputations of Church-Government, and Worship by Richard Baxter (1659)
- A Saint or a Brute: The Certain Necessity and Excellency of Holiness by Richard Baxter (1662)
- The Life of Faith by Richard Baxter (1670)
- Reliquiæ Baxterianæ: or, Mr. Richard Baxter's Narrative of the Most Memorable Passages of His Life and Times by Richard Baxter (1696)
- An Abridgement of Mr. Baxter's History of His Life and Times: With an Account of the Ministers, &c. who Were Ejected at the Restauration, of King Charles II... and the Continuation of Their History to the Passing of the Bill Against Occasional Conformity, in 1711 by Edmund Calamy (1713)
- The Reformed Pastor; A Discourse on the Pastoral Office by Richard Baxter, ed. Samuel Parker (1808)
- A Christian Directory: Or, A Body of Practical Divinity and Cases of Conscience, Volume I by Richard Baxter (Richard Edwards, 1825)
- A Christian Directory: Or, A Body of Practical Divinity and Cases of Conscience, Volume II by Richard Baxter (Richard Edwards, 1825)
- A Christian Directory: Or, A Body of Practical Divinity and Cases of Conscience, Volume III by Richard Baxter (Richard Edwards, 1825)
- A Christian Directory: Or, A Body of Practical Divinity and Cases of Conscience, Volume IV by Richard Baxter (Richard Edwards, 1825)
- A Christian Directory: Or, A Body of Practical Divinity and Cases of Conscience, Volume V by Richard Baxter (Richard Edwards, 1825)
- The Description, Reasons and Reward of Walking With God: On Genesis V.24 by Richard Baxter (J. Owen, 1825)
- Memoirs of Margaret Baxter: Daughter of Francis Charlton and Wife of Richard Baxter (Richard Edwards, 1826)
- A Call to the Unconverted. To Which Are Added Several Valuable Essays by Richard Baxter, with an Introduction by Thomas Chalmers (1829)
- The Practical Works of the Rev. Richard Baxter, Volume I, ed. William Orme (1830)
- The Practical Works of the Rev. Richard Baxter, Volume II, ed. William Orme (1830)
- The Practical Works of the Rev. Richard Baxter, Volume III, ed. William Orme (1830)
- The Practical Works of the Rev. Richard Baxter, Volume IV, ed. William Orme (1830)
- The Practical Works of the Rev. Richard Baxter, Volume V, ed. William Orme (1830)
- The Practical Works of the Rev. Richard Baxter, Volume VI, ed. William Orme (1830)
- The Practical Works of the Rev. Richard Baxter, Volume VII, ed. William Orme (1830)
- The Practical Works of the Rev. Richard Baxter, Volume X, ed. William Orme (1830)
- The Practical Works of the Rev. Richard Baxter, Volume XI, ed. William Orme (1830)
- The Practical Works of the Rev. Richard Baxter, Volume XII, ed. William Orme (1830)
- The Practical Works of the Rev. Richard Baxter, Volume XIII, ed. William Orme (1830)
- The Practical Works of the Rev. Richard Baxter, Volume XV, ed. William Orme (1830)
- The Practical Works of the Rev. Richard Baxter, Volume XVI, ed. William Orme (1830)
- The Practical Works of the Rev. Richard Baxter, Volume XVII, ed. William Orme (1830)
- The Practical Works of the Rev. Richard Baxter, Volume XVIII, ed. William Orme (1830)
- The Practical Works of the Rev. Richard Baxter, Volume XIX, ed. William Orme (1830)
- The Practical Works of the Rev. Richard Baxter, Volume XXI, ed. William Orme (1830)
- The Practical Works of the Rev. Richard Baxter, Volume XXII, ed. William Orme (1830)
- The Practical Works of the Rev. Richard Baxter, Volume XXIII, ed. William Orme (1830)
- The Life and Times of the Rev. Richard Baxter: With a Critical Examination of His Writings, Volume I by William Orme (1831)
- The Life and Times of the Rev. Richard Baxter: With a Critical Examination of His Writings, Volume II by William Orme (1831)
- Select Practical Writings of Richard Baxter, Volume I, ed. Leonard Bacon (1831)
- Baxter, Richard (1833), Converse with God in Solitude, C Wells.
- ——— (1835), Bacon, Leonard (ed.), Select Practical Writings, vol. II.
- ——— (1835), Jesuit Juggling: Forty Popish Frauds Detected and Disclosed, Gould, Kendall & Lincoln.
- ——— (1846), Jenkyn, Thomas W (ed.), "Making Light of Christ and Salvation," "A Call to the Unconverted," "The Last Work of a Believer," and "The Shedding Abroad of God's Love", New York, Wiley & Putnam.
- ——— (1868), Grosart, Alexander Balloch (ed.), What We Must Do to Be Saved.
- ——— (1872), The Saints' Everlasting Rest; or, A Treatise on the Blessed State of the Saints in their Enjoyment of God in Heaven, T. Nelson & Sons.
- ———, How to Spend the Day with God, theologynetwork.org.
- The Life of Rev. Richard Baxter (circa 1834 ed.), The American Tract Society.

== See also ==
- Benjamin Agus
- List of abolitionist forerunners

== Sources ==
- Allison, Christopher FitzSimons (1966). The Rise of Moralism: The Proclamation of the Gospel from Hooker to Baxter (2003 ed.). Regent College Publishing. ISBN 978-1573832571.
- Carr, A.M (1983). Shrewsbury Library:its history and restoration. Shropshire Libraries. ISBN 0-903802-26-0. OCLC 12478648.
- Dickins, Gordon (1987). An Illustrated Literary Guide to Shropshire. Shropshire Libraries. ISBN 0903802376.
- Durston, Christopher (2004). "Berry, James (died 1691)". Oxford Dictionary of National Biography (online ed.). Oxford University Press. doi:10.1093/ref:odnb/2264. (Subscription, Wikipedia Library access or UK public library membership required.)

Attribution

- Endnote:
  - Encyclopædia Britannica's most useful source was Baxter's autobiography, called Reliquiae Baxterianae or Mr Richard Baxter's Narrative of the most memorable Passages of his Life and Times (published by Matthew Sylvester in 1696). Edmund Calamy the Younger abridged this work (1702). The abridgment forms the first volume of the account of the ejected ministers; the reply to the accusations which had been brought against Baxter is found in the second volume of Calamy's Continuation. William Orme's Life and Times of Richard Baxter appeared in 2 vols. in 1830; it also forms the first volume of "Practical Works" (1830, reprinted 1868). Sir James Stephen's paper on Baxter, contributed originally to the Edinburgh Review, is reprinted in the second volume of his Essays. Estimates of Baxter were given by John Tulloch in his English Puritanism and Its Leaders, and by Dean Stanley in his address at the inauguration of the statue to Baxter at Kidderminster (see Macmillan's Magazine, xxxii. 385).
