= William Fenner =

English Puritan divine

William Fenner (1600–1640) was an English Puritan divine.

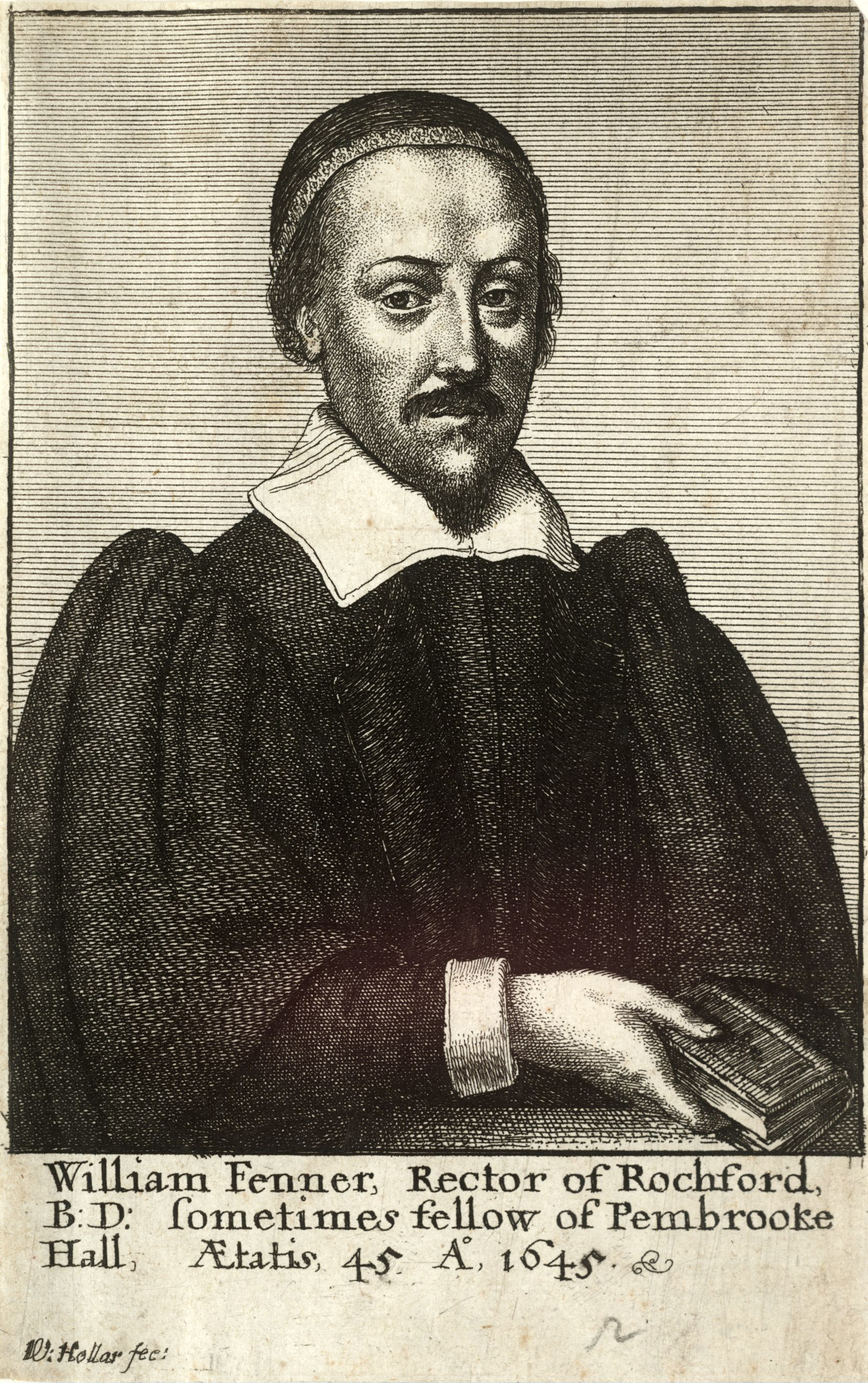
William Fenner by Wenceslas Hollar

== Life ==
Fenner was educated at Pembroke College, Cambridge, where he took the degree of B.A. in 1618, and that of M.A. in the following year. In 1622 he was incorporated a member of Oxford University. He also took holy orders, and is believed to have been for a time chaplain to the Earl of Warwick, and to have ministered at Sedgley, Staffordshire, where "his labours were greatly blessed". He was forced to leave this cure on account of his religious principles about 1626–7, and travelled about for some months, preaching from place to place, and Benjamin Brook states that he was consulted as a casuist, and admired by some of the nobility.

In 1627 he proceeded B.D., and two years later was presented to the living of Rochford, Essex, where he was until his death in 1640. Fenner was appreciated as a preacher, one of his sermons being quoted by Edward Williams, and his writings enjoyed popularity for some time, as plain in manner while zealous in tone.

== Works ==
Fenner wrote:

- The Soul's Looking Glass, with a treatise of Conscience, 1640 (edited by Edmund Calamy)
- Riches of Grace, 1641
- A Treatise of Affections, or the Soul's Pulse, 1641
- Christ's Alarm to drowsie Sinners, or Christ's Epistles to his Churches, 1646
- A Divine Message to the Elect Souls (eight sermons), 1646
- The Sacrifice of the Faithful; or a treatise showing the Nature, Property and Efficacy of zealous Prayer
- The Spiritual Man's Directorie, 1648
- Practicall Divinitie, or Gospel Light shining forth in several choice Sermons, 1650
- Hidden Manna, or the Mystery of Saving Grace, 1652
- The Danger of deferred Repentance discovered, 1654
- Four profitable Treatises very useful for Christian Practice, 1657

Collected editions of his works were published in 1651 and 1657.
