= Bunhill Fields =

Former burial ground in London

Bunhill Fields Burial Ground
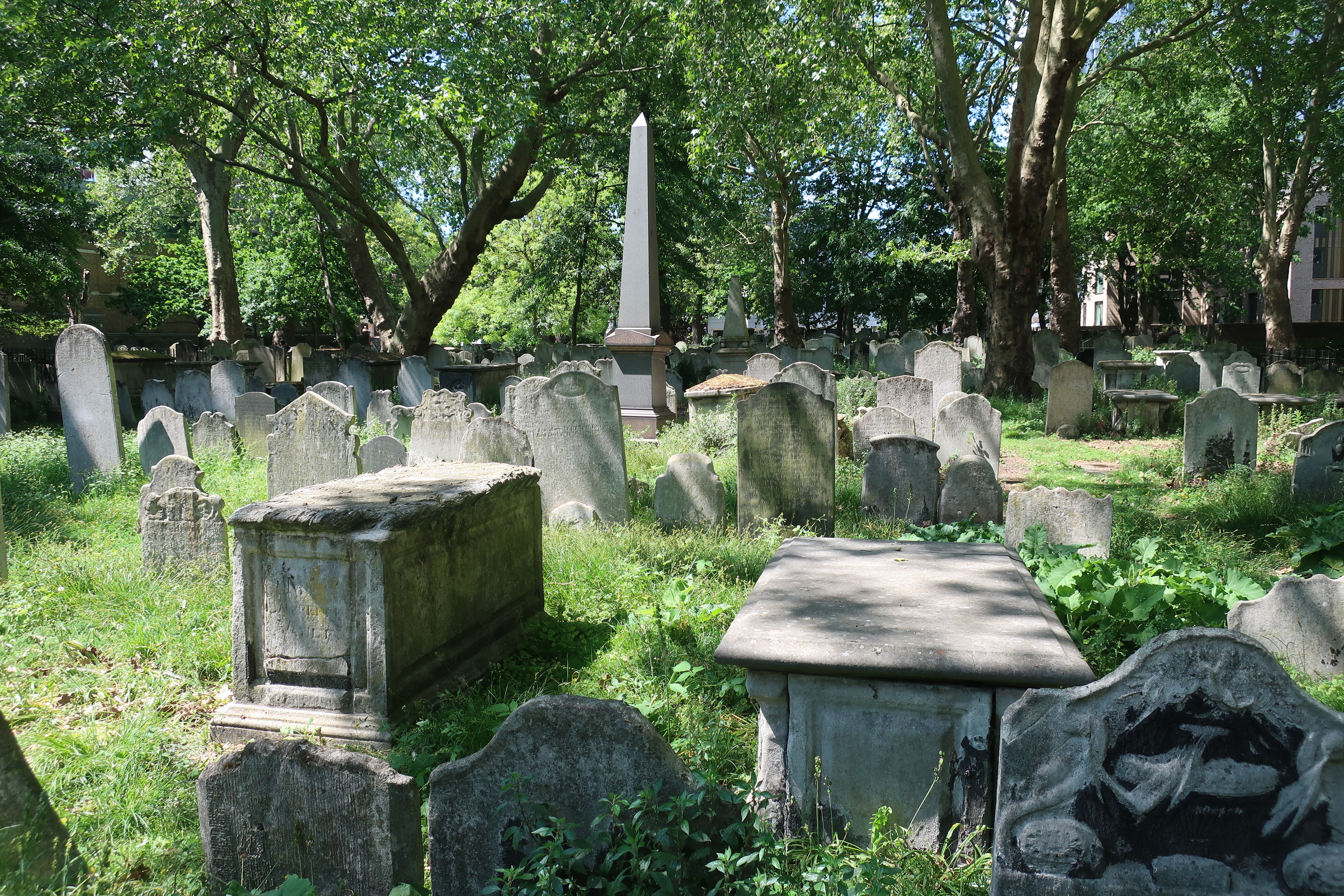
- Monuments in Bunhill Fields
- Interactive map of Bunhill Fields Burial Ground

Details
- Established: 1665
- Location: City Road, Islington, London, EC1Y 2BG
- Country: England
- Coordinates: 51°31′25″N 0°05′20″W
- Type: Public (closed)
- Style: Frequently Nonconformist, many social classes represented
- Owned by: City of London Corporation
- Size: 1.6 hectares (4.0 acres)
- No. of graves: 120,000
- Website: Official website

Listed Building – Grade I
- Official name: Bunhill Fields Burial Ground
- Designated: 5 May 2010
- Reference no.: 1001713

National Register of Historic Parks and Gardens
- Official name: Bunhill Fields Burial Ground
- Designated: 5 May 2010
- Reference no.: 1001713

Bunhill Fields is a former burial ground in central London, in the London Borough of Islington, just north of the City of London. What remains is about 1.6 hectares (4.0 acres) in extent and the bulk of the site is a public garden maintained by the City of London Corporation.

It was first in devoted use as a burial ground from 1665 until 1854, in which period approximately 123,000 interments were estimated to have taken place. Over 2,000 monuments remain, for the most part in concentrated blocks. It was a prototype of land-use protected, nondenominational grounds, and was particularly favoured by nonconformists who passed their final years in the region. It contains the graves of many notable people, including John Bunyan (died 1688), author of The Pilgrim's Progress; Daniel Defoe (died 1731), author of Robinson Crusoe; William Blake (died 1827), artist, poet, and mystic; Susanna Wesley (died 1742), known as the "Mother of Methodism" through her education of sons John and Charles; Thomas Bayes (died 1761), statistician and philosopher; Isaac Watts (died 1748), the "Father of English Hymnody"; and Thomas Newcomen (died 1729), steam engine pioneer.

A hyperlapse video showing the paths around the cemetery

Bunhill Fields Burial Ground is listed Grade I on the Register of Historic Parks and Gardens. It is now maintained by the Friends of City Gardens.

Nearby, on the west side of Bunhill Row and behind the residential tower Braithwaite House, is a former Quaker burial ground, in use from 1661 to 1855, at times also known as Bunhill Fields. George Fox (died 1691), one of the founders of the movement, is among those buried there. Its remains are also a public garden, Quaker Gardens, managed by the London Borough of Islington.

== Historical background ==
Plan of the present Bunhill Fields public gardens (east at the top). Areas in green are fenced, and contain most of the surviving monuments. Areas in yellow and white have been largely cleared of monuments, and are fully accessible to the public.

Bunhill Fields was part of the Manor of Finsbury (originally Fensbury), which has its origins as the prebend of Halliwell and Finsbury, belonging to St Paul's Cathedral and established in 1104. In 1315 the prebendary manor was granted by Archdeacon Robert Baldock to the Mayor and Commonalty of London. This enabled more general public access to the semi-fen or moor stretching from the City of London's boundary (London Wall), to the village of Hoxton.

In 1498 part of the otherwise unenclosed landscape was set aside to form a large field for military exercises of archers and others. This part of the manor has sports and occasional military use: Artillery Ground.

Next to this lies Bunhill Fields. The name derives from "Bone hill", likely linked to occasional burials from at least Saxon times, but more probably derives from the use for mass-deposit for human bones—amounting to over 1,000 cartloads—brought from St Paul's charnel house in 1549 (when that building was demolished). The dried bones were deposited on the moor and capped with a thin layer of soil. This built up a hill across the otherwise damp, flat fens, such that three windmills could safely be erected in a spot that came to be one of the many windmill hills.

== Opening as a burial ground ==
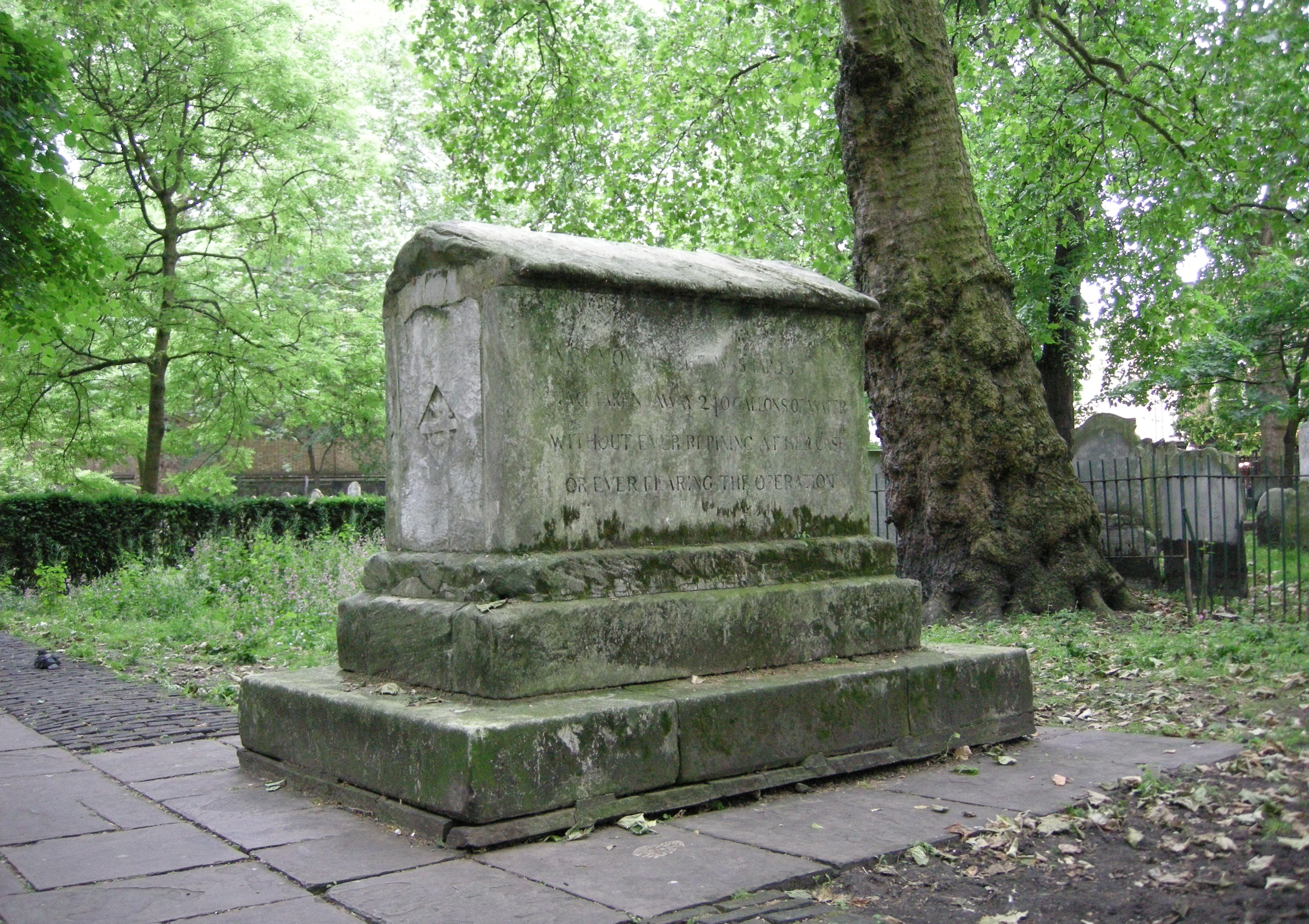
Monument of Dame Mary Page (died 1729). The inscription reads in part: "In 67 months she was tap'd [tapped] 66 times, Had taken away 240 gallons of water without ever repining at her case or ever fearing the operation."

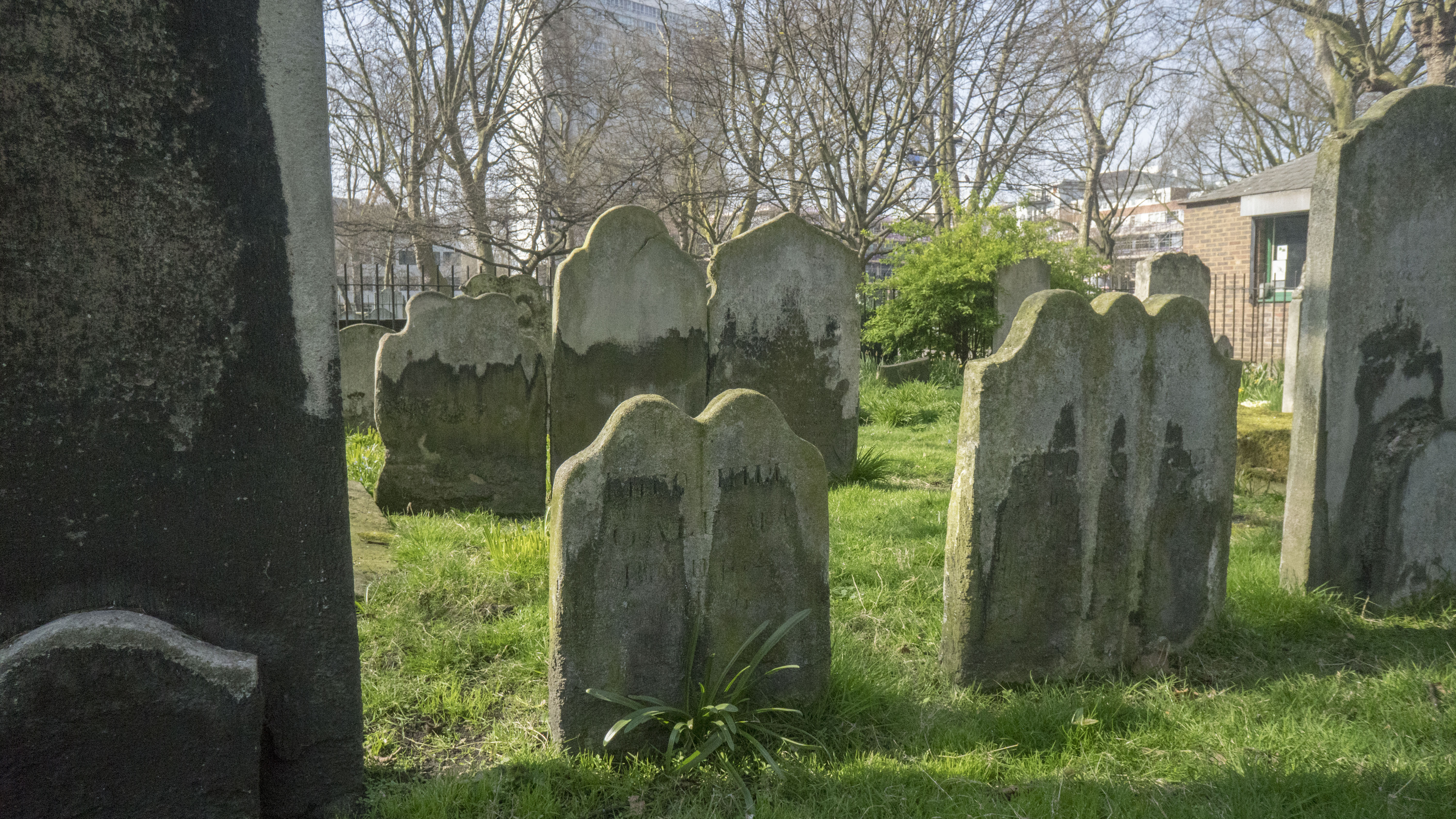
Monument to Theophilus Gale, South Enclosure.

In keeping with this tradition, in 1665 the City of London Corporation decided to use some of the land as a common burial ground for the interment of bodies of inhabitants who had died of the plague and could not be accommodated in the churchyards. Outer walls were completed but Church of England officials never consecrated the ground nor used it for burials. A Mr. Tindal took over the lease.

He allowed extramural graveyard burials in what was unconsecrated soil, thus popular with nonconformists—those Protestant Christians who practised their faiths outside the Church of England; unlike Anglican churchyards it was open for interment to anyone who could afford the fees. It appears on Rocque's Map of London of 1746, and elsewhere, as "Tindal's Burying Ground".

An inscription at the eastern entrance gate to the burial ground reads:

This church-yard was inclosed with a brick wall at the sole charges of the City of London, in the mayoralty of Sir John Lawrence, Knt., Anno Domini 1665; and afterwards the gates thereof were built and finished in the mayoralty of Sir Thomas Bloudworth, Knt., Anno Domini, 1666.

The present gates and inscription date from 1868, but the wording follows that of an original 17th-century inscription at the western entrance, now lost.

The earliest recorded monumental inscription was that to "Grace, daughter of T. Cloudesly, of Leeds. February 1666". The earliest surviving monument is believed to be the headstone to Theophilus Gale: the inscription reads "Theophilus Gale MA / Born 1628 / Died 1678".

In 1769 an act of Parliament, the Prebendary of St. Paul London (Leasing) Act 1769 (9 Geo. 3. c. 61 Pr.), gave the corporation the right to continue the lease for 99 years. The City authorities continued to let the ground to their tenant as a burial ground; in 1781 the corporation decided to take over management of the burial ground.

So many historically important Protestant nonconformists chose this as their place of interment that the 19th-century poet and writer Robert Southey characterised Bunhill Fields in 1830 as the ground "which the Dissenters regard as their Campo Santo". This term was applied to its "daughter", Abney Park Cemetery in Stoke Newington.

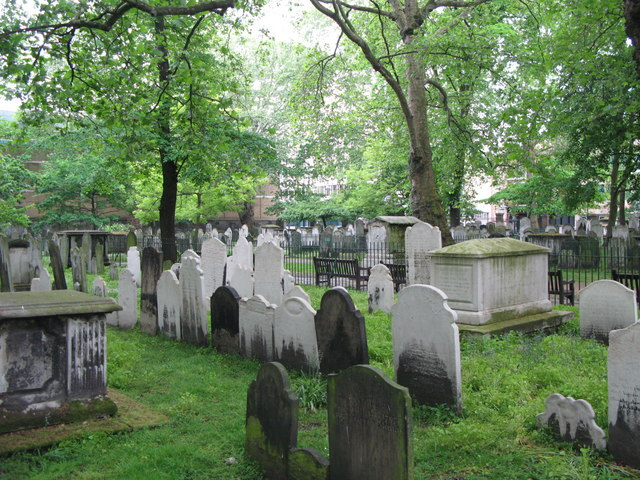
Monuments in Bunhill Fields

== Closure as a burial ground ==
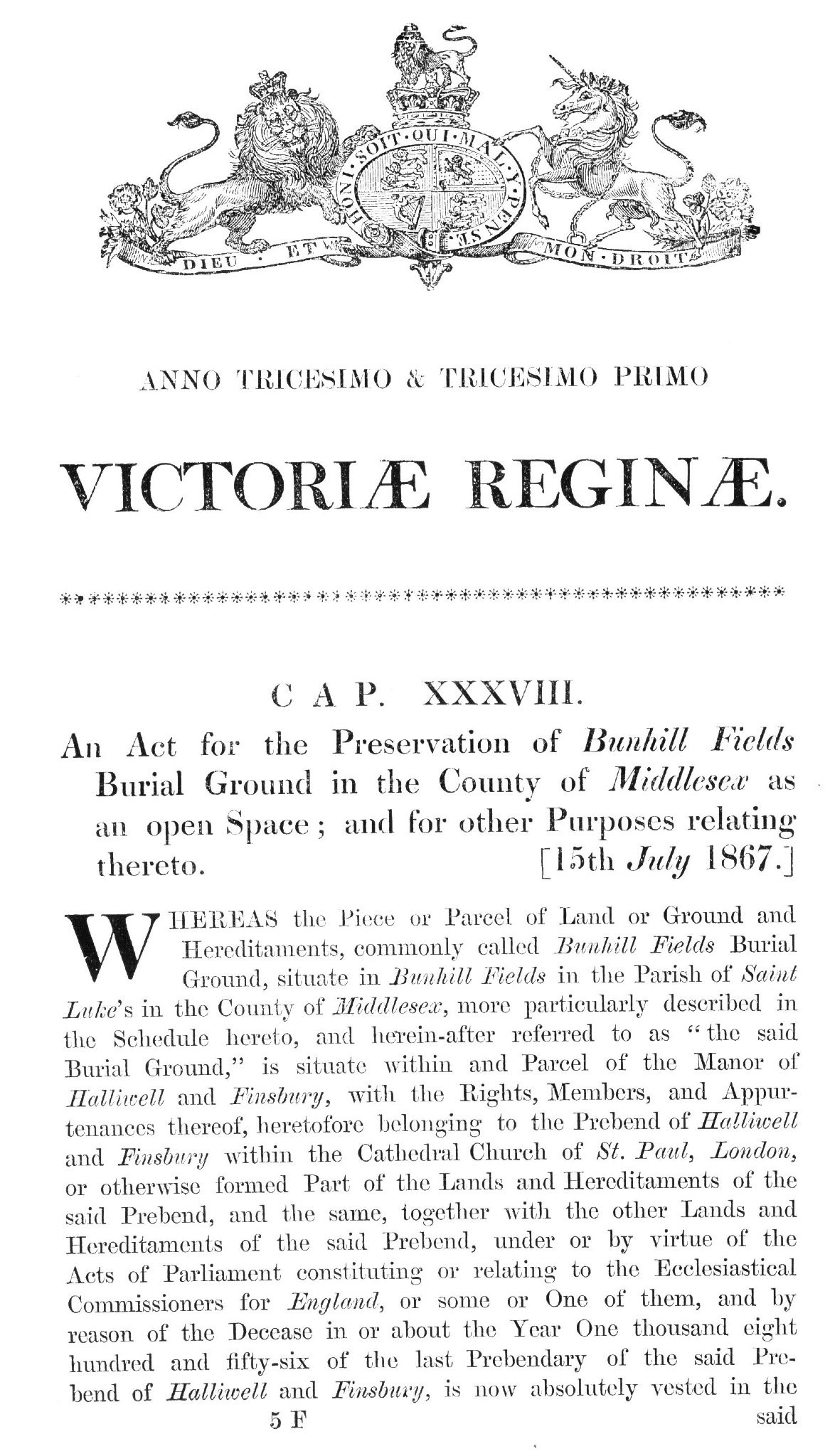
Act of Parliament of 1867 for the Preservation of Bunhill fields as an Open Space

The Burial Act 1852 was passed which enabled grounds to be closed once they became full. An Order for Closure for Bunhill Fields was made in December 1853, and the final burial (that of Elizabeth Howell Oliver) took place on 5 January 1854. Occasional interments continued to be permitted in existing vaults or graves: the final burial of this kind is believed to have been that of a Mrs. Gabriel of Brixton in February 1860. By this date approximately 123,000 interments had taken place in the burial ground.

Two decades before, a group of City nonconformists led by George Collison bought a site for a new landscaped alternative, at part of Abney Park in Stoke Newington. This was named Abney Park Cemetery and opened in 1840. All parts were available for the burial of any person, regardless of religious creed. It preceded Brookwood Cemetery as the prototype of many cemeteries to come nationally with "no invidious dividing lines". It has a unique nondenominational chapel, designed by William Hosking.

== Community garden ==
Crop of Christopher and John Greenwood's 8 inch-to-mile map published in 1827 from an 1830 republication (click to view all).

Upon closure of the Bunhill Fields Burial Ground, its future was uncertain as its lessee, the City of London Corporation, was close to expiry of its lease, scheduled for Christmas 1867. To prevent the land from being redeveloped by the Ecclesiastical Commissioners (who controlled the freehold) at this expiry, the Corporation formed the Special Bunhill Fields Burial Ground Committee in 1865. This became formally known as the Bunhill Fields Preservation Committee.

Appointed by the corporation, it consisted of twelve advisors under the chairmanship of Charles Reed, FSA (son of the Congregational philanthropist Dr. Andrew Reed). He later rose to prominence as the first Member of Parliament (MP) for Hackney and chairman of the first School Board for London before being knighted. Along with his interest in making it into a parkland landscape, he was similarly interested in the wider educational and public benefits of Abney Park Cemetery, of which he was a prominent director.

To corroborate the committee's work, the corporation obtained an act of Parliament, the Bunhill Fields Burial Ground Act 1867 (30 & 31 Vict. c. 38), "for the Preservation of Bunhill Fields Burial Ground ... as an open space". The legislation enabled them to continue to maintain the site when possession would have otherwise reverted to the Ecclesiastical Commissioners, provided it was laid out as a public open space with seating, gardens, and some of its most worthy monuments were restored. The improvements, which included the laying out of walks and paths, cost an estimated £3,500. The new park was opened by the Lord Mayor, James Clarke Lawrence, on 14 October 1869.

The ground was severely damaged by German bombing during World War II; it is believed to have hosted an anti-aircraft gun during the Blitz. In the 1950s, after some debate, the City ordered: to clear the northern third (the projection) of the site of most of its monuments to open it as a public garden; and to preserve and protect the rest behind railings. Legislation in 1960 gave the freehold to the city (the corporation), which continues to maintain the grounds. Landscaping was designed and overseen by the architect and landscape architect Peter Shepheard in 1964–65.

== Bunyan, Defoe and Blake ==
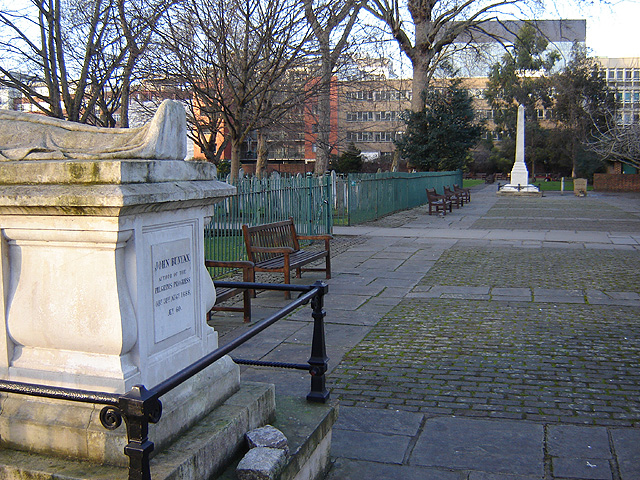
The broadwalk, looking north. John Bunyan's monument is in the foreground, with memorials to Daniel Defoe (obelisk, left) and Willam Blake (headstone, right) in the background.

The best-known monuments are those to the three literary and artistic figures John Bunyan, Daniel Defoe and William Blake. Their graves have long been sites of cultural pilgrimage: Isabella Holmes stated in 1896 that the "most frequented paths" in the burial ground were those leading to the monuments of Bunyan and Defoe. In their present form, all these monuments post-date the closure of the burial ground. Their settings were further radically modified by the landscaping of 1964–65, when a paved north–south "broadwalk" was created in the middle of the burial ground to display them—outside the railed-off areas, accessible to visitors, and cleared of other monuments. Bunyan's monument lies at the broadwalk's southern end, and that to Defoe at its northern end, while Blake's headstone was moved from the site of his grave and repositioned next to Defoe, alongside the headstone to the lesser-known Joseph Swain (died 1796). This arrangement survives, but in 2018 a second monument to Blake was placed on the actual site of his grave.

=== John Bunyan ===
John Bunyan, author of Pilgrim's Progress, died in August 1688. He was initially buried in the "Baptist Corner" at the back of the burial ground, on the understanding that his remains would be moved into the family vault of his friend John Strudwick when that was next opened for a burial. There is no certain evidence as to when (or even if) this was done: the probability, however, is that it occurred when Strudwick himself died in 1695, and certainly Bunyan's name was inscribed on the side of the monument. The Strudwick monument took the form of a large Baroque stone chest. By the 19th century, this had fallen into decay, but in the period following the closure of the burial ground a public appeal for its restoration was launched under the presidency of the 7th Earl of Shaftesbury. This work was completed in May 1862, and comprised a complete reconstruction of the monument, undertaken by the sculptor Edgar George Papworth Senior (1809–1866). Although Papworth retained the basic form of the tomb-chest, he added a recumbent effigy of Bunyan to the top of it, and two relief panels to its sides depicting scenes from Pilgrim's Progress. The monument was further restored in 1928 (the tercentenary of Bunyan's birth), and again after World War II (following serious wartime damage to the effigy's face).

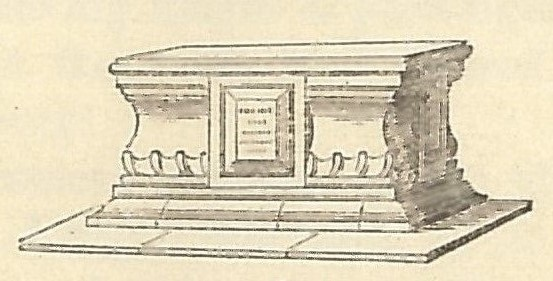
The monument to the Strudwick family and John Bunyan in its original form: an engraving of 1849

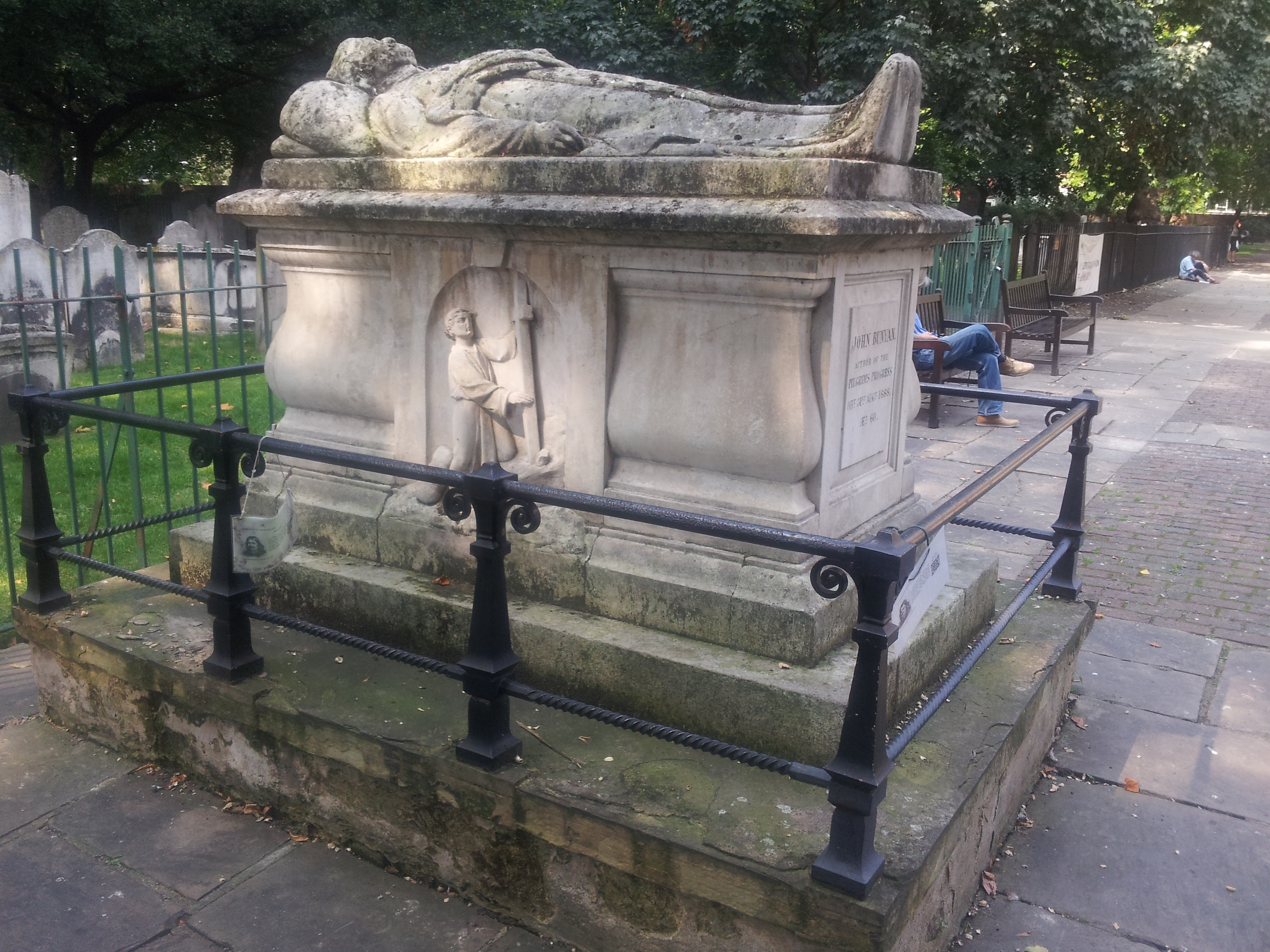
John Bunyan's monument as remodelled in 1862

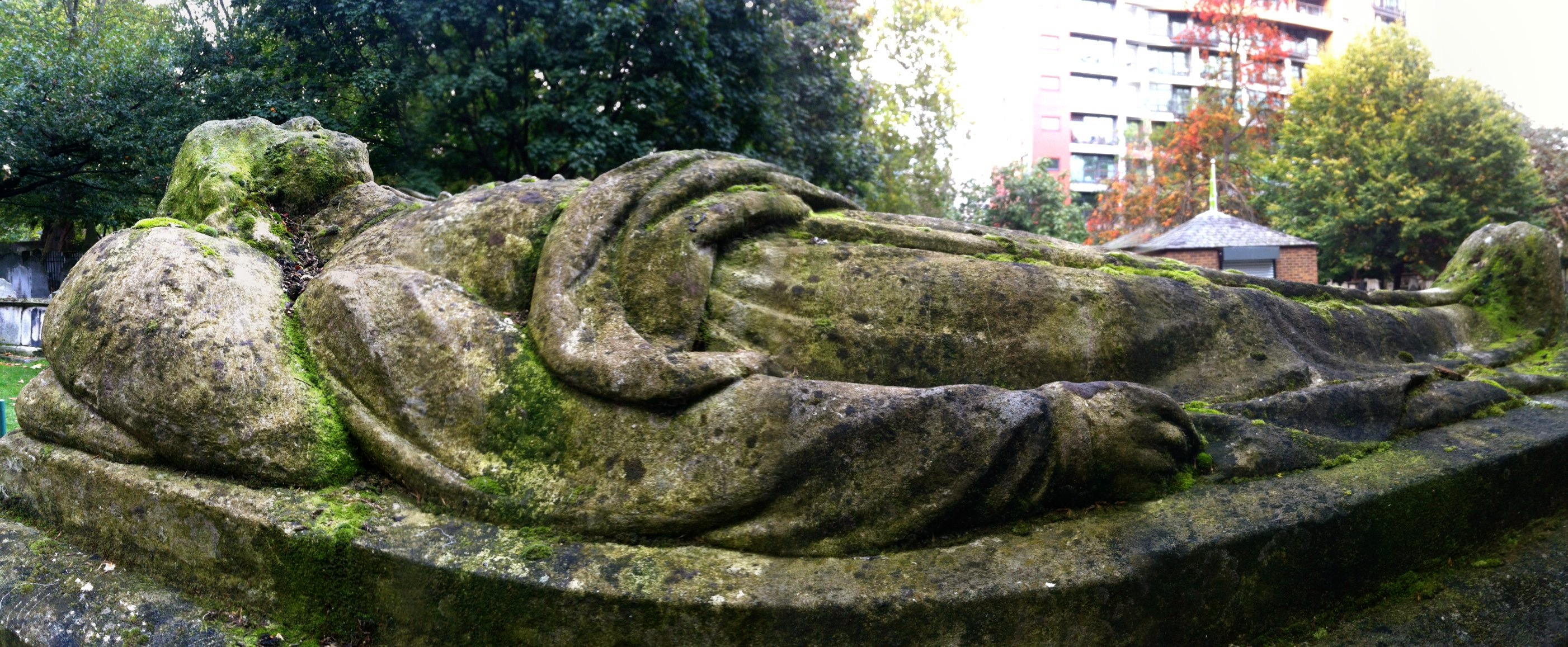
Effigy of John Bunyan

=== Daniel Defoe ===
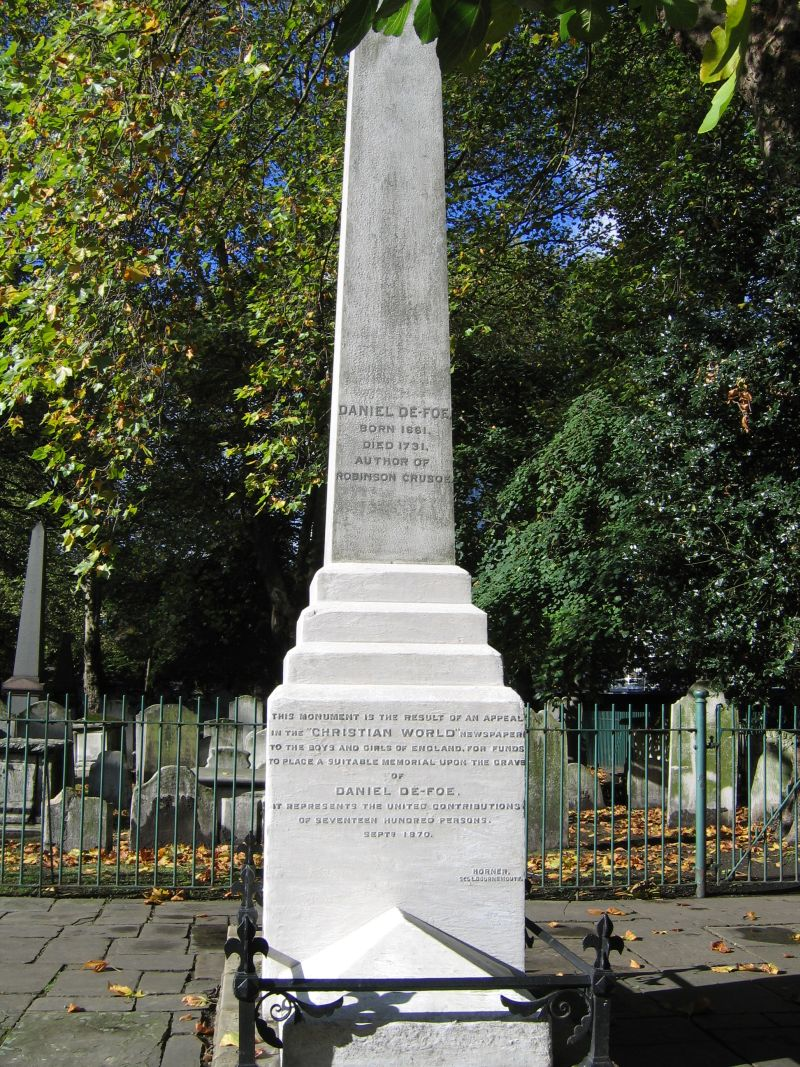
1870 obelisk to Daniel Defoe

Daniel Defoe, author of Robinson Crusoe, died in April 1731 and was buried in Bunhill Fields: his wife, Mary, died in December 1732 and was laid to rest beside him. His daughter-in-law was also buried in the same grave. Defoe died in poverty, and the grave was marked with a simple headstone. In the winter of 1857/8 – at a time when the burial ground was closed and neglected—the grave was struck by lightning and the headstone broken. In 1869, James Clarke, editor of the Christian World children's newspaper, launched an appeal for subscriptions to place a more suitable memorial on the grave. He encouraged his readers to make donations of sixpence each; and to stimulate enthusiasm opened two lists, one for boys and one for girls, to encourage a spirit of competition between them. Many adults also made donations. In the end, some 1,700 subscriptions raised a total of about £200. A design for a marble obelisk (or "Cleopatric pillar") was commissioned from C. C. Creeke; and the sculptor Samuel Horner of Bournemouth was commissioned to execute it. In late 1869, when the foundations were being dug, skeletons were disinterred, and there was an unseemly rush for souvenirs by the crowd of onlookers: the police had to be called before calm was restored. The monument was unveiled at a ceremony attended by three of Defoe's great-granddaughters on 16 September 1870.

=== William Blake ===
William Blake died in August 1827 and was buried in the northern part of the burial ground. His wife, Catherine Sophia, died in October 1831 and was buried in a separate grave on the south side of the ground. By the 20th century, Blake's grave was in disrepair; and in 1927, for the centenary of his death and at a time when his reputation was on the rise, a new headstone was commissioned. As it had been decided to commemorate both William and Catherine, despite the fact that the headstone would stand at some distance from Catherine's grave, the inscription was phrased as "Near by lie the remains of ...". When Bunhill Fields was relandscaped in the 1960s, Blake's grave lay in the area that was to be cleared of monuments. The headstone was therefore moved approximately 20 metres (yards) to its present location, next to the monument to Daniel Defoe. It was also rotated through 90°, so that it now faces south rather than west. Joseph Swain's headstone was added to the grouping at the same time, although that faces west. Flowers, coins and other tokens are regularly left by visitors to Blake's headstone.

In 2006–07, members of the group The Friends of William Blake established the original location of his grave, and proposed placing a new memorial there. In the form of a ledger stone, with lettering by Lida Cardozo Kindersley, this was finally unveiled on 12 August 2018 by Philip Pullman, President of the Blake Society.

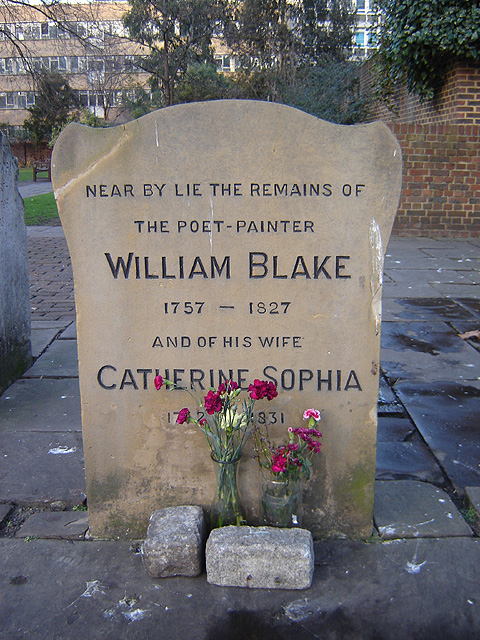
1927 headstone to William and Catherine Sophia Blake

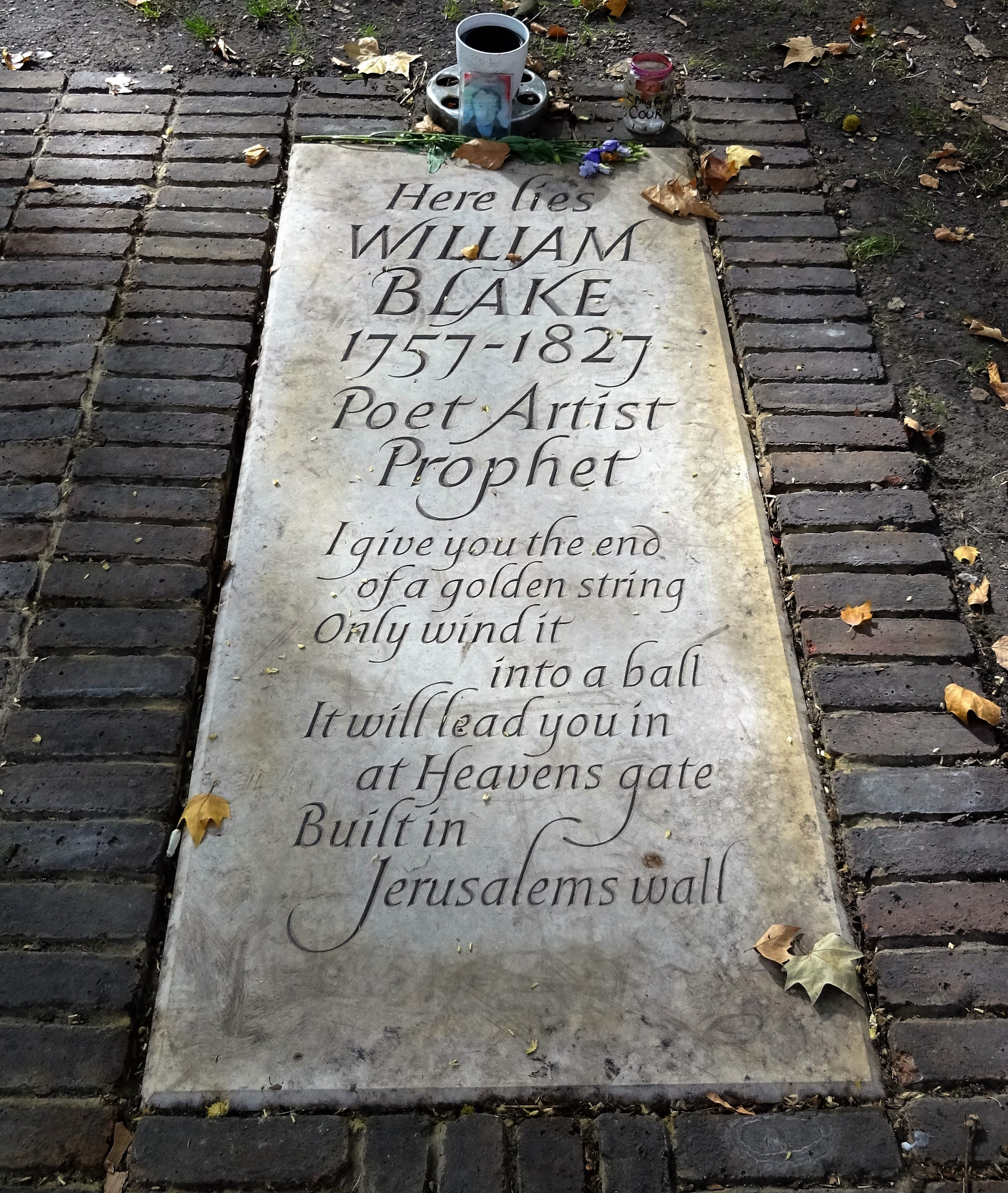
2018 ledger stone on William Blake's grave

== Records ==
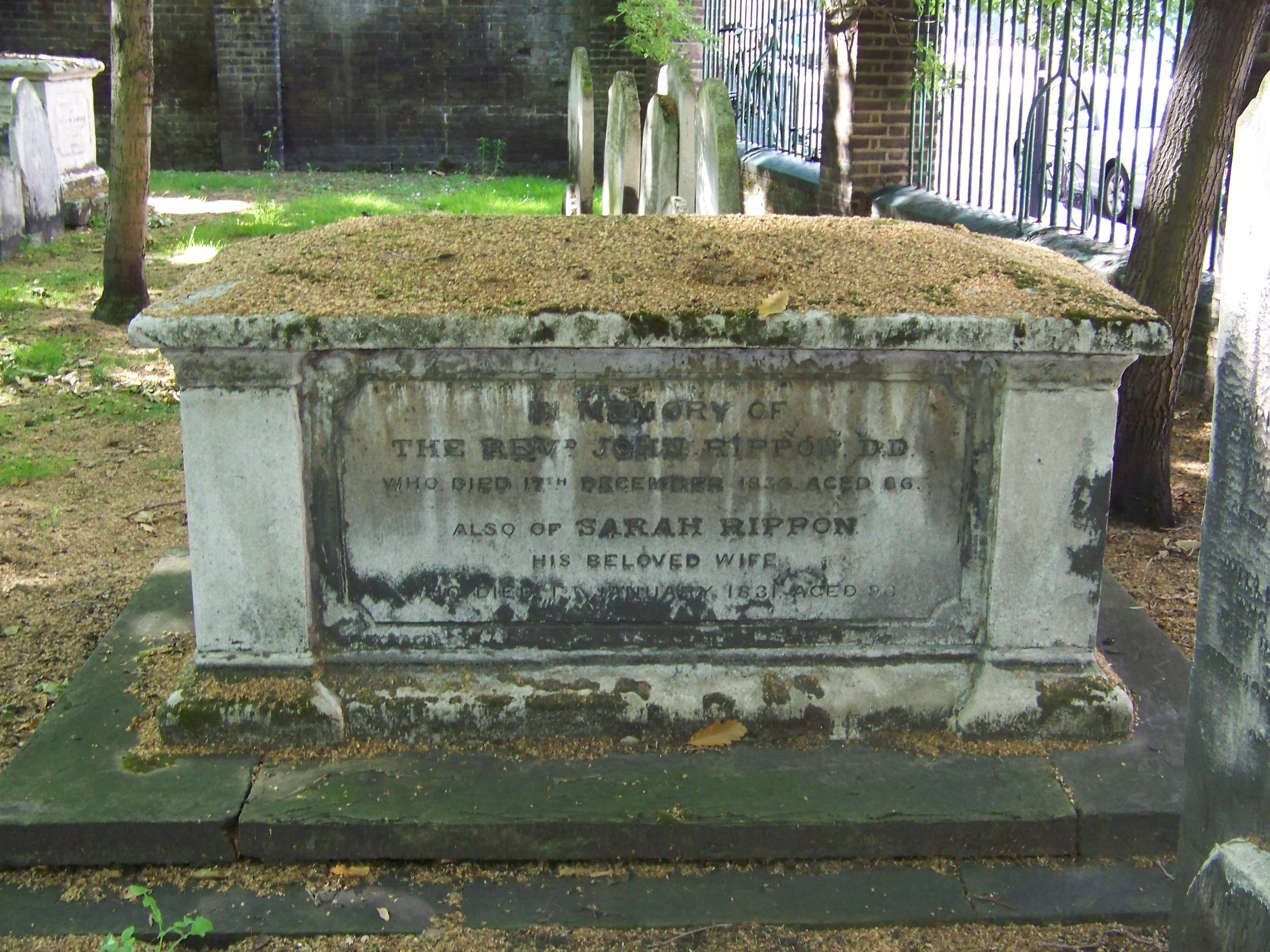
Tomb of John Rippon (died 1836)

Burial ground registers, from 1713 to 1854, are held at The National Archives at Kew. Other records, including interment order books dating from 1789 to 1854, and a list of the legible monument/headstone inscriptions in 1869, are held at The London Archives.

Baptist minister John Rippon—who was himself buried at the site in 1836—made transcripts of its monumental inscriptions in the late 18th and early 19th centuries, some copied while "laying on his side". In 1803 he issued a prospectus for a six-volume publication on Bunhill Fields, but this never came to fruition. The British Library now holds 14 manuscript volumes of his transcripts; a further six volumes are held in the College of Arms.

== Notable graves ==
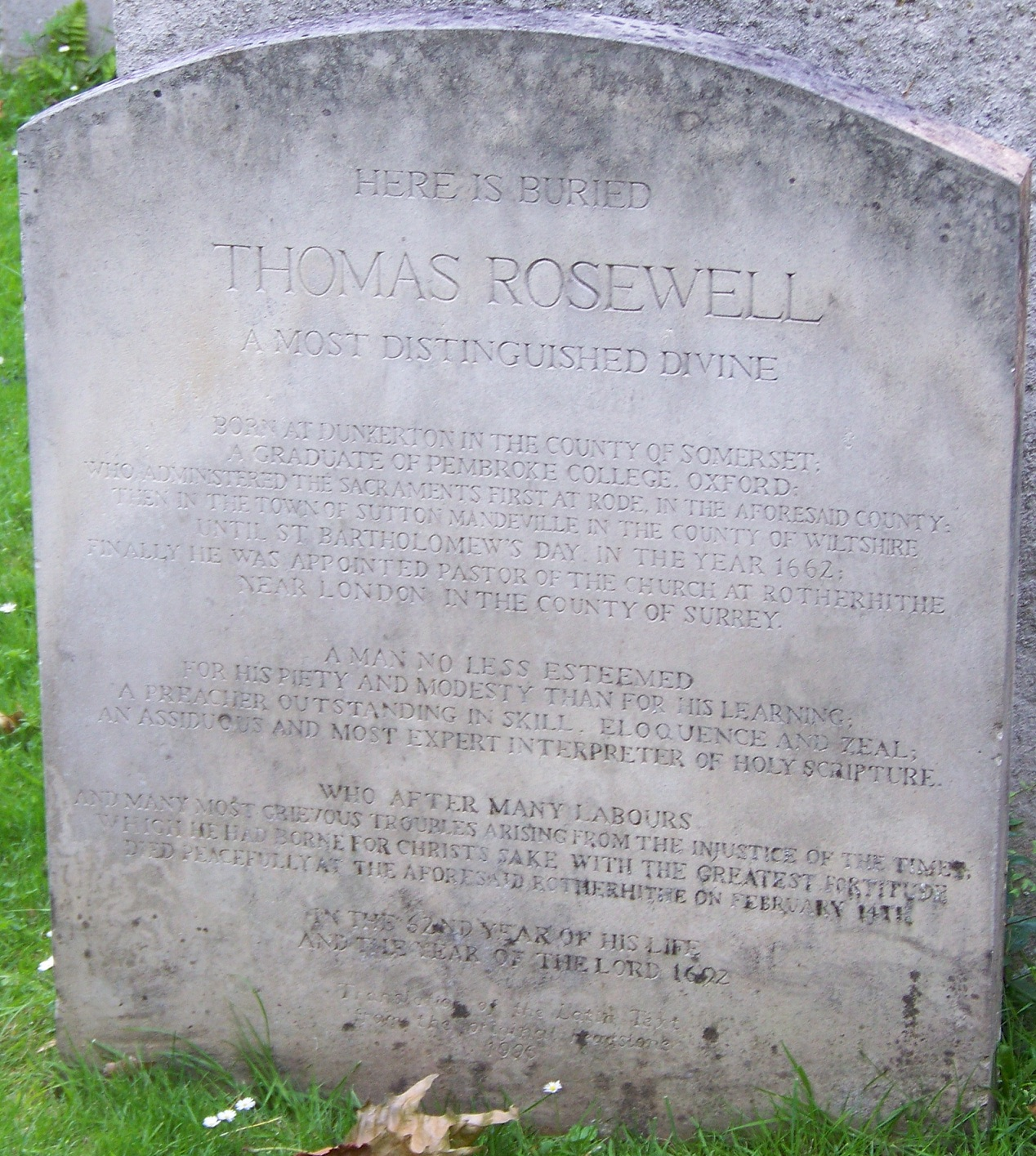
Headstone to Thomas Rosewell (died 1692), nonconformist minister. The original inscription was in Latin, but was replaced with this English version in the 20th century.

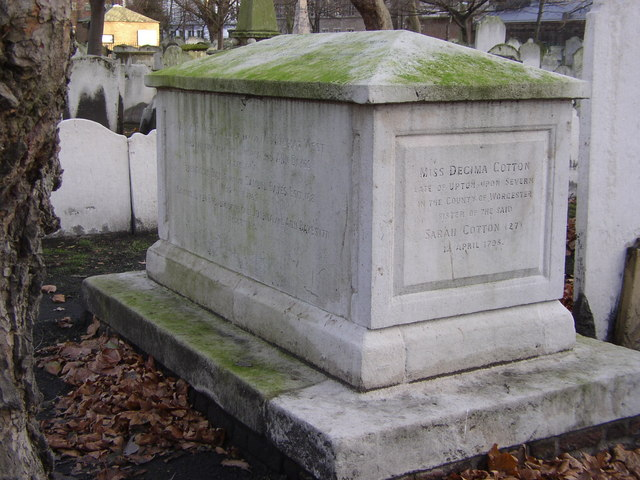
Monument to members of the Bayes and Cotton families, including Joshua Bayes (died 1746) and his son Thomas Bayes (died 1761)

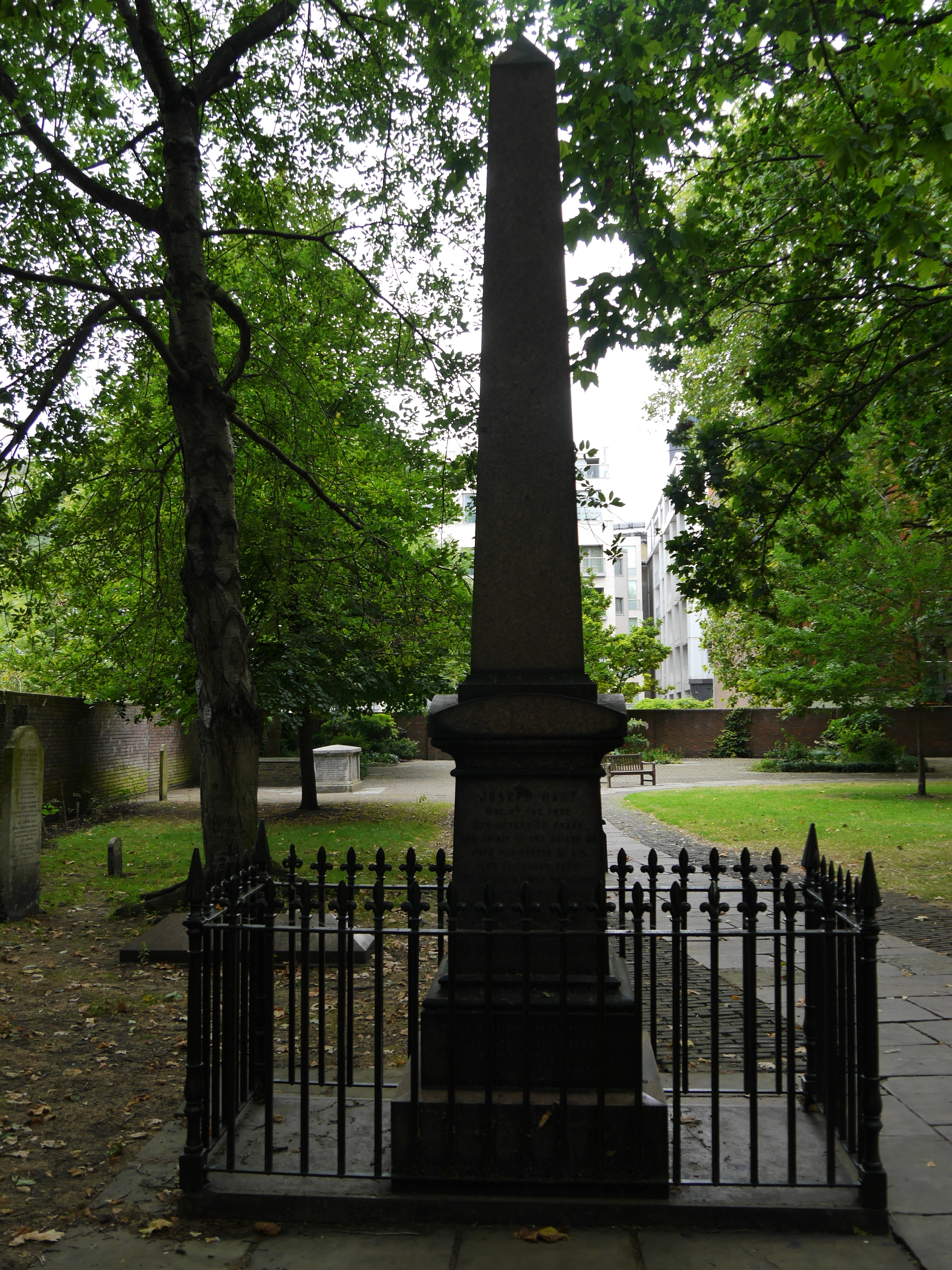
Monument to the hymn writer and Calvinist minister Joseph Hart (died 1768)

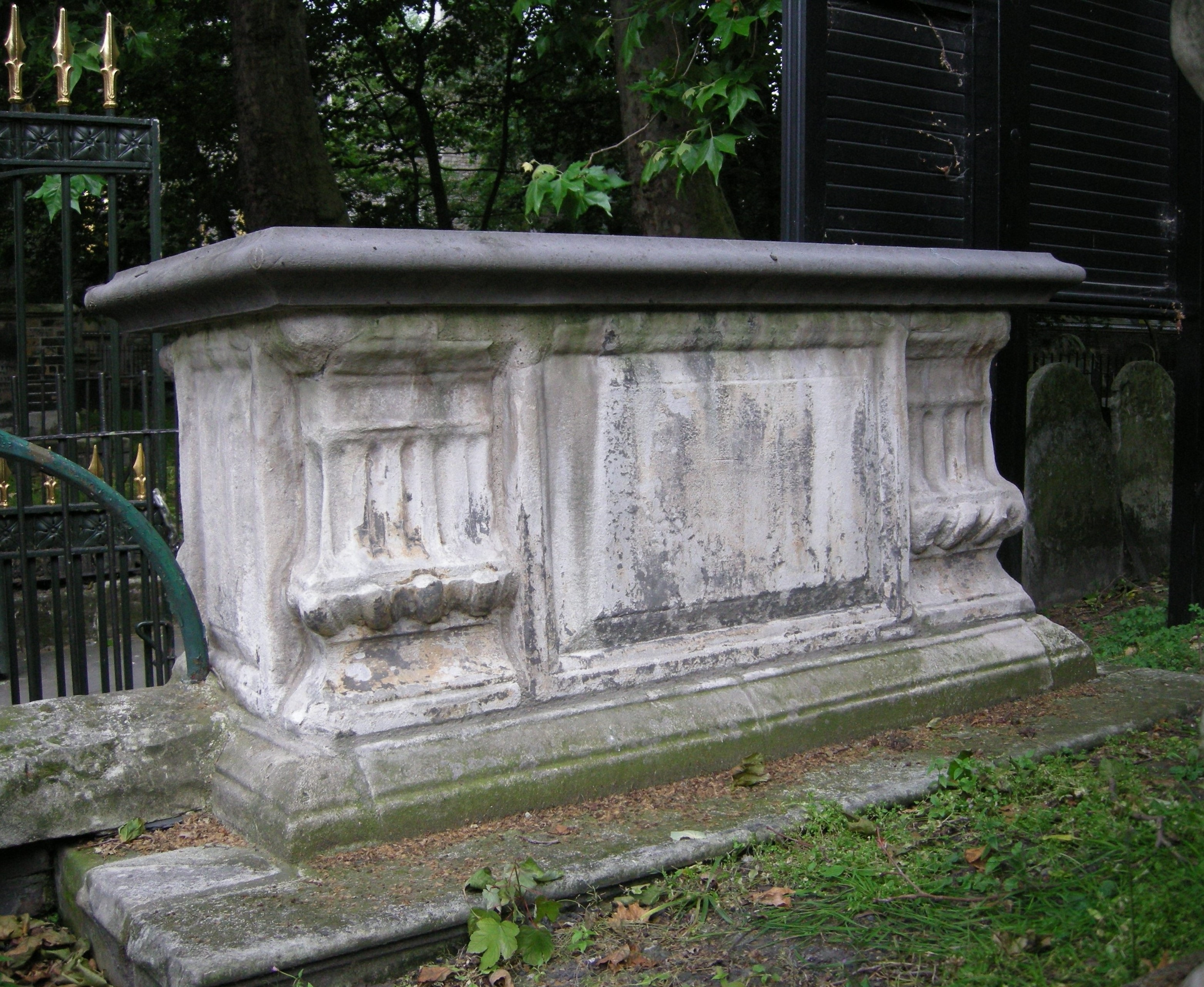
Tomb of Richard Price (died 1791), moral philosopher and nonconformist preacher, and his wife Sarah (died 1786)

Tomb of Isaac Watts (died 1748), "Father of English Hymnody"

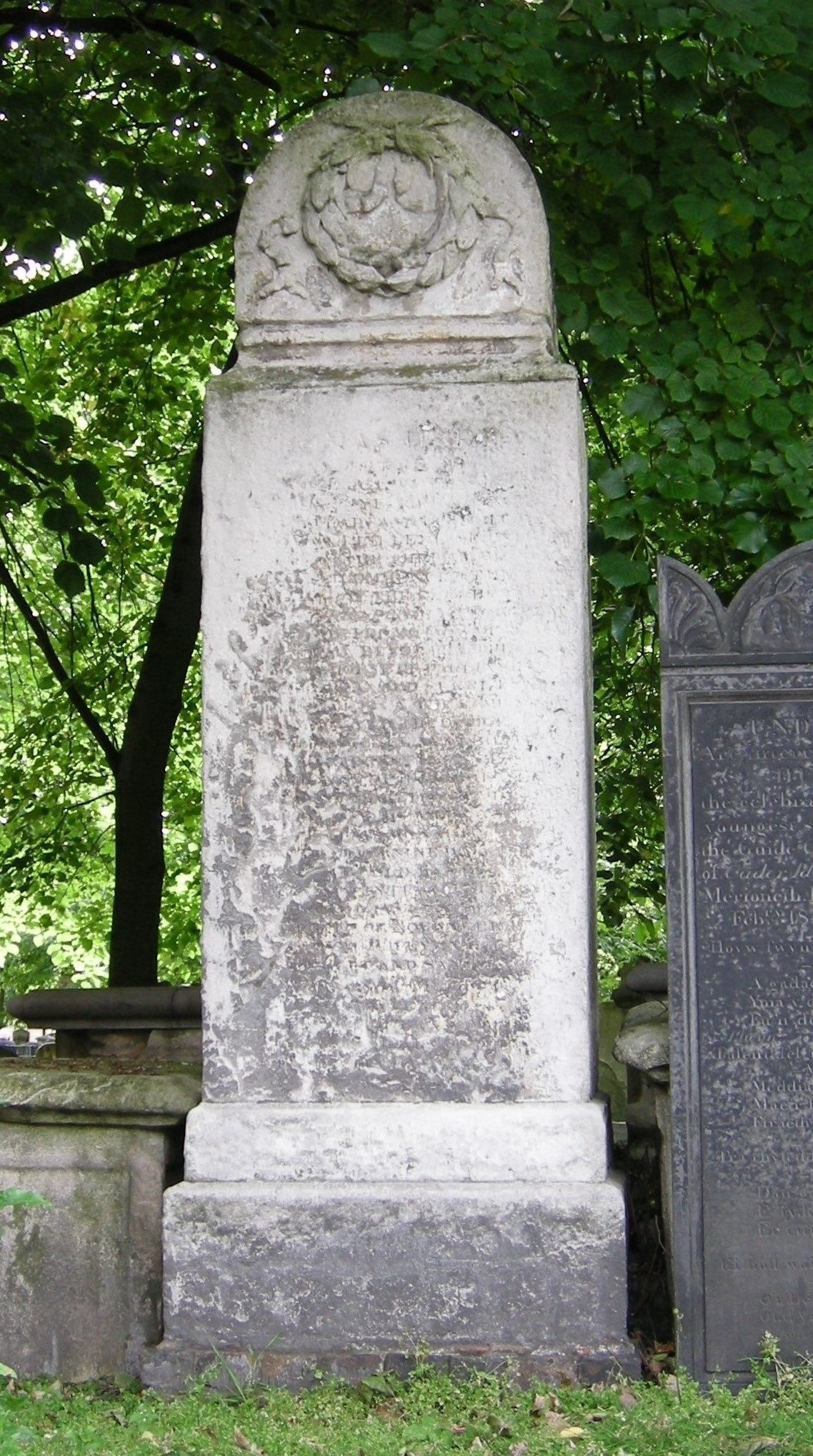
Monument to the radical reformer Thomas Hardy (died 1832), designed by J. W. Papworth

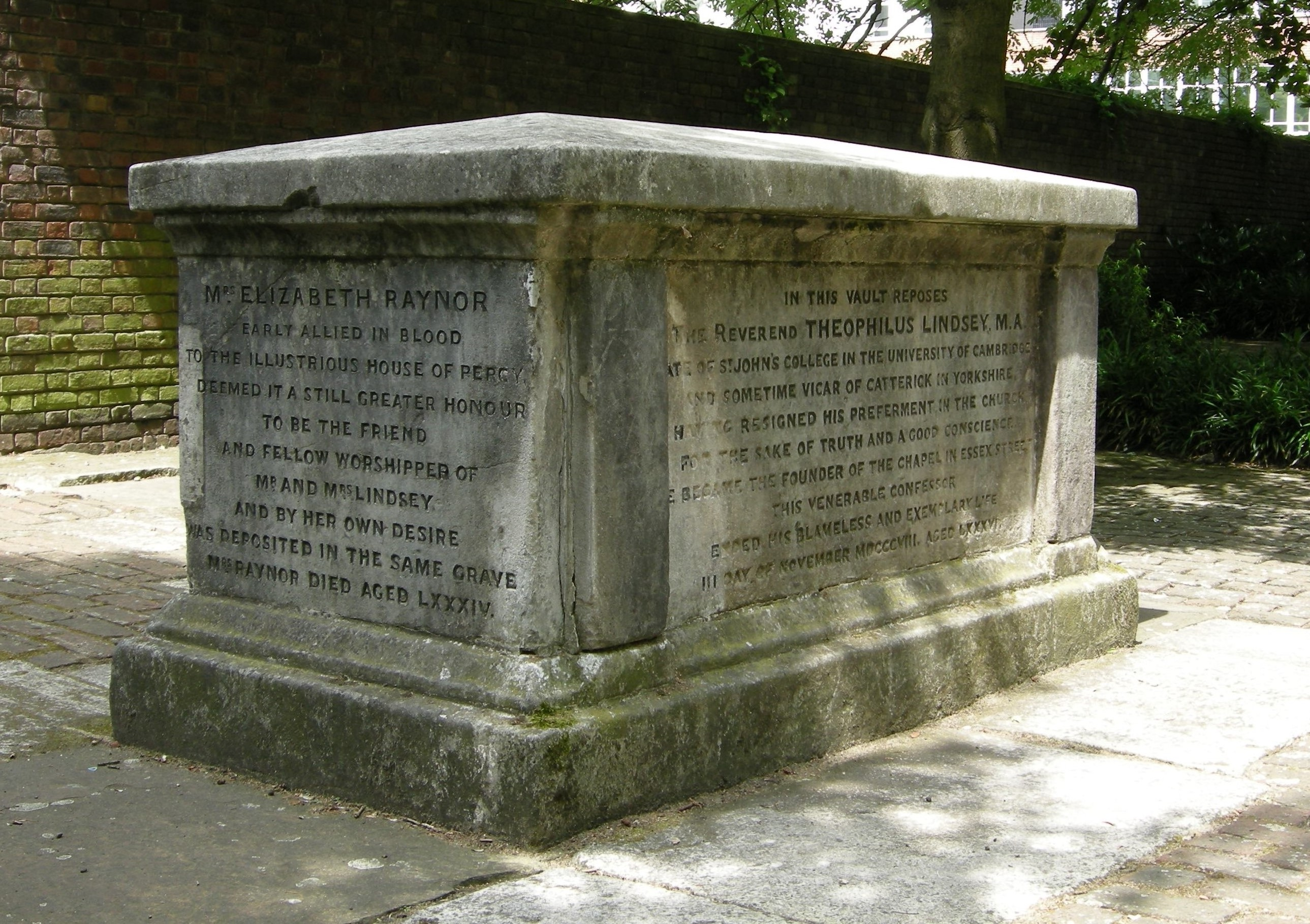
Tomb of the Unitarians Theophilus Lindsey (died 1808), Elizabeth Rayner (died 1800) and Thomas Belsham (died 1829)

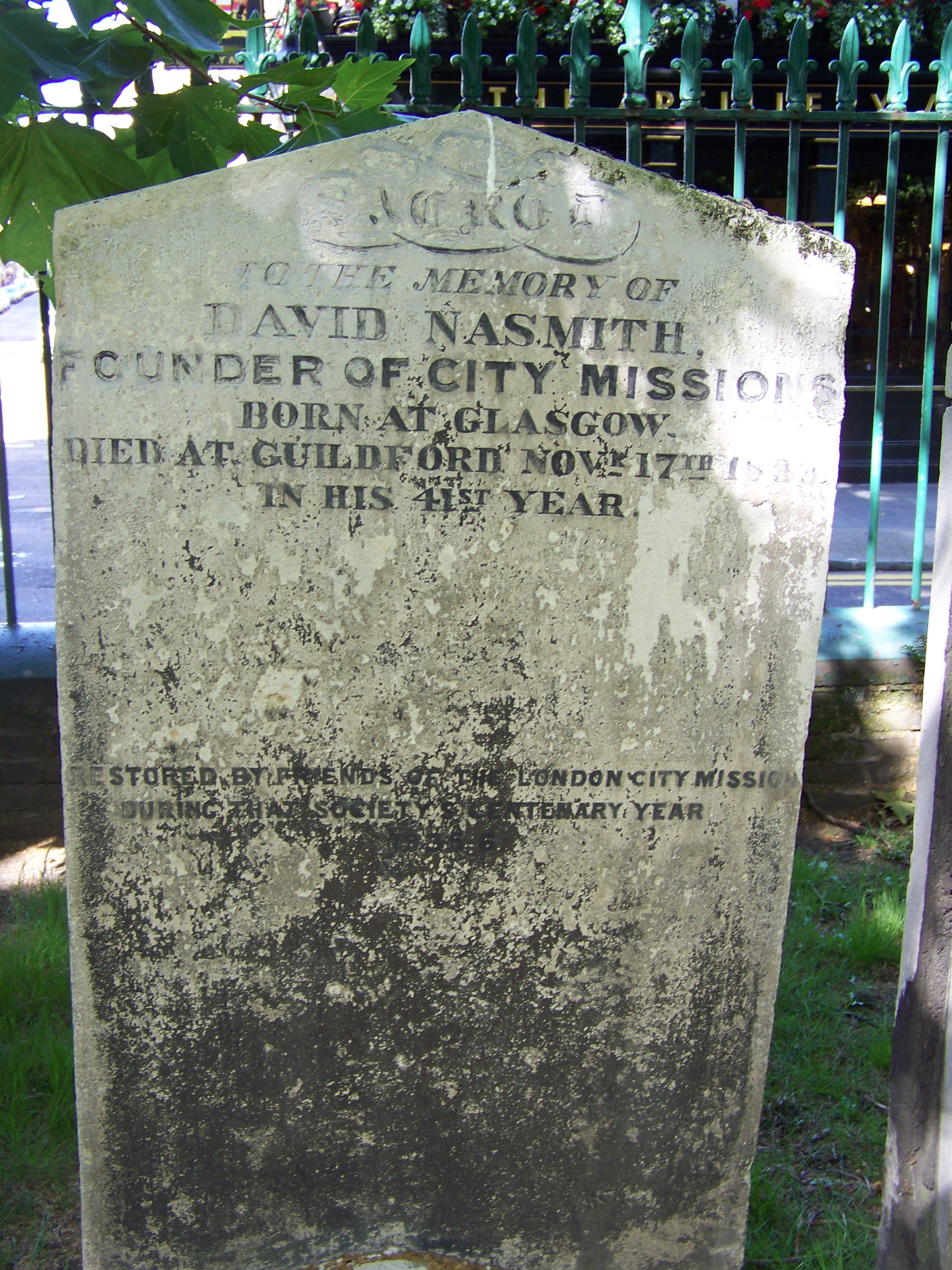
Monument to David Nasmith (died 1839), founder of the City Mission Movement

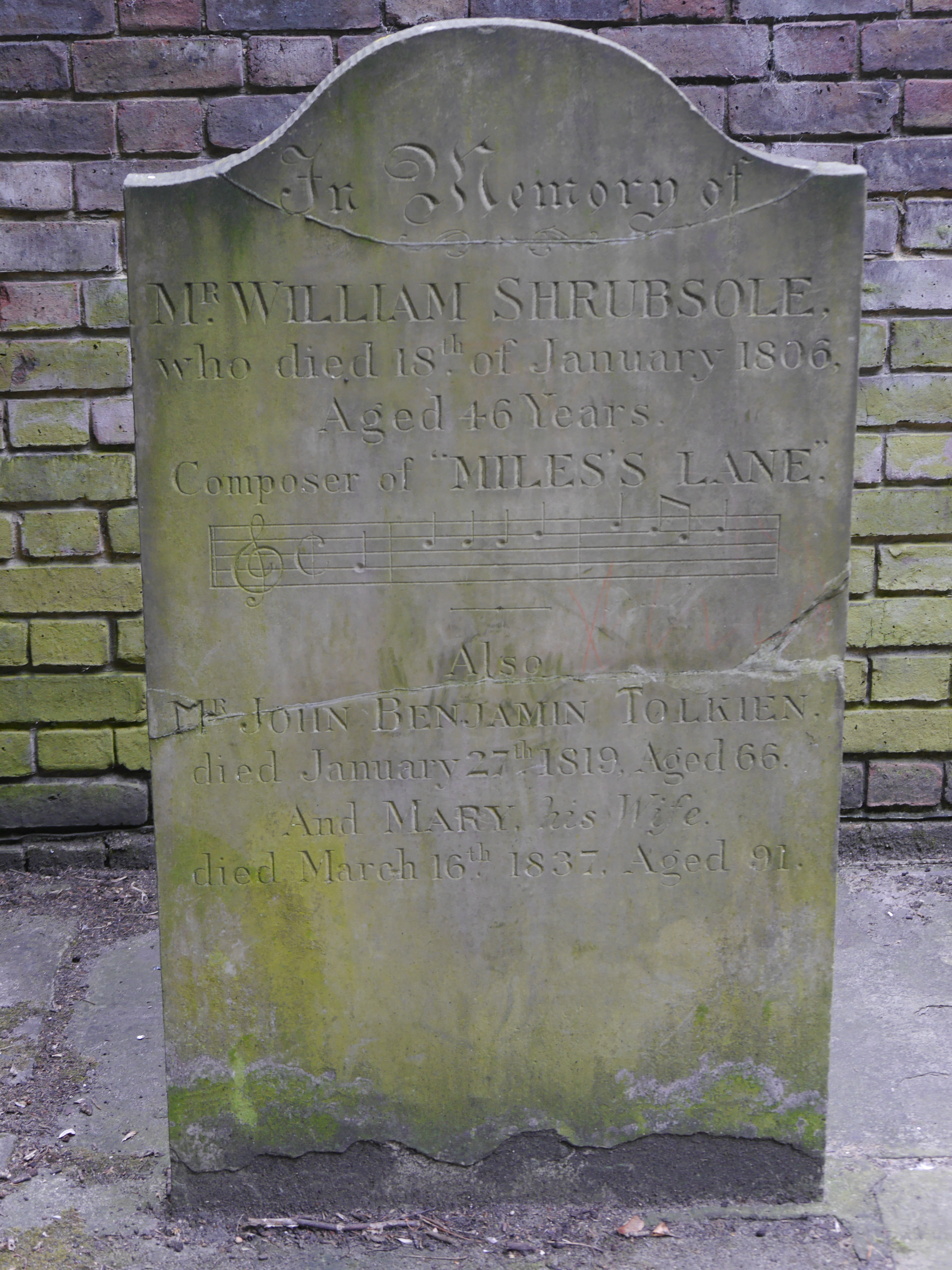
Headstone for William Shrubsole (died 1806), musician and composer, with John Benjamin Tolkien (died 1819) and Mary Tolkien (died 1837)

Notable burials include:

=== 17th century ===
- Thomas Brand (1635–1691), nonconformist minister and divine
- John Bunyan (1628–1688), author of The Pilgrim's Progress
- Thomas Cole (1628–1697), Independent minister
- John Faldo (1633–1690), nonconformist minister and controversialist
- Lt. Gen. Charles Fleetwood (c. 1618–1692), fought on the Parliamentarian side in the English Civil War, served as Lord Deputy of Ireland 1652–55, and married Bridget, eldest daughter of Oliver Cromwell
- Theophilus Gale (1628–1678), nonconformist minister, educationalist and theologian
- Thomas Goodwin (1600–1680), Puritan theologian and preacher
- William Hooke or Hook (1600–1677), Puritan clergyman
- Francis Howell (1625–1679), Principal of Jesus College, Oxford, from 1657 to 1660
- William Jenkyn (1613–1685), nonconformist minister, imprisoned during the Interregnum
- Hanserd Knollys (1599–1691), Particular Baptist minister
- Nathaniel Mather (1631–1697), Independent minister
- John Owen (1616–1683), Puritan divine, theologian, academic administrator and statesman
- Vavasor Powell (1617–1670), Welsh Puritan preacher and vicar of Dartford, Kent, Parliamentary Army chaplain, "church planter" sent out by the Westminster Assembly, and writer
- Thomas Rosewell (1630–1692), nonconformist minister of Rotherhithe
- John Rowe (1626–1677), nonconformist minister
- Nathaniel Vincent (c. 1639–1697), nonconformist minister

=== 18th century ===
- James Adair (c. 1743–1798), judge and serjeant-at-law
- Stephen Addington (1729–1796), dissenting clergyman and teacher
- William Aldridge (1737–1797), nonconformist minister
- Thomas Amory (1701–1774), dissenting minister, tutor and poet
- John Asty (c. 1672–1730), dissenting clergyman
- Joshua Bayes (1671–1746), nonconformist minister
- Thomas Bayes (1702–1761), mathematician, clergyman, and friend of Richard Price
- William Blackburn (1750–1790), architect and surveyor
- Thomas Bradbury (1677–1759), congregational minister
- John Brine (1703–1765), Particular Baptist minister
- Thomas Fowell Buxton (1758–1795), father of namesake Thomas Fowell Buxton, anti-slavery philanthropist
- Samuel Chandler (1693–1766), nonconformist minister
- John Conder (1714–1781), President of Homerton College
- James Coningham (1670–1716), presbyterian divine and tutor
- Thomas Cotton (1653–1730), dissenting minister
- Cromwell family: two tombs commemorate various 18th-century members of this family, including Hannah Cromwell née Hewling (1653–1732), widow of Major Henry Cromwell (1658–1711), the grandson of Oliver Cromwell; together with several of the couple's children and grandchildren. (Major Cromwell himself died and was buried in Lisbon.)
- Daniel Defoe (1661–1731), author of Robinson Crusoe
- Thomas Doolittle (c. 1632–1707), nonconformist minister, tutor and author
- John Eames (died 1744), dissenting tutor
- Thomas Emlyn (1663–1741), nonconformist divine
- John Evans (c. 1680–1730), Welsh presbyterian minister and historian
- John Fell (1735–1797), congregationalist minister and classical tutor
- Caleb Fleming (1698–1779), dissenting minister and polemicist
- Roger Flexman (1708–1795), presbyterian minister, historical scholar and bibliographer
- James Foster (1697–1753), Baptist minister and author of Essay on Fundamentals, one of the first nonconformist texts
- Philip Furneaux (1726–1783), Independent minister
- Thomas Gibbons (1720–1785), nonconformist minister, hymn writer and poet
- Andrew Gifford (1700–1784), Baptist minister and numismatist
- John Gill (1697–1771), Baptist pastor, biblical scholar, and Calvinist theologian, author of the Exposition of the Bible and the Body of Divinity
- John Guyse (1680–1761), Independent minister
- Charles Hamilton (c. 1753–1792), orientalist, known for his English translation of Al-Hidayah
- William Harris (c. 1675–1740), presbyterian minister
- Joseph Hart (1712–1768), hymn writer and Calvinist minister in London
- William Kiffin (1616–1701), Baptist minister and wool-merchant
- Andrew Kippis (1725–1795), nonconformist clergyman and biographer
- Nathaniel Lardner (1684–1768), theologian
- Theophilus Lobb (1678–1763), physician, and medical and religious writer
- John Macgowan (1726–1780), Scottish Baptist minister and author
- Paul Henry Maty (1744–1787), British Museum librarian
- Henry Miles (1698–1763), dissenting minister and scientific writer
- Roger Morrice (1628–1702), Puritan minister and political journalist
- Daniel Neal (1678–1743), Independent minister and historian of Puritanism
- Christopher Ness (1621–1705), Independent minister and theological author
- Thomas Newcomen (1663–1729), steam engine pioneer (exact site of burial unknown)
- Joshua Oldfield (1656–1729), presbyterian divine
- William Orme (1787–1830), Scottish Congregational minister and biographer
- Dame Mary Page (1672–1729), wife of Sir Gregory Page, 1st Baronet
- Edward Pickard (1714–1778), dissenting minister
- Richard Price (1723–1791), founder of life insurance principles
- Elizabeth Rayner (1714–1800), Unitarian benefactress
- Benjamin Robinson (1666–1724), Presbyterian minister and theologian
- Samuel Rosewell (1679–1722), Presbyterian minister
- Thomas Rowe (1657–1705), nonconformist minister
- Samuel Morton Savage (1721–1791), nonconformist minister and dissenting tutor
- Samuel Say (1676–1743), dissenting minister
- Samuel Stennett (1727–1795), Seventh Day Baptist minister and hymnwriter
- Joseph Swain (1761–1796), Baptist minister, poet and hymnwriter
- Isaac Watts (1674–1748), hymn writer ("Joy to the World"; "When I Survey the Wondrous Cross"), theologian and logician
- Susanna Wesley (1669–1742), mother of John Wesley, founder of Methodism and Charles Wesley, hymn writer
- Daniel Williams (1643–1716), theologian and founder of Dr Williams's Library

=== 19th century ===
- Thomas Belsham (1750–1829), Unitarian minister
- Catherine Blake (1762–1831), wife of William Blake
- William Blake (1757–1827), painter, engraver, poet, and mystic
- David Bradberry (1736–1803), nonconformist minister
- John Bradford (1750–1805), dissenting minister
- Charles Buck (1771–1815), Independent minister and theological writer, known for his Theological Dictionary
- George Burder (1752–1832), nonconformist divine
- John Clayton (1754–1843), Independent minister
- Eleanor Coade (1733–1821), pioneer of the artificial stone known as Coade stone
- Thomas Dale (1729–1816), physician
- Joseph Denison (c. 1726–1806), banker
- Daniel Fisher (1731–1807), dissenting minister
- Joseph Hardcastle (1752–1819), one of the founders of the Missionary Society
- Thomas Hardy (1752–1832), political reformer and founder of the London Corresponding Society
- Thomas Heaphy the elder (1775–1835), watercolourist and portrait-painter
- Jabez Carter Hornblower (1744–1814), steam engine pioneer
- Henry Hunter (1741–1802), Scottish minister and translator
- John Hyatt (1767–1826), one of the founding preachers of Calvinist Methodism at Whitefield's Tabernacle, Tottenham Court Road 1806–1828.
- Joseph Ivimey (1773–1834), Particular Baptist minister and historian
- William Jones (1762–1846), Welsh Baptist religious writer and bookseller
- John Le Keux (1783–1846), English engraver
- Theophilus Lindsey (1723–1808), a founder of Unitarianism
- John Martin (1741–1820), Particular Baptist minister
- David Nasmith (1799–1839), founder of the City Mission Movement
- Joseph Nightingale (1775–1824), writer and preacher
- William Orme (1787–1830), Scottish Congregational minister and biographer
- Apsley Pellatt (1763–1826), glass manufacturer
- Timothy Priestley (1734–1814), Independent minister, and scientific collaborator with his brother Joseph Priestley
- Thomas Pringle (1789–1834), Scottish poet and author, and Secretary to the Anti-Slavery Society (re-interred 1970, Eildon Church, Baviaans valley, South Africa)
- Abraham Rees (1743–1825), Welsh nonconformist minister and compiler of Rees's Cyclopædia
- John Rippon (1750–1836), Baptist clergyman, composer of many well known hymns
- Richard "Conversation" Sharp (1759–1835), prominent among the Dissenters' "Deputies", critic, merchant and MP
- William Shrubsole (1760–1806), singer and composer
- Thomas Stothard (1755–1834), painter, illustrator and engraver
- Charles Taylor (1756–1823), engraver and biblical scholar
- John Towers (c. 1747–1804), Independent minister
- George Walker (c. 1734–1807), dissenter, mathematician, theologian, and Fellow of the Royal Society
- James Ware (1756–1815), eye surgeon and Fellow of the Royal Society
- Rev. Alexander Waugh (1754–1827), co-founder of the London Missionary Society and forebear of Alec Waugh and Evelyn Waugh
- Hugh Worthington (1752–1813), dissenting minister
