= John Hyatt =

John Hyatt may refer to:

- John Hyatt (clergyman) (1767–1826), English Wesleyan clergyman
- John Wesley Hyatt (1837–1920), American inventor
- John Hyatt (musician) (died 2023), British musician

== See also ==
- John Hiatt (born 1952), American musician, singer and songwriter
