= Asty (disambiguation) =

Asty is an ancient Greek term for a city; most often used for the city of Athens, as opposed to the rest of Attica.

The name can also refer to:

- To Asty, Greek newspaper published in Athens
- Asty Tokushima, conference venue in Tokushima, Japan
- John Asty (c. 1672 – 1730), English clergyman
