= Joseph Hardcastle (1752–1819) =

English merchant and first treasurer of the London Missionary Society

- Born: 7 December, 1752; Leeds
- Died: 3 March 1818 (aged 65); Hatcham House, Deptford
- Burial place: Bunhill Fields, London
- Occupation: British missionary
- Notable work: The Missionary Society

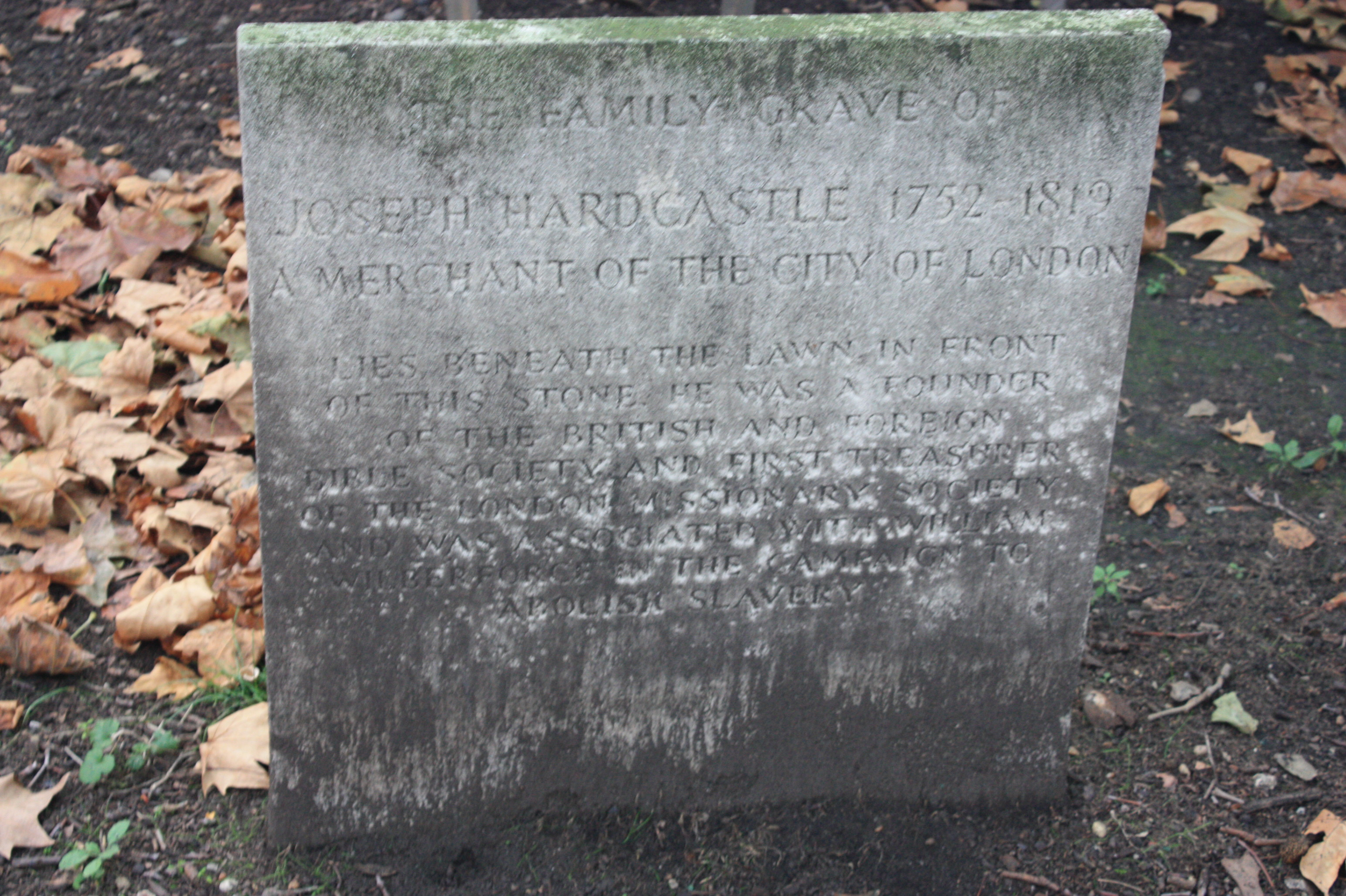
Joseph Hardcastle's grave, Bunhill Fields, London

Joseph Hardcastle (1752–1819) was an English merchant. One of the founders of the Missionary Society, later the London Missionary Society, he devoted time and money to its affairs, becoming its first treasurer.

== Life ==
Hardcastle was born in Leeds, where he lived until the age of 15, at which point he moved to London to join his uncle's business. He eventually became a merchant, still based in London, and was a director of the Sierra Leone Company. During his time in London he lived at Old Swan Stairs, before moving to Hatcham House in Deptford, then a rural Surrey village, in what is now the New Cross Gate area of Lewisham.

Thomas Clarkson the slavery abolitionist was a frequent guest at Hatcham House. Here Clarkson wrote much of his History of the Abolition of the Slave Trade, and met his future wife, a niece of Mrs Hardcastle. Joseph Hardcastle was especially active in arranging missionary expeditions to Africa, and created schemes through which missionary work could be self-funding by the sale artefacts brought back by the missionaries.

Hardcastle is buried in Bunhill Fields non-conformist cemetery, in London. The grave is in the north section of the T-plan, close to the red granite obelisk to Joseph Hart.

== Legacy ==
The story of Joseph's life was published in "Memoir of Joseph Hardcastle Esq., the first Treasurer of the London Missionary Society: A Record of the Past for his Descendants", which was written by his last surviving daughter, Emma Corsbie Hardcastle, and published in 1860. A number of roads in the modern New Cross Gate reflect his time, most notably Joseph Hardcastle Close.

== Family ==
Hardcastle married in 1777 Anne Corsbie, daughter of John Corsbie of Bury St Edmunds. They had nine children, two dying young, with three sons and four daughters becoming adults. They included:

- Anne (died 1827), the eldest daughter, who married in 1810 Henry Forster Burder.
- Mrs Arnould (Elizabeth, died 1827), mother of Anne Elizabeth Hardcastle Arnould, who married the Rev. Henry Olivier and was grandmother of Laurence Olivier.
- Alfred (1797–1841), second son, married firstly Anne Cobb Hurry (1789–1815); Joseph Alfred Hardcastle, MP, was their son. He married secondly Emma Smith, in 1820.
- Emma Corsbie (1800–1867), youngest daughter, who married in 1822 Alexander Haldane (1800–1882).

The other children were Selina, Joseph and Nathaniel.
