= Joseph Swain (poet) =

British Baptist minister, poet and hymnwriter (1761-1796)

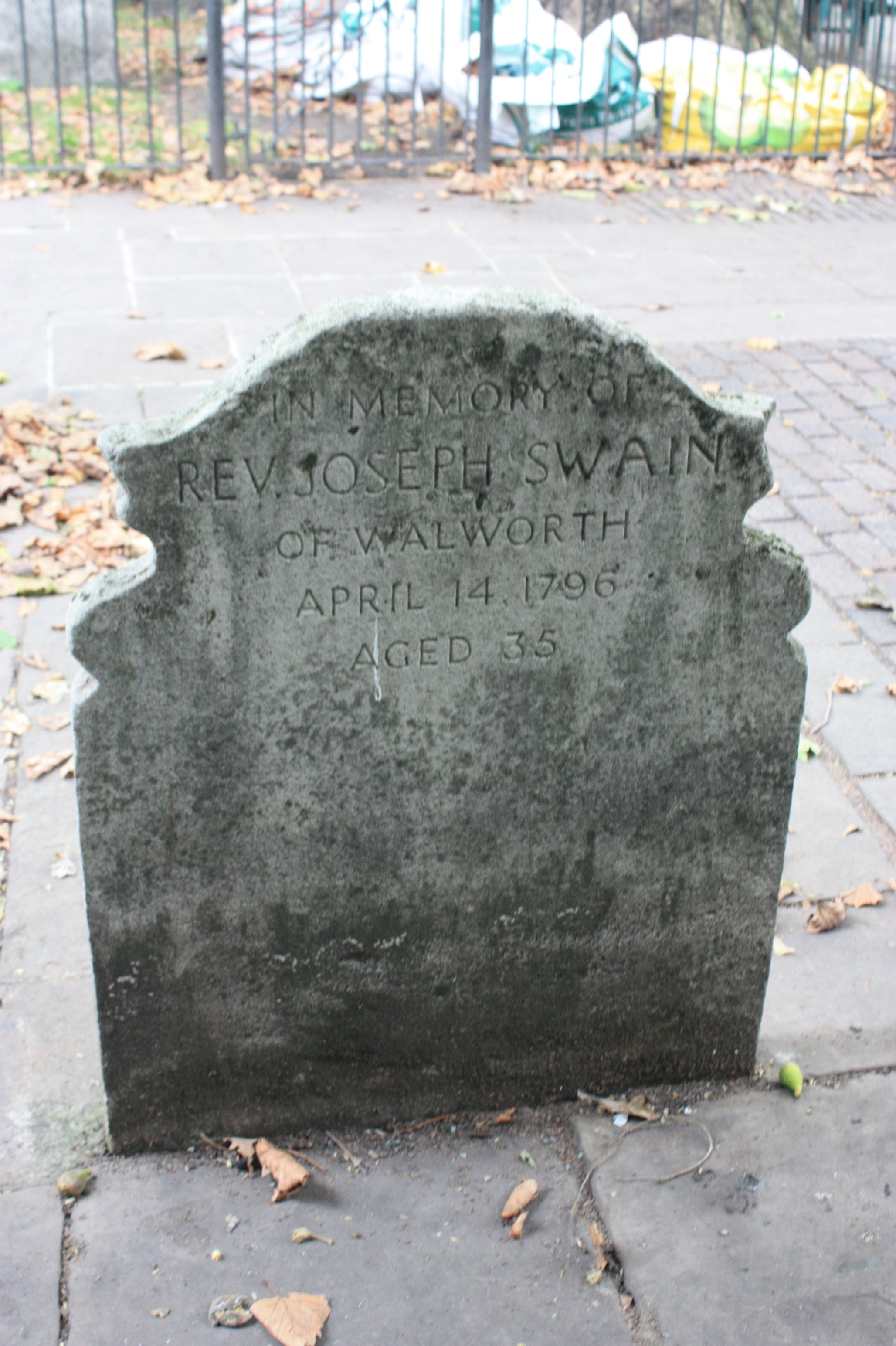
Headstone of Joseph Swain, Bunhill Fields, London

Joseph Swain (1761 – 14 April 1796) was a British Baptist minister, poet and hymnwriter. Born in Birmingham, and orphaned at an early age, he was apprenticed as an engraver in Birmingham and afterwards in London.

He experienced a religious conversion in 1782, and was baptised by John Rippon in the Baptist meeting-house in Carter Lane, Tooley Street, Southwark, on 11 May 1783. He subsequently became a Baptist minister and pastor of East Street Baptist church in Walworth from 1792 until his death in 1796. He was a popular preacher. During the period of his ministry it became necessary to extend the church building on three occasions.

== Publications ==
He was also a writer of devotional poems and hymns, many of which remained popular through the 19th century, although now largely forgotten. Many were published under the collective title Walworth Hymns in 1792. Other publications include;

- A collection of poems on several occasions. London, 1781
- Redemption, A Poem in Five Books. London, 1789
- Experimental Essays on Divine Subjects. London, 1781
- A pocket companion and directory. London, 1794

A version of his hymn "My Song in the Night" was included on the album Come, Thou Fount of Every Blessing released by the Tabernacle Choir at Temple Square in 2009.

== Death and legacy ==
Swain died aged 35 on 14 April 1796. He was buried in Bunhill Fields burial ground in London. His headstone, recovered from its original site following bomb damage in World War II, is now located in the paved "broadwalk" in the middle of the burial ground, next to the obelisk to Daniel Defoe and the headstone to William Blake.

One of his grandsons was the engraver Joseph Swain.

== Sources ==
- Carlyle, E. I.; Briggs, J. H. Y. (revised) (2004). "Swain, Joseph (1761–1796)". Oxford Dictionary of National Biography (online ed.). Oxford University Press. doi:10.1093/ref:odnb/26811. (Subscription, Wikipedia Library access or UK public library membership required.)
- Jones, J. A., ed. (1849). Bunhill Memorials: sacred reminiscences of three hundred ministers and other persons of note, who are buried in Bunhill Fields, of every denomination. London: James Paul. pp. 268–73.
