= John Guyse =

English independent minister

John Guyse (1680-1761) was an English independent minister.

== Life ==
Guyse was born in Hertford in 1680. He was educated for the ministry at the academy of the Rev. John Payne at Saffron Walden, and began to preach in his twentieth year. He sometimes assisted William Haworth, then minister of a congregation of dissenters in Hertford, and succeeded him in the charge 27 September 1705. His ministry at Hertford was distinguished by the vigour of his attacks on Arianism.

In 1727 he was invited to become first minister of a congregation which had been formed by a secession from Miles Lane, Cannon Street, and had established itself in New Broad Street. Being advised to leave Hertford, as his health was overtaxed, he complied with the request. From about 1728 he preached the Coward lecture on Fridays at Little St. Helen's, and from 1734 the Merchants' lecture on Tuesdays at Pinners' Hall.

Guyse received the degree of D.D. from Aberdeen in 1733 (Gent. Mag. iii. 48). He was an active member of the King's Head Society, which was formed for the purpose of assisting young men to obtain academical training for the ministry. In his old age he became lame and blind, but his blindness was thought to have improved his sermons by compelling him to preach without notes, so that it was said that one of his congregation told him she wished he had become blind twenty years earlier. His only son, William Guyse, was his assistant at New Broad Street from 1728 till his death in 1758. He himself died on 22 November 1761, and was buried in Bunhill Fields burial ground.

== Works ==
Two Coward lectures, which he published in 1729 under the title of 'Christ the Son of God,' were attacked by Samuel Chandler in 'A Letter to the Rev. John Guyse.' Guyse replied with 'The Scripture Notion of preaching Christ further cleared and vindicated in a letter to the Rev. Mr. Samuel Chandler,' 1730. Chandler then wrote 'A Second Letter' to Guyse, which the latter answered in an appendix to a 'Sermon on the Death of John Asty.' A complaint against him seems to have been the fact that he had accused ministers generally of not preaching Christ. The disputants treated each other badly, but were afterwards reconciled.

Besides the works mentioned above he wrote the following:

- 'Jesus Christ God-Man, several sermons,' 1719.
- 'A Sermon on the Plague of Marseilles,' 1720.
- 'The Holy Spirit a Divine Person, several sermons,' 1721.
- 'The Standing Use of the Scripture, several sermons,' 1724.
- 'Remarks on a Catechism' (written by James Strong of Ilminster).
- 'A Present Remembrance of God.' 1730.
- Nine sermons in the Berry Street collection.
- 'Youth's Monitor, six annual sermons,' 1736.
- 'An Exposition of the New Testament in the form of a paraphrase,' 3 vols. 1739–52.
- With Isaac Watts, the preface to Jonathan Edwards' A Faithful Narrative of the Surprising Work of God in the Conversion of Many Hundred Souls in Northampton 1737.
- 'A Collection of Seventeen Practical Sermons, to which is added an exhortation' (all originally published separately), 1756.

== Influence ==
John Wesley stated in the Preface to his Notes on the New Testament that he was indebted to Dr. Guyse for many 'useful observations'.
