= Thomas Dale (physician) =

British physician

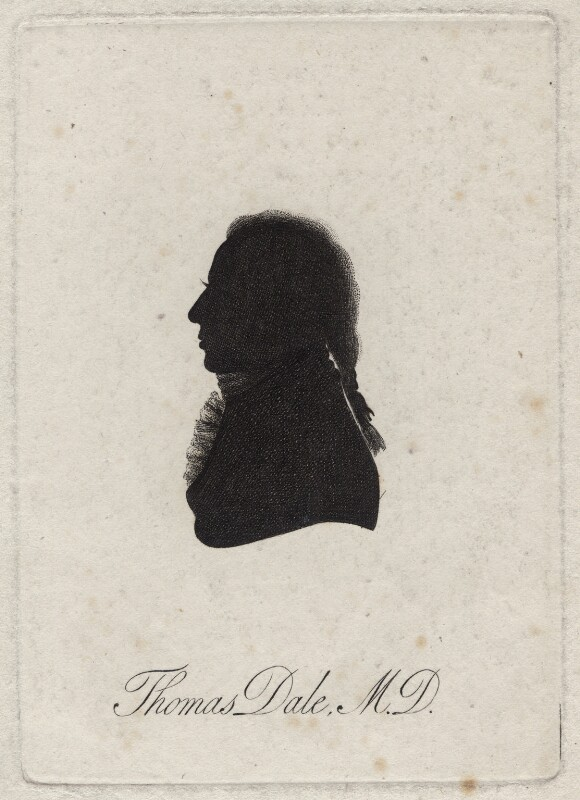
- Dale by John Miers
- Born: 1729; Charlestown, South Carolina
- Died: 21 February 1816 (aged 86–87); England
- Occupation: Physician

Thomas Dale (1729 – 21 February 1816) was a British-American physician.

== Biography ==
Dale was the son of Dr. Thomas Dale, of Charlestown, South Carolina, who was a justice of the peace and a member of the upper house of assembly, who seems to have been nephew to Samuel Dale of Braintree. He was born in 1729 at Charlestown, but came to England at an early age and entered St. Paul's School. Proceeding to the university of Edinburgh about 1770, he took the degree of M.D. on 12 June 1775, his dissertation being on erysipelas. He became a licentiate of the Royal College of Physicians in 1786, and subsequently practised in the city of London. A good linguist and classical scholar, he was one of the originators of the Literary Fund, and from 1790 he acted for many years as registrar to the society. He died at his house in Devonshire Square, Bishopsgate, on 21 February 1816, and was buried in Bunhill Fields.

== See also ==
- Thomas Dale House
