= Come, Thou Fount of Every Blessing (album) =

Studio album by Tabernacle Choir at Temple Square
- Released: March 2009
- Length: 75:53
- Producer: Mack Wilberg

Come, Thou Fount of Every Blessing is a religious album released by the Tabernacle Choir at Temple Square. It reached number one on the Billboard Top Classical Crossover Album chart. The album includes two solos by Alex Boye.

== Track listing ==
No.	Title	Writer(s)	Length
1.	"Saints Bound for Heaven"	William Walker, words; music arranged by Mack Wilberg	2:53
2.	"My Song in the Night"	Joseph Swain, words, ad.; music arranged by Mack Wilberg	4:39
3.	"We'll Shout and Give Him Glory"	Wilberg	3:59
4.	"His Voice as the Sound"	Swain	5:29
5.	"How Bright is the Day"	S.B. Sawyer	3:18
6.	"Death Shall Not Destroy My Comfort"	Wilberg	7:19
7.	"My God, My Portion, and My Love"	Isaac Watts	5:30
8.	"Bound for the Promised Land"	Samuel Stennett	2:44
9.	"I Want Jesus to Walk with Me"	Moses Hogan	3:54
10.	"Old Time Religion"	Hogan, adapted by Benjamin Harlan	3:06
11.	"The Battle of Jericho"	Hogan	2:39
12.	"Deep River"	Wilberg	4:35
13.	"Down to the River to Pray"	Wilberg	3:58
14.	"Rock-a-My Soul in the Bosom of Abraham"	Howard A. Roberts	3:07
15.	"Softly and Tenderly"	Will L. Thompson	5:55
16.	"Amazing Grace"	John Newton	6:25
17.	"Come, Thou Fount of Every Blessing"	Robert Robinson	6:09
Total length:			75:53
