= Hugh Worthington =

British clergyman (1752-1813)

- Born: 21 June 1752
- Died: 26 July 1813 (aged 61)
- Resting place: Bunhill Fields
- Education: Daventry Academy
- Occupations: Academic and clergy
- Years active: Late-18th century – early-19th century

Hugh Worthington (21 June 1752 – 26 July 1813) was a British Arian divine. He was born in Leicester and studied at the Daventry Academy under Caleb Ashworth. Worthington was a pastor at Salters' Hall, London, from 1782; a trustee of Dr Daniel Williams's foundations, 1785; and was a lecturer on classics and logic from 1786 to 1789. He published sermons and other writings.

He died on 26 July 1813 and was buried in Bunhill Fields burial ground.

== See also ==
- List of English writers
- List of logicians
- List of people from London
- List of religious studies scholars
