= John Martin (minister) =

English Particular Baptist minister

John Martin (1741–1820) was an English Particular Baptist minister.

== Early life ==
The son of John Martin (died 1767), a publican and grazier, by his wife Mary King, he was born at Spalding, Lincolnshire, on 15 March 1741. He was educated at Gosberton, and then at Stamford under Dr. Newark. Soon after his mother's death in 1756 he went as office-boy to an attorney at Holbeach, but became depressed.

== Baptist minister ==
In 1760 Martin moved to London to sit under John Gill. He was baptised by the Rev. Mr. Clark in a garden, Gamlingay, Bedfordshire, and joined the ministry of the Particular Baptists. He was called successively to Kimbolton, Huntingdonshire, Shepshed in Leicestershire where he was an itinerant preacher, and in 1773 to Grafton Street Chapel in London. His ministry was successful, and a new meeting-house was built in Keppel Street, near Bedford Square, in 1795.

In 1790 Martin offended other Baptists by defending the Test and Corporation Acts, and in January 1798 he provoked widespread indignation among English Dissenters by declaring from the pulpit that should the French land in England many of them were quite capable of helping them. A large secession from his chapel followed, and he was ejected from the Particular Baptists, but he continued to preach.

== Last years ==
In April 1814, Martin resigned his pulpit in consequence of a stroke of palsy. He died in London on 23 April 1820, and was buried in Bunhill Fields.

== Works ==
In 1763 Martin became convinced of the duty of believers' baptism and published a pamphlet, suggested partly by his work in London as a watch-finisher, and entitled Mechanicus and Flavens, or the Watch Spiritualised. His writings included:

- ‘The Christian's Peculiar Conflict,’ 1775.
- ‘Familiar Dialogues between Amicus and Britannicus,’ 1776.
- ‘On the End and Evidence of Adoption,’ 1776.
- ‘The Conquest of Canaan … in a Series of Letters from a Father to his Son. Intended for the Amusement and Instruction of Youth,’ 1777.
- ‘The Counsel of Christ to Christians,’ 1779.
- ‘Queries and Remarks on Human Liberty,’ 1783.
- 'A speech on the repeal of such parts of the Test and Corporation Acts as affect conscientious dissenters', 1789.
- ‘A Translation of Marolles's Essay on Providence,’ 1790.
- ‘A Speech on the Repeal of such parts of the Test and Corporation Acts as affect Conscientious Dissenters,’ 1790.
- ‘Animal Magnetism Examined,’ 1790.
- ‘A Letter to a Young Gentleman in Prison’ (under the pseudonym "Eubulus"), 1791.
- ‘A Review of some things pertaining to Civil Government,’ 1791.
- ‘The Character of Christ’ (seventeen sermons), 1793.
- ‘The Case of the Rev. John Sandys, in four Letters to Henry Keene, esq.,’ 1793.
- ‘Some Account of the Life and Writings of the Rev. John Martin.’ An autobiography in the form of letters, dated from Great Russell Street, Bloomsbury, March 1797.
- 'An address to the Board of Baptist Ministers', 1798.
- ‘Letters on Nonconformity,’ 1800.

Joseph Ivimey also credited him with a pamphlet on ‘The Murder of the French King’ (1793).

== Family ==
In 1761 Martin married a Miss Jessup, daughter of a farmer near Sleaford; she died in 1765.

== Notes ==
Attribution

This article incorporates text from a publication now in the public domain: Lee, Sidney, ed. (1893). "Martin, John (1741-1820)". Dictionary of National Biography. Vol. 36. London: Smith, Elder & Co.
