= Christopher Ness =

English ejected minister and theological author

Christopher Ness (1621–1705) was an English ejected minister and theological author. He wrote extensively in an astrological vein, though he rejected the comparison with judicial astrology.

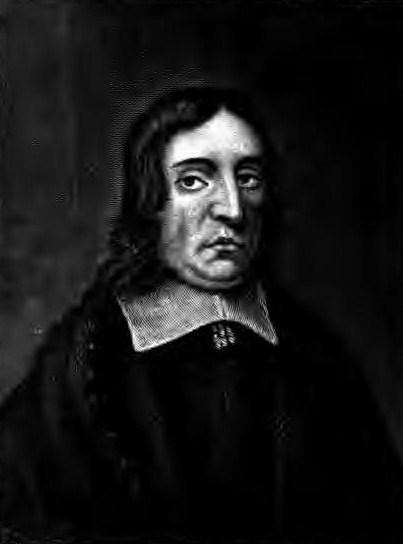
Christopher Ness

== Life ==
Born on 26 December 1621 at North Cave, in the East Riding of Yorkshire, he was son of Thomas Ness, a husbandman. He was at school there under John Seaman, and entered St John's College, Cambridge, on 17 May 1638. He graduated B.A. in 1641/2, and M.A.

When 23 years Ness returned to Yorkshire, where he became an Independent preacher at South Cliffe Chapel in his native parish, in Holderness, and then at Beverley, where he taught a school. On Samuel Winter's election as provost of Trinity College, Dublin, in 1651, Ness was chosen as his successor in the living of Cottingham, East Riding of Yorkshire, though not in episcopal orders. In 1656 he became a preacher at Leeds, and in 1660 he was a lecturer under the vicar, John Lake; but clashed on theology.

After the Uniformity Act 1662, Ness was ejected from his lectureship, and he became a schoolmaster and private preacher at Clayton, Morley, and Hunslet. At Hunslet he took an indulgence as a congregationalist in 1672, and a new meeting-house was opened by him on 3 June 1672. He was excommunicated four times, and when in 1674 or 1675 a writ de excommunicato capiendo was issued against him, he moved to London, where he preached to a private congregation in Salisbury Court, Fleet Street. In 1684 he had to conceal himself from the officers of the crown, who had a warrant for his arrest on the charge of publishing an elegy on the death of his friend Nathaniel Partridge, another nonconformist minister.

Ness died on 26 December 1705, aged exactly 84 years, and was buried at Bunhill Fields burial ground.

== Works ==
Ness's major works were:

- A History and Mystery of the Old and New Testaments, 1696.
- A Protestant Antidote against the Poison of Popery.
- The Crown and Glory of a Christian.
- A Christian's Walk and Work on Earth until he attain to Heaven, 2nd edit. 1678–9.
- A Church History from Adam, and a Scripture Prophecy to the End of the World.
- An Antidote against Arminianism, 1700, a short work with a long life that became popular with Calvinists, a concise guide to doctrines such as election and predestination, as taught by John Owen, Augustus Toplady and others. It reached its sixth edition in 1838, being revised by John A. Jones, who was minister at Mitchell Street, St. Luke's, London. A new edition appeared in 1847 at London and Cambridge.

John Dunton wrote that Ness wrote for him a life of Pope Innocent XI, of which the whole printing sold in two weeks. Entitled The Devil's Patriarck (1683), it had an introductory epistle by Titus Oates.
