= Thomas Dale House =

Coordinates: 32.774710°N 79.929160°W

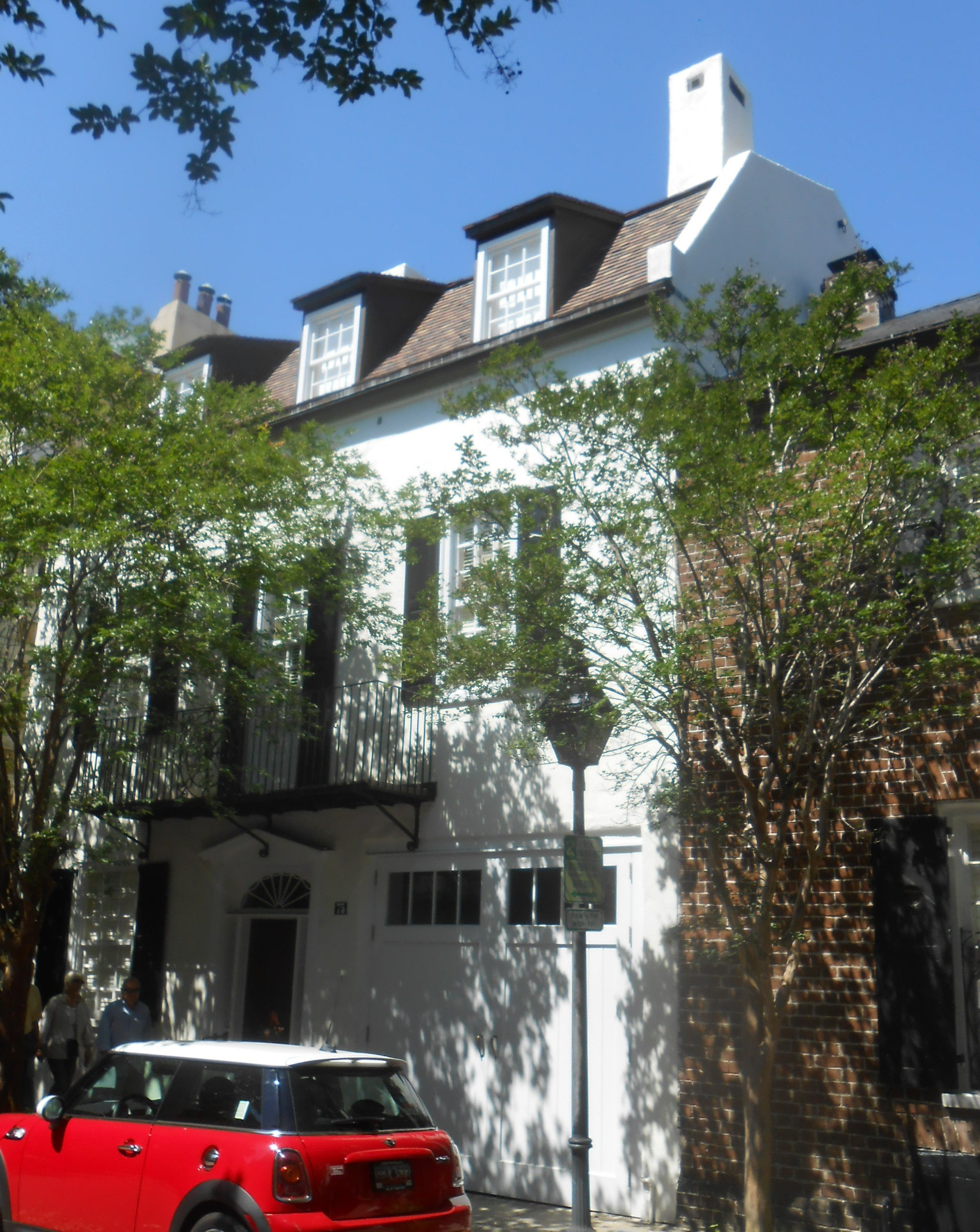
The Thomas Dale House at 73 Church Street, Charleston, South Carolina.

The Thomas Dale House is an early 18th century house in Charleston, South Carolina. The house appears to have been built between 1716 and 1733; Miles Brewton referred to the existing house in a deed of December 1733 when he conveyed the house to his daughter, Mrs. Mary Brewton Dale. Mr. Brewton's son-in-law, Thomas Dale, was a doctor who also translated books, wrote literary pieces, and even served as an assistant justice despite being a "person[] entirely ignorant of the law." (not to be confused with his son, Thomas Dale)

The house originally was three stories, but the top level was removed during a later remodeling. A half-story was returned to the house later still.

It is still privately owned.
