= Philip Furneaux =

English independent minister

Philip Furneaux (1726–1783) was an English independent minister.

== Early life ==
Furneaux was born in December 1726 at Totnes, Devon. He attended Totnes Grammar School, where he formed a lifelong friendship with Benjamin Kennicott. In 1742 or 1743 he came to London to study for the dissenting ministry under David Jennings, at the dissenting academy in Wellclose Square. He appears to have remained at the academy till 1749, probably assisting Jennings, whose Hebrew Antiquities he later edited (1766).

After ordination he became (1749) assistant to Henry Read, minister of the presbyterian congregation at St. Thomas's, Southwark. On the resignation of Roger Pickering, around 1752, he became in addition one of the two preachers of the Sunday evening lecture at Salters' Hall. Retaining this lectureship, in 1753 he succeeded Moses Lowman in the pastorate of the independent congregation at Clapham. Despite hesitant delivery in preaching, he drew a large congregation.

He received the degree of D.D. on 3 August 1767, from Marischal College, Aberdeen. From October 1769 to January 1775 he was relieved of the afternoon service on his lecture evenings by Samuel Morton Savage, D.D. As a member of the Coward Trust he had much to do with the revised plan of education adopted by the trustees on Philip Doddridge's death. He was also from 1766 to 1778 a trustee of Daniel Williams's foundations.

== Activist ==
Furneaux was known for his work on behalf of the rights of nonconformists. His name is associated with the progress of the 'sheriff's case,’ a legal case before the courts in the period 1754 to 1767. It arose out of an expedient adopted in 1748 by the Corporation of London to raise money for building the Mansion House, by fining nonconformists who declined to qualify for the office of Sheriff of London in accordance with the Sacramental Test Act. In 1754, three nonconformists resisted this imposition. The case reached the House of Lords in 1767, and in February of that year was decided in favour of the nonconformists; and it was on this occasion that Lord Mansfield delivered the speech in which occurs the remark that the 'dissenters' way of worship' is not only lawful but 'established.' This speech was reported, without notes, by Furneaux with assistance from another hearer, Samuel Wilton, D.D., independent minister of the Weighhouse, Eastcheap. Mansfield, who revised the report, found in it only ta few small errors.

In 1769 the fourth volume of William Blackstone's Commentaries on the Laws of England appeared, in which, under the head of 'Offences against God and Religion,’ nonconformity is treated as a crime. Joseph Priestley was the first to attack this opinion; Blackstone replied in a pamphlet (2 September 1769). In the following year Furneaux published his 'Letters to Mr. Justice Blackstone,’ with a moral argument against enforcing religious truths by civil penalties.

Furneaux was present on 6 February 1772 in the gallery of the House of Commons with Edward Pickard, presbyterian minister of Carter Lane, when the clerical petition for relief from subscription, known as the 'Feathers' petition,’ was under discussion. The speeches of Sir William Meredith and Sir George Savile in favour of the petition were reported by Furneaux from memory. In the course of the debate the remark was made by Lord North, who opposed the petition, that if similar relief were asked by the dissenting clergy there would be no reasonable objection to it. Acting on this hint Furneaux and Pickard called a meeting of nonconformist ministers of the three denominations, who adopted an application to Parliament (prepared by Furneaux) for relief from doctrinal subscription. A relief bill passed the Commons on 3 April 1772 without a division; on 18 May it was rejected in the Lords. In support of a second bill to the same effect Furneaux published his 'Essay on Toleration' (1773). Relief was at length granted (1779), but not, as Furneaux desired, without a test. In the new subscription, the Holy Scriptures were substituted for the Thirty-Nine Articles.

He was a friend of Anne Steele (the writer Theodosia).

== Later life ==
In 1777 he was seized with hereditary insanity, and remained under this affliction till his death on 27 November 1783. A fund was raised for his support, which became a charity supporting Unitarian institutions, Manchester New College and the Ministers' Benevolent Society.

== Works ==
He published:

- Letters to the Honourable Mr. Justice Blackstone concerning his Exposition of the Act of Toleration, &c., 1770; the 2nd edition, 1771, has additions, and Mansfield's speech as appendix; reprinted, Philadelphia, 1773.
- An Essay on Toleration, &c., 1773.

Other works were: a sermon on education (1755), a fast sermon (1758), funeral sermon for Henry Miles, D.D. (1763), sermon at ordination of Samuel Wilton (1766), ordination charge to George Waters and William Youat (1769), and sermon to the Society for Propagating Christian Knowledge in the Highlands (1775).

In 1771 Furneaux was engaged in transcribing and editing the biblical annotations of Samuel Chandler, but the work was never published.
