= Campo Santo =

Campo santo is a word for cemetery in Italian and Spanish and may refer to:

== People ==
- Andrés del Campo Santos (born 1980), Spanish footballer
- Henrique Campos Santos (born 1990), Brazilian footballer
- Rayllan Campos Santos (born 1989), Brazilian footballer
- Thiago Campos Santos (born 1984), Brazilian footballer

== Places ==
- Campo Santo, Salta, a town and municipality in Salta Province, northwestern Argentina
- Camposanto, a comune in the Province of Modena, Italy
- El Campo Santo Cemetery, City of Industry, California
- Campo Santo, Ghent, a Roman Catholic burial ground in Belgium
- Campo Santo de La Loma, a cemetery in Manila, Philippines
- San Joaquin Campo Santo, a cemetery in Iloilo, Philippines

== Other uses ==
- Battle of Campo Santo, part of the War of the Austrian Succession, fought in Camposanto, Italy in 1743
- Camposanto Monumentale, or Campo Santo, or Camposanto Vecchio, a historical edifice in Pisa, Italy
- Campo Santo, a former cemetery beside Perpignan Cathedral, France
- Campo Santo Teutonico, a Catholic college in Rome
- Santa Maria della Pietà in Camposanto dei Teutonici, a Roman Catholic church in Vatican City
- Campo Santo, a book by W. G. Sebald
- Campo Santo (company), video game developer of Firewatch
