= John Asty =

English dissenting clergyman

John Asty (c. 1672 – 1730) was an English dissenting clergyman.

== Life ==
Asty was born in Norwich about 1672, the son of Robert Asty of Norwich and grandson to the ejected minister of Stratford, whose Christian name was John. In his funeral sermon by John Guyse (1730) he was said to have made "thankful acknowledgments" for godly parents and a religious education. He spent several years during the earlier part of his ministry in the family of the Fleetwoods of Stoke Newington, then outside London. In 1713 he was ordained as pastor to a congregation in Ropemaker's Alley, Moorfields, London, where he remained for the rest of his life.

Asty was involved in controversy with Martin Tomkins, another minister in Stoke Newington, who was an early Arian-Socinian; Asty asserted the Biblical-Athanasian doctrine. Later Asty signed the declaration "on the doctrine of the blessed Trinity", as promulgated in the first article of the Church of England and in the answer to the fifth and sixth questions of the Assembly's catechism, agreed on at the Salters' Hall synod, 7 April 1719.

An admirer of the practical writings of John Owen, Asty died on 20 January 1730, and was buried in Bunhill Fields.

== Works ==
He published only a single sermon, on the death of Mrs. Elizabeth Fleetwood, preached at Stoke Newington on 23 June 1728 from Job ix. 12. He also prefixed a memoir to the collective folio volume of the Sermons and Tracts of Dr. John Owen (1721). Among the 1662 farewell sermons is one by John Asty, the ejected clergyman of Stratford, and Robert Asty of Norwich published a book called 'Treatise of Rejoicing in the Lord Jesus in all Cases and Conditions' (1683).
