= Henry Miles =

- Born: 2 June 1698; Stroud, England, Kingdom of England
- Died: 10 February 1763 (aged 64)
- Education: University of Aberdeen (DD)

Henry Miles, FRS (2 June 1698 – 10 February 1763) was an English Dissenting minister, scientific writer, and Fellow of the Royal Society known for experiments on electricity.

== Life ==
He was born in Stroud, Gloucestershire, on 2 June 1698. He was educated for the dissenting ministry, probably in London. His first settlement was at Lower Tooting, Surrey, where he succeeded Francis Freeman (died 17 November 1726), a Presbyterian. Miles was at this time an Independent (congregationalist). He was ordained in 1731. In 1737, still retaining his Tooting charge, he became assistant to Samuel Chandler, at the Old Jewry meeting-house. From this time he was counted as a Presbyterian.

He held the double appointment till 1744, and for the rest of his life was minister at Tooting only, having John Beesley as his assistant from 1756. In 1743, he was elected a Fellow of the Royal Society, and in 1744 he received the degree of D.D. from the University of Aberdeen. To his pulpit work, for thirty years, he devoted two days a week, rising between two and three in the morning to write his sermons.

He was a friend of Daniel Neal, and Nathaniel Lardner, and a correspondent of Philip Doddridge, to whom he sent some criticisms of his Family Expositor. He died on 10 February 1763. His funeral sermon was preached by Philip Furneaux.

== Legacy ==
His widow, Emma Miles (died 1790), by deeds of 6 October 1763 and 15 February 1766, settled an endowment of £500 on the ministry at Tooting, and conveyed the meeting-house to trustees for the use of Dissenters of "the presbyterian or independent denomination." In 1880, the property became the subject of a chancery suit, which was decided on 1 March 1888 in favour of the Independents.

== Works ==
His communications to the Philosophical Transactions extend from 1741 to 1753, and relate to natural history, meteorology, and electricity, in which he made new experiments. He gave assistance to Thomas Birch in his edition (1744) of the works of Robert Boyle.
