= John Hyatt (minister) =

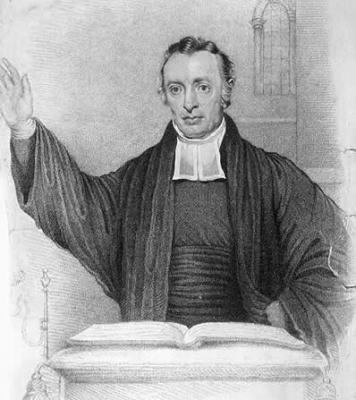
- Born: 12 January 1767; Sherborne, Dorset, England
- Died: 30 January 1826; Hackney, Middlesex, England
- Education: Self-schooling and apprentice carpenter
- Spouse: Elizabeth Westcombe

John Hyatt (12 January 1767 – 30 January 1826) was an English nonconformist minister and missionary. He found Wesleyan theology as a young man and went on to become a revered driving force of early Methodism in London, becoming influential in continuing the Evangelical Revival started by George Whitefield in the 1740s. Hyatt preached regularly in the slums of Hackney in London's East End. He gained a large following and was always in demand for his sermons, which were greatly influenced by those of John Wesley and George Whitefield.

== Family ==
John Hyatt was born on 12 January 1767 in Sherborne, Dorset, to John Guppy Hyatt and Elizabeth Hyatt. He was baptised on 24 January 1767, in Sherborne. His father (John Guppy Hyatt) was innkeeper of the Crosskeys Inn, Sherborne, with his wife Elizabeth being described as the victualler of the same inn after his death.

John Hyatt was married in 1787 to Elizabeth Westcombe, who was born in 1765 in Kingston, Somerset to William Westcombe and Eleanor Varder. They had eleven children between 1787 and 1805.

== Biography ==
Hyatt was brought up in the Crosskeys inn, Sherborne, Dorset (still existing today), as it was owned by his parents. At 14 he was an apprentice cabinet maker, and he later took charge of the business upon the death of the owner.

According to Alfred W Light's book about the Bunhill Fields burial ground in London, one of Hyatt's unnamed biographers said this of his relationship with his father:

His father beholds the astonishing reverse in his spirit and conduct; but, instead of rejoicing over his reformed son, he beholds him with hateful and malicious eyes; and resolves, if it be possible, to deter him from pursuing his newly adopted course. The father vehemently expostulates, the son meekly replies; the father is greatly apprehensive of his son's derangement, the son is anxiously concerned for his father's eternal state! The father promises, then threatens; he loves his child, but he hates his religion. Ah! ignorant man! little dost thou think that thou art daringly meddling with God! Forbear, then, from persisting in thy design; thy son knows that he ought to obey God rather than man.

Hyatts' religious thinking was influenced by his wife, who was the niece of a dissenting minister named Vardy. In 1794 he became friendly with the Rev J. Weston, a visiting Wesleyan preacher, and this led to Hyatt preaching his first sermon at Compton, near Sherborne.

Hyatt was ordained on 17 July 1798. He moved to Mere in Wiltshire, then in 1800 he became the Pastor of the Zion Congregational Church in Frome, Somerset. He resigned that office in May 1805 when his peers in the church sent him (not entirely at his own wish) to London. He was sent to Whitefield's Tabernacle, Tottenham Court Road to become the co-pastor with Matthew Wilks (father of John Wilks). In relinquishing his Frome charge, much to the distress of his congregation, he said:

Their love and liberality are unbounded. I have been a master, without the necessity of ruling; a servant, without being ruled; and a friend, without being slighted. (Recorded by the Late W. J. HARVEY, Deacon & Secretary of the Zion Church, Frome)

In 1805 he became co-pastor and a minister of the London Tabernacle for the next 20 years or so until his death. Among his many spiritual and charitable works, he was instrumental in founding the Aged Pilgrims' Friend Society, originally set-up in 1807 to provide grants and pensions to needy elderly Christians. As recorded in Mr. J. E. Hazelton's "Inasmuch", Hyatt was closely connected with the society and he drew up the second address that was issued by the committee. The ministry has grown so that it now has 16 schemes throughout England, providing a range of services for older people, from sheltered housing through to nursing and dementia care, as well as home-leave accommodation for missionary families.

During his time at the tabernacle, Hyatt was well known for his forthright sermons which were printed eagerly by the popular press and the evangelical chronicles of the time. These publications generated vast amounts of income for the church and for John, most of which he passed to missions and friendly societies in his travels. His career was well followed in the press as he travelled around the countryside preaching to any that would listen, especially those congregations in the chapels set up by Selina Hastings, Countess of Huntingdon during The Countess of Huntingdon's Connexion, a small society of evangelical churches founded in 1783 and strongly associated with the Calvinist Methodist movement of George Whitefield. Hyatt was greatly involved with charitable societies, often being seen at meetings of the London Missionary Society and seamen's missions along the Thames.

He is also to be found in Dublin in 1821, preaching there and in more than 40 other towns and villages in the north of Ireland. Over the next few years he is to be found preaching in Kent, Wiltshire, Bristol, Northampton, York and many other places that wanted to hear his renowned sermons. He was very well respected, and influenced the likes of Edward Mote, who wrote more than one hundred hymns published in his book, "Hymns of Praise" (London, 1836). His hymn, "The Solid Rock" lives on today in many church services. During his life in London, John lived at 61 Great Russell Street, Bloomsbury Square.

Quote:

It is the fashion in the present day to talk of man's enlightenment, and to represent human nature as upheaving under its load, as straining towards a knowledge of truth; such is not in reality the case, and whenever there is an effort in the mind untaught of the Spirit, it is directed towards God as the great moral and not as the great spiritual Being. A man untaught of the Holy Ghost may long to know a moral, he can never desire to know a spiritual Being.

== Death ==
John Hyatt died on 30 January 1826, aged 59, in Hackney, London, and was buried in Bunhill Fields, London. His obituary read: "[he] was an Englishman of simple rural ... He went on to become a much loved and revered driving force of early Methodism in London, becoming influential in continuing the First Great Awakening started by George Whitefield in the 1740s." His wife died six years later in 1832, and was buried with him in Bunhill Fields cemetery.

== Notes ==
Listed in the Surman Index is a short history of his career.

- 1790–1796 Compton, Dorset and Itinerant
- 1796–n.d. Mere, Wiltshire (Pastor)
- 1798–1800 Mere, Wiltshire
- 1800–1805 Frome, Somerset
- 1805–1826 Tabernacle, London Middlesex (Co-Pastor)
