= Joseph Hart =

British Calvinist minister

Joseph Hart (1711/12–1768)
- Born: 1711/12 (unknown date); London
- Died: 24 May 1768; London
- Education: Place of study is uncertain
- Occupations: Minister/Pastor and language teacher
- Spouse: Mary Hart (née Hughes)

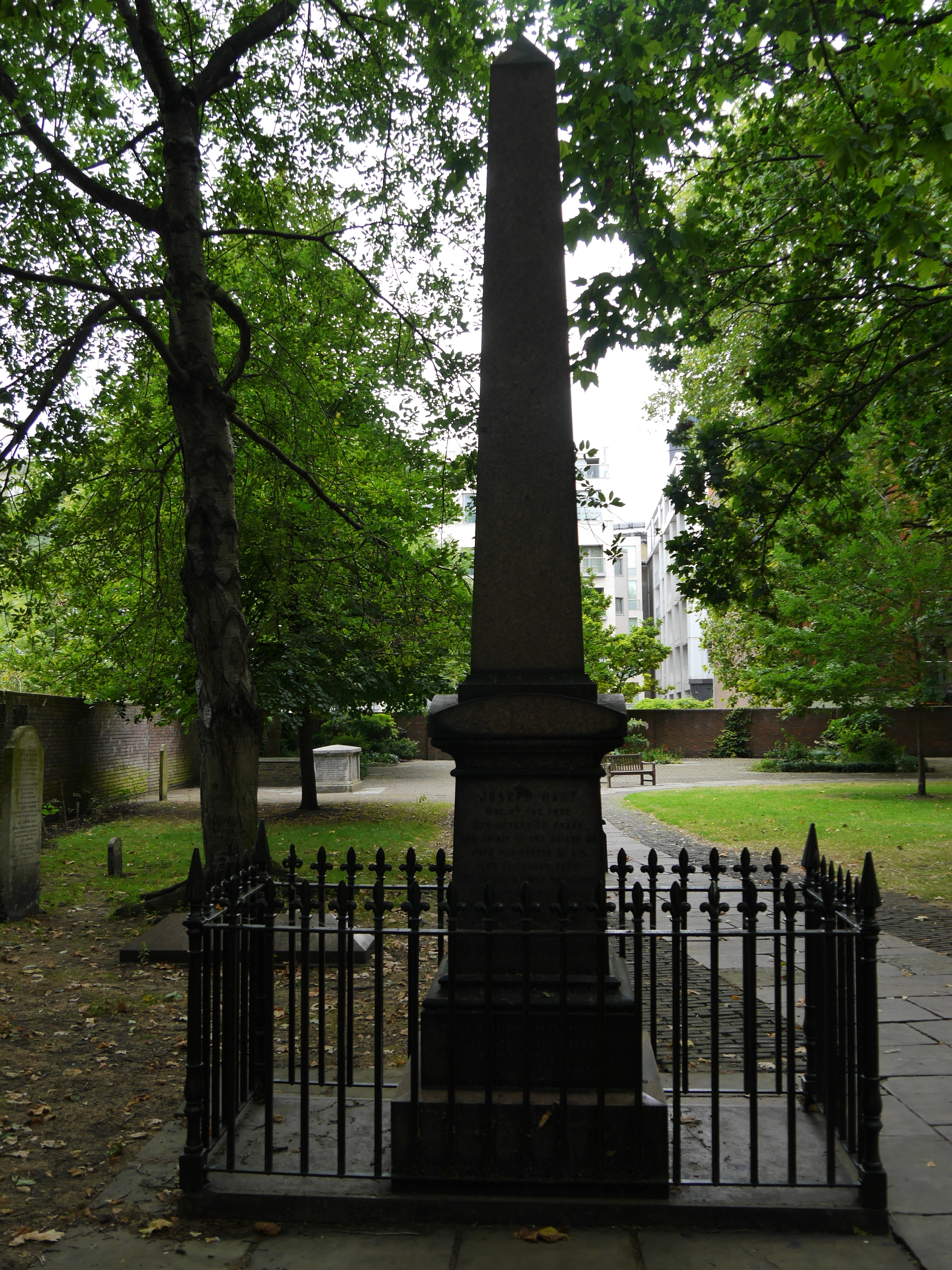
Monument in Bunhill Fields burial ground

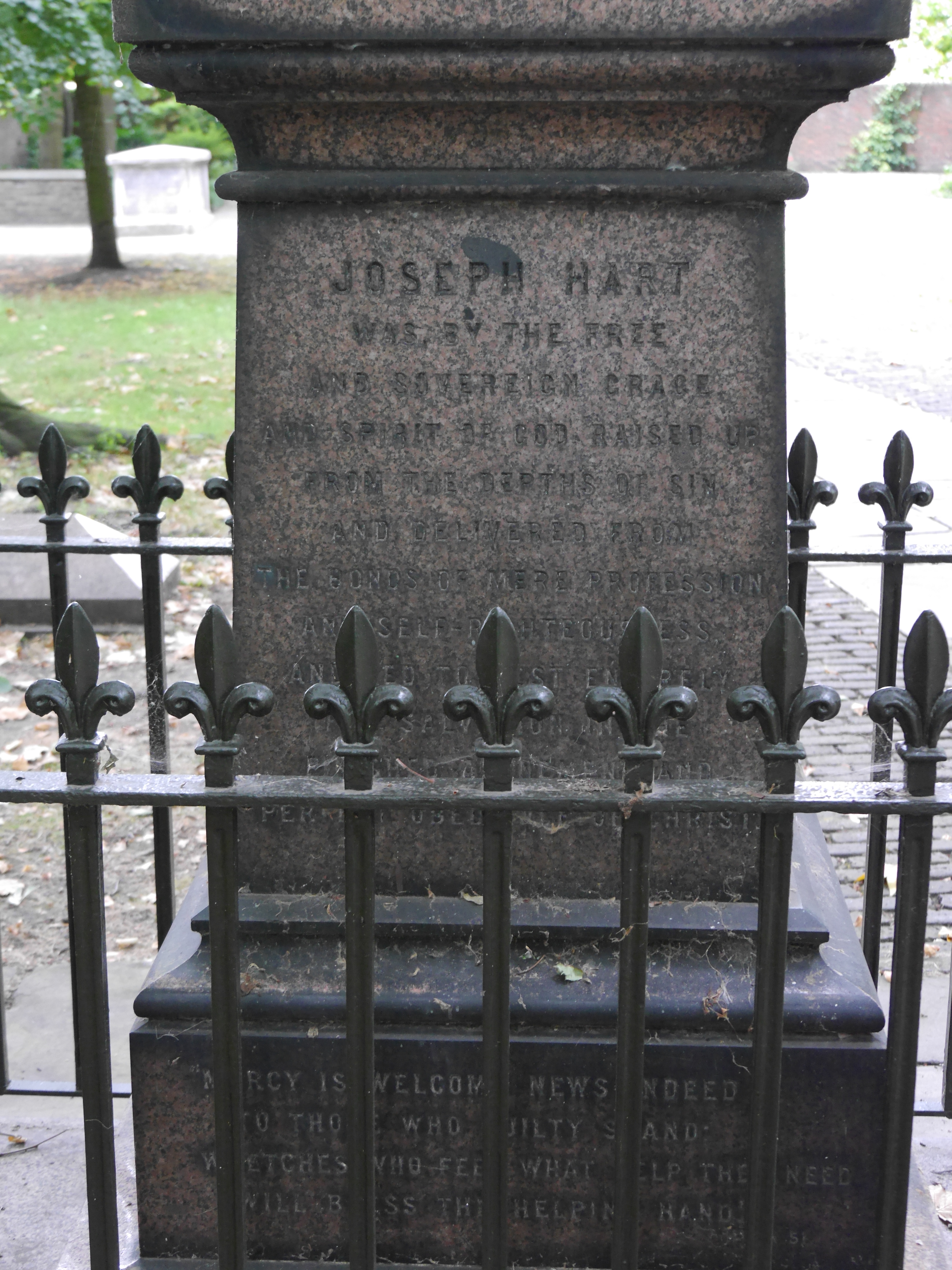
Inscription on monument

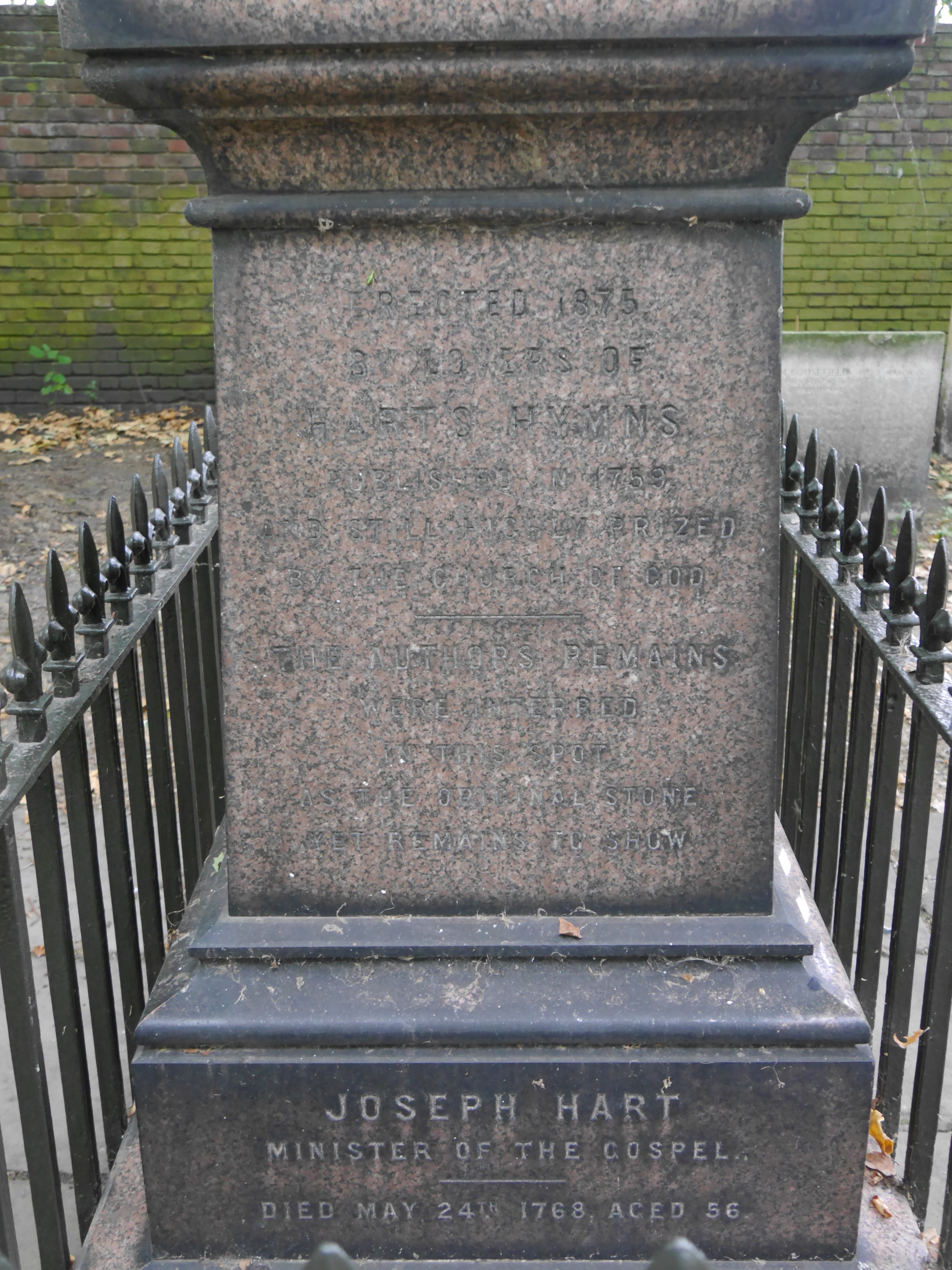
Inscription on monument

Joseph Hart (1711/12 – 24 May 1768) was a Calvinist minister in London. His works include Hart's Hymns, a much-loved hymn book amongst evangelical Christians throughout its lifetime of over 200 years, which includes the well-known hymn, "Come ye sinners, poor and needy".

One of Hart's early publications was a tract denouncing Christianity (prior to his conversion) called The Unreasonableness of Religion, Being Remarks and Animadversions on the Rev. John Wesley's Sermon on Romans 8:32. His other works include a short autobiography and a few poetical translations of ancient classics.

He preached at Jewin Street chapel in London, a building with multiple galleries, to a congregation of significant size.

Only one of Hart's sermons is known: that of Christmas 1767. Several of his hymns appear in the Sacred Harp.

== Early life ==
Hart's early life is poorly documented. He had a good education, learning the classical languages (Latin, Hebrew, and Greek), which afterwards he taught for a living. He spent a lot of his early life translating and writing poetry.

It was in this period of his life that Hart translated Herodian and Phocylides.

Hart wrote of his early life in his autobiography:

As I had the happiness of being born of believing parents, I imbibed the sound doctrine of the Gospel from my infancy; nor was I without touches of the heart, checks of the conscience, and meltings of affections, by the secret strivings of God's Spirit within me while very young; but the impressions were not deep, nor the influences lasting, being frequently defaced and quenched by the vanities and vices of childhood and youth.

Hart was brought up in the Christian life, but soon fell into temptation. It was about this time of turmoil in his life, that he met and married a girl named Mary, 14 years younger than himself.

== Libertine and author ==
It was during this period of Hart's life that he left off doing his good works, and became a libertine, believing that there is no need to be righteous, all you need is to believe in God, then salvation is certain. It was then that he wrote The Unreasonableness of Religion, in an effort to convince John Wesley that he should not be doing good works only believing in God. The pamphlet had no effect upon Wesley, being accounted mere blasphemy. Hart later repented of writing it, and gave Wesley an unreserved apology.

During this period, Hart also translated Phocylides from the original Greek in 1744, and Herodian from its original Latin in 1749.

== Conversion ==
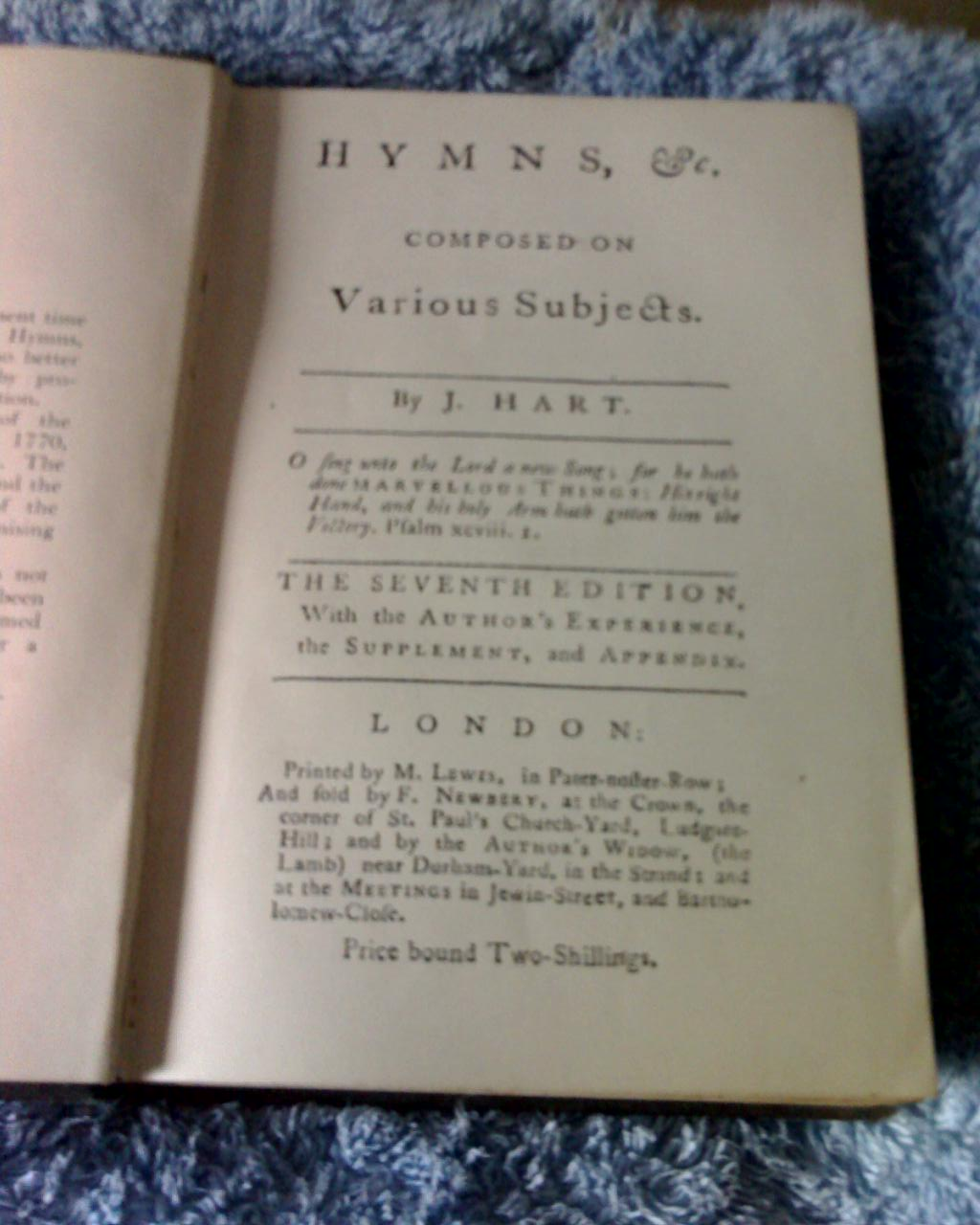
Hart's Hymns, 7th edition (1770)

Hart later considered that there was a need both to do good works and to believe in God. But then came the uncertainty: Was he really and truly saved? He had no indication from God, no elaborate vision, telling him that he had been saved. This was a great worry to Joseph Hart. He began to pray to God that there would be some revelation granted him, or perhaps just a little sign. This tormented Hart for more than a year.

Then, the week before Easter of the year 1757 Hart "had such an amazing view of the agony of Christ in the garden [of Gethsemane]", showing him that all Christ's sufferings were for him (along with the rest of the church).

But soon after this, Hart again began to be afraid of the life to come (eternity), and feared exceedingly when reading about the condemned in passages in the Bible.

It was on Whitsunday that Hart's true conversion came. He was converted under the ministry of George Whitefield, and felt blessed in his soul.

After these times Hart still had sufferings and uncertainties as to his conversion, but he could always look back to his conversion, and believe that God saved his soul.

Hart's motto after this time was: "Pharasaic zeal and Antinomian security are the two engines of Satan, with which he grinds the church in all ages, as betwixt [between] the upper and the nether [lower] millstone. The space between them is much narrower and harder to find than most men imagine. It is a path which the vulture's eye hath not seen; and none can show it us but the Holy Ghost."

== Death and burial ==
Hart died on 24 May 1768. He was buried in Bunhill Fields. 20,000 people are said to have attended his burial, and listened to the funeral oration by Andrew Kinsman.

The inscription on his monument reads:

Joseph Hart was by the free and sovereign grace and Spirit of God raised up from the depths of sin, and delivered from the bonds of mere profession and self-righteousness, and led to rest entirely for salvation in the finished atonement and perfect obedience of Christ.

== Publications ==
- The Unreasonableness of Religion (1741)
- Herodian, a translated work of poetry (1749)
- Phocylides, a poem translated from Greek (1744)
- Hymns, etc. Composed on Various Subjects ("Hart's Hymns") (1759 and many later editions)
- A sermon from the Gospel of Luke preached at Christmas in the year 1767
