= Burder =

Burder is a surname. Notable people with the surname include:

- George Burder (1752–1832), English divine
- Henry Forster Burder (1783–1864), English church minister
- Samuel Burder (1773–1837), English church minister and writer
- Thomas Harrison Burder (1789–1843), English physician and author

== See also ==
- Burger (surname)
