= Wymondley College =

Dissenting academy in Hertfordshire, England

Coordinates: 51.93215°N 0.239249°W

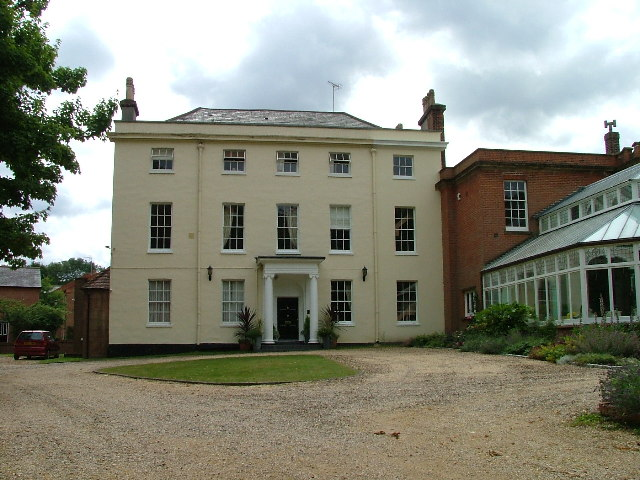
Wymondley House in 2005, the former home of Wymondley College

Wymondley College was a dissenting academy at Wymondley House in Little Wymondley, Hertfordshire, England. Intended for the education of future nonconformist ministers of religion, it was in operation from 1799 to 1833, when it relocated to Byng Place in London and became known as Coward College. It was also known as Wymondley Academy and Wymondley House.

== Foundation ==
In 1799, a philanthropic trust established by William Coward took possession of Wymondley House in Little Wymondley, Hertfordshire. They intended it to be a replacement home for the Daventry Academy, a somewhat peripatetic institution which had last been based in Northampton. It had closed that location in 1798 on receiving a report that John Horsey, whom it had placed in charge there in 1789, was preaching Socinianism. The Coward Trust spent £4,258 on purchase and renovation of the Wymondley building, enlarging it to accommodate two tutors and 24 students (Note: Historic England suggest a capacity of 24 students; however, Simon Dixon says that the 19 students present in 1826 represented a "full" student roll.) in their pursuit of studies for dissenting ministry. The trust also determined that the school should be known as Wymondley House, although in practice even in its own day it was more commonly referred to as Wymondley College or Wymondley Academy.

== Staff ==
Overall management of the college was the responsibility of four trustees. William Parry was appointed as theological tutor at the new site, a post that gave to its holder and his wife the responsibility for domestic management. Parry, who had been educated at the Homerton dissenting academy, had the support of the King's Head Society and it was hoped that he would prevent the influence of heresy.

At first, Parry was assisted in the teaching of classics and mathematics by William Ward, a former student at Homerton who had become minister at Uppingham. Ward resigned in 1804 after a disagreement with Parry. He was replaced by one of Parry's own former students, William Brown, who left in 1807 when students complained about him. Two more short-lived holders of the assistant's post followed, with Henry Forster Burder, who had been educated at Hoxton College, and Alexander Bower both staying a year. Homerton-educated John Bailey was appointed in December 1809 and his death in 1818 led to the brief tenure of William Day, a former student of Wymondley whom Parry then found to have been depraved in his conduct. Parry died in January 1819, not long after reporting Day to the trustees.

Parry's leadership had been characterised by a lack of discipline within the college but this did not improve much with the arrival his replacement, John Atkinson, who had previously been headmaster at Mill Hill School and a tutor of classics at Hoxton College. Some students were expelled and others moved to Manchester College, York as, not for the first time, accusations of doctrinal differences emerged. In February 1821, the trustees told Atkinson that he was unsuitable for the post, an event that may have caused him to die soon after following a paralytic seizure. His successor was briefly the former Hoxton student Joseph Turnbull and then Thomas Morell, who held the post until the closure of the college in 1833.

Morell, who had been an Independent minister at St Neots in Huntingdonshire, was assisted until September 1822 by Turnbull, whom the trustees then deemed to be unsuitable. Turnbull's replacement as assistant was Robert Lee of Cambridge, who tenure was ended two years later following what was described as a "moment of weakness" involving a female servant while his wife was away. Historian Simon Dixon notes that "Expulsions, resignations, and defections to the Church of England occurred throughout the Wymondley period, with significant breakdowns in discipline occurring in 1812, 1816, 1820, and 1833" but that the Morell era was generally less fractious than the years preceding him. This may have been at least in part because Morell made it a condition of his own appointment that the college, although reluctant, introduced a probationary period for new students, whereas previously there had been no screening at all. The reputation of the college, which at one point had been so bad due to allegations of heterodoxy that local churches hesitated to accept the services of its students, and whose student roll had been as low as four in 1821, was restored. There were 19 enrolled students in 1826.

Aside from the full-time academic staff, there were also occasional visiting lecturers. For example, William Trew, who had taught elocution elsewhere, gave classes in 1805 and 1822, John Jackson gave lessons on natural philosophy for some time after the arrival of Morell, and Charles Frederick Partington did the same between 1827 and 1829.

There had been an approach from the Bristol Theological Institution in 1819, suggesting that the academy should move to Bristol, but the proposal was dismissed. The first evidence of a serious intent to move location is documented in December 1831, when the trustees thought a shift to London would open opportunities to access teaching at the University of London, which had recently opened. Suitable premises were soon found, the site at Wymondley was closed and sold, and in 1833 the college moved to Byng Place, London, where it was known as Coward College. Morell, who had initially been skeptical of moving, became theological tutor at the new institution. Turnbull's successor as assistant, William Hull, had been told that his services would not be required there because Morell could cope alone if students also had access to the university, and thus in 1832 he left to become a minister in Enfield. Classics tutoring for the brief period thereafter was done by Richard Cotterell Evans.

== Curriculum ==
College students were enrolled on five-year courses and lived on the premises. The costs of boarding and tuition were mostly met by the Coward Trust but, since Coward's will excluded giving regular grants to those aged over 22, the Jackson Trust often provided support for older students.

The theology course was much influenced by the lectures of Philip Doddridge and the students benefitted from the library that he had started and which had been expanded into a well-respected collection as the college had moved around its various previous locations in Daventry, Hoxton and Northampton. They were also taught a range of obviously relevant subjects, including ethics, pneumatology, scriptural chronology and theology. Other subjects included algebra, geography, geometry, logic and natural philosophy, as well as the Greek, Hebrew and Latin languages, and Jewish antiquities. In addition to these subjects, the last of which was based on the work of Caleb Ashworth, Morell introduced courses on general history and the history of philosophy and science, as well as lectures on belles lettres.

== After closure ==
Following the closure of the college, Wymondley House became a boys' boarding school and later had numerous other uses. The structure was listed Grade II* in 1968.

== Notable people ==
Over 130 students were enrolled while the college was based at Wymondley. Notable former students and teachers include:

- Thomas Binney
- Henry Forster Burder
- John Curwen
- David Everard Ford
- Edward Miall
- William Harris Murch
- William Parry

== See also ==
- List of dissenting academies (1660–1800)
