= Samuel Palmer (biographer) =

English nonconformist minister and biographer

Samuel Palmer (1741–1813) was an English nonconformist minister, known as a biographer.

== Life ==
He was born at Bedford, was educated at Bedford School, and then studied for the ministry (1758–62) at Daventry Academy under Caleb Ashworth.

In 1762 Palmer became afternoon preacher to the independent (originally presbyterian) congregation at Mare Street, Hackney, and was ordained on 21 November 1763. From 10 June 1763 he occasionally assisted William Langford, D.D. (1704–1755), at the Weigh-house Chapel, Little Eastcheap, and was the regular morning preacher there from 20 June 1765 to 28 December 1766. He then succeeded William Hunt as morning preacher at Mare Street, and remained in charge of the congregation, which moved in 1771 to St. Thomas's Square, until his death.

For some years, from about 1780, Palmer had a boarding-school. He was a quiet preacher, his views being close to those of his friend, Job Orton. He early adopted Sunday school for his church. Henry Forster Burder was his assistant from October 1811; but Palmer remained active in his charge to the last, preaching on the Sunday before his death. He died on 28 November 1813, and was interred on 6 December in the burial-ground at St. Thomas's Square. His funeral sermon was preached by Thomas N. Toller of Kettering, Northamptonshire.

Palmer left a numerous family. His son Samuel entered Daventry Academy in 1786, and became a schoolmaster at Chigwell, Essex.

== Works ==
Palmer is known for his Protestant Dissenters' Catechism and his Nonconformist's Memorial.

The catechism was undertaken at the request of several ministers, who wanted a supplement to the Westminster Shorter Catechism giving the grounds of dissent. The manuscript was revised by Philip Furneaux and Job Orton, and published in 1772. Its two sections deal with the history and principles of nonconformity. It was successful, reaching a third edition in 1773, and saw additions and revisions by various editors; the 29th edition was published in 1890. A translation into Welsh was first published in 1775. An edition adapted for Irish presbyterians was published at Belfast, 1824. It was too long for its original purpose, and Palmer issued The Protestant Dissenters' Shorter Catechism … a Supplement to the Assembly's, 1783.

At Orton's suggestion Palmer undertook an abridgment of the Account of the Ministers … Ejected (1713), by Edmund Calamy, incorporating the Continuation of 1727. The work was published in parts, as The Nonconformist's Memorial 1775–8, 2 vols.; an enlarged edition was published in 1802–3, 3 vols. It is considered somewhat careless. Projected additional volumes did not appear.

Palmer published funeral sermons for Samuel Sanderson (1776), Caleb Ashworth (1775), Samuel Wilton, D.D. (1778), John Howard (1790), Habakkuk Crabb (1795), and other sermons (1774–90); also:

- The Calvinism of the Protestant Dissenters asserted, 1786.
- A Vindication of the Modern Dissenters, 1790, against William Hawkins (1722–1801).
- An Apology for the Christian Sabbath, 1799.
- Memoirs of Hugh Farmer, 1804, (anon.)
- Memoirs of Matthew Henry, 1809, prefixed to Henry's Miscellaneous Works; also separately.
- Dr. Watts no Socinian, &c., 1813.

He edited, with notes, Samuel Johnson's Life of Isaac Watts, 1785, and Orton's Letters to Dissenting Ministers, 1806, 2 vols., with memoir. He contributed to the Protestant Dissenter's Magazine and Monthly Repository. His life of Samuel Clark, the Daventry tutor, is in the Monthly Repository, 1806; that of Caleb Ashworth, is in the same magazine, 1813.

== See also ==
- Henry Robinson Palmer
