= John Fell (tutor) =

British congregationalist minister and tutor (1735–1797)

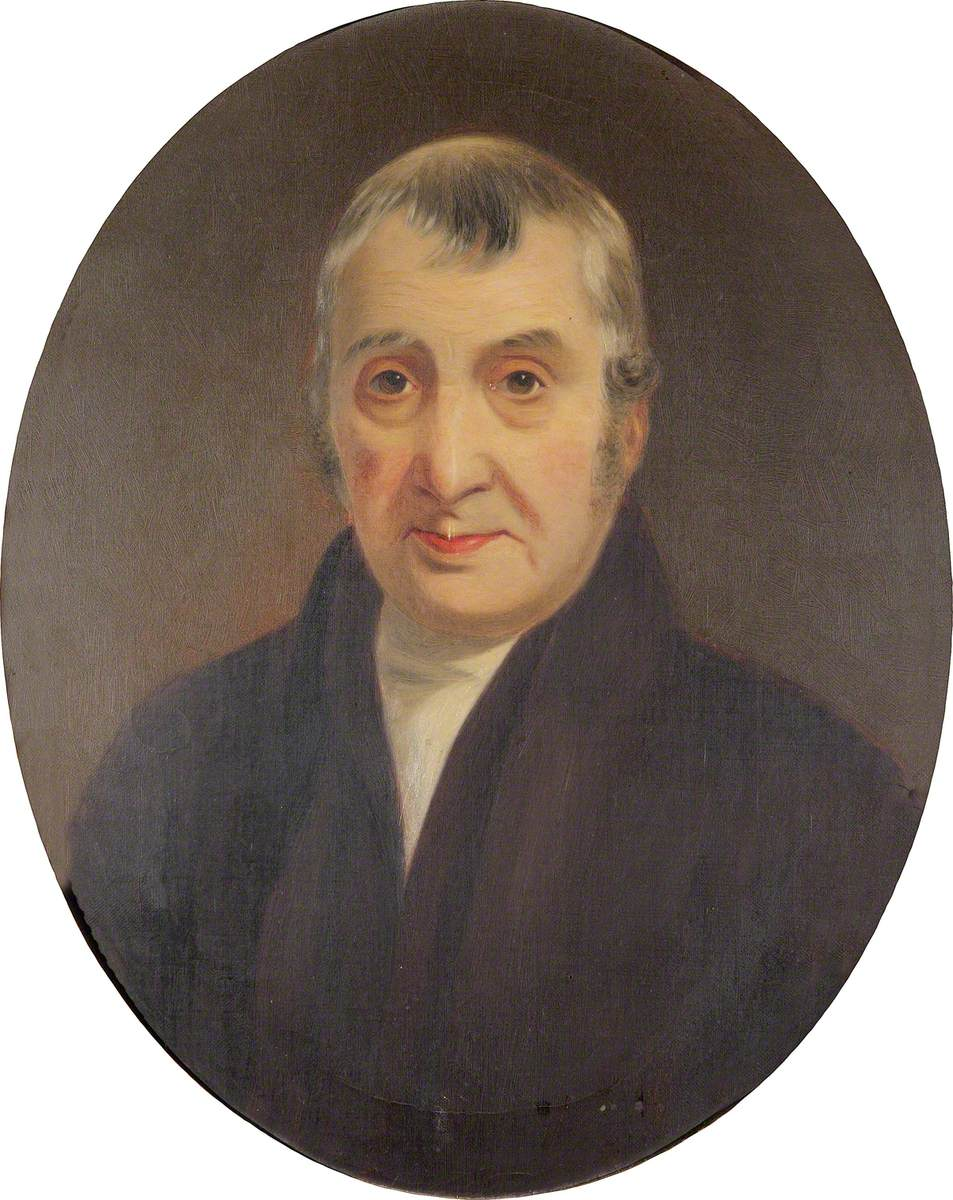
John Fell, c. 1780

John Fell (22 August 1735, Cockermouth – 6 September 1797, Homerton Academy) was an English Congregationalist minister and classical tutor.

== Life ==
Fell was born at Cockermouth, Cumberland, on 22 August 1735. His father, Daniel Fell, was a schoolmaster, clerk to the dissenting congregation, and occasional village preacher. Fell was apprenticed to a tailor, and after serving his time obtained a situation in London. His bent was towards the dissenting ministry, and by the help of the King's Head Society he was placed in 1757 at the Mile End academy under John Conder, D.D. The classical tutor was John Walker, D.D., an excellent scholar, who took a great fancy to Fell, and gave him private instructions. On leaving the academy he was for a short time assistant in a school at Norwich. In 1762 he was invited to take charge of an independent congregation at Beccles, Suffolk. He preached there for several years, but declined the pastorate, the church not being organised to his satisfaction.

In May 1770 he succeeded David Parry as minister of the congregational church at Thaxted, Essex, where he was ordained on 24 October. This was his happiest settlement; His congregation grew, he lived on intimate terms with successive rectors of the parish, and with Rayner Hickford, the Saxon scholar; and he had time for literary and theological pursuits and for private tuition. One of his young tutees during this period was Richard Sharp with whom he formed a lifelong friendship, Sharp writing the Introduction to Fell's 'Grammar' (1784) which is listed below. Fell's writings in reply to Hugh Farmer are able, but too acrimonious. In 1787, on the retirement of Benjamin Davies, D.D., he accepted the post of classical tutor in his alma mater, and removed (September 1769) to Homerton Academy. It soon became apparent that Fell could not get on well with his students. His apologist speaks of a spirit of insubordination in the academy prior to his appointment. Matters went from bad to worse till at the annual examination in June 1795 charges and counter-charges were brought forward. After much deliberation the governing body, in March 1796, insisted on Fell's retirement, either at midsummer or Christmas. His friends drew up a protest, which the majority declined to record. Fell left the academy at the end of January 1797, and was succeeded by John Berry.

Doubtless Fell had faults of temper; he offended some by a rigid orthodoxy, others he estranged by his republican sympathies. Through the exertions of a London merchant Fell was provided with an annuity of £100. A committee of eight laymen raised some £200 as remuneration for a course of twelve lectures on the evidences. Fell had delivered four of these to crowded audiences in the Scots Church, London Wall, when his health gave way. He died unmarried on 6 Sept. 1797 at Homerton, and was buried at Bunhill Fields on 15 Sept., a funeral oration being delivered by Joseph Brooksbank. The funeral sermon was preached at the Old Jewry on Sunday evening, 24 September, by Henry Hunter, D.D., of the Scots Church.

== Works ==
- Confession of Faith, printed with the services at his ordination, 1770, 8vo.
- Essay on Love of one's Country, 8vo (Hunter).
- Genuine Protestantism, &c., 1773, 8vo (three letters to the Rev. Edward Pickard of Carter Lane, on subscription)
- The Justice … of the Penal Laws … examined, &c., 1774, 8vo.
- A Fourth Letter … on Genuine Protestantism, &c., 1775, 8vo (in reply to Joshua Toulmin, D.D.).
- Dæmoniacs. An Enquiry, &c., 1779, 8vo (against Farmer).
- "Remarks on the Appendix of the Editor of Rowley's Poems", published in Hickford's Observations, &c., 1782, 8vo.
- An Essay towards an English Grammar, &c., 1784, 12mo.
- The Idolatry of Greece and Rome, &c., 1785, 8vo (against Hugh Farmer).
- Lectures on the Evidences of Christianity, &c., 1798, 8vo, two editions same year; third edition, 1799, 8vo (the course was completed by Hunter).

Hunter also mentions reviews of Horne Tooke's Diversions of Purley (1786), and Nicholas Savary's 'Letters on Egypt' (1786), but does not say where they appeared.
