= List of people from Royal Tunbridge Wells =

Royal Tunbridge Wells is a town in Kent, England. The following is a list of those people who were either born or live(d) in Royal Tunbridge Wells, or made some important contribution to the town. As a spa town Royal Tunbridge Wells was a popular resort for the upper classes, including members of the British royal family.

== A ==
- Peter Adolph (1916–1994), Inventor of Subbuteo Table Soccer
- Joe Alwyn (born 1991), actor
- Jonathan Anders (born 1971), Shropshire cricketer
- Anti-Nowhere League, punk rock band

== B ==
- Luke Baldwin (born 1990), rugby player
- Gary Barden (born 1955), musician
- Reverend Thomas Bayes (1702–1761), mathematician, who lived in Ashton Lodge
- Will Bayley (born 1988), paralympian
- C. A. Bayly (1945–2015), historian
- Jeff Beck (1944–2023), musician
- Rachel Beer (1858–1927), newspaper editor
- Compton Bennett (1900–1974), film director
- Golding Bird (1814–1854), medical writer
- Douglas Booth (born 1992), actor and musician
- Frank W. Boreham (1871–1959), Baptist preacher
- Jonathan Bowden (1962–2012), English political activist, orator, writer, and artist
- Jo Brand (born 1957), comedian
- William Thomas Brande (1788–1866), chemist
- Gary Brazil (born 1962), football player
- Christopher Brown (born 1943), British composer
- Nick Brown (born 1950), politician
- Edward Bulwer-Lytton, 1st Baron Lytton (1803–1873), author
- Thomas Harrison Burder (1789–1843), physician and author
- Peter Burton (1924–2007), physicist, philosopher, logician
- Ballard Berkeley, British actor

== C ==
- John Douglas Sutherland Campbell, 9th Duke of Argyll (1845–1914), Governor General of Canada
- Oliver Chris (born 1978), actor
- George Cohen (born 1939), football player
- Paul Condon, Baron Condon (born 1947), police commissioner
- Emma Corrin (born 1995), actor
- Martin Corry (born 1973), rugby player
- Reverend Arthur Shearly Cripps (1869–1952), missionary and writer
- Sidney Elisabeth Croskery (1901–1990), doctor
- Richard Cumberland (1732–1811), dramatist
- Sir Alan Gordon Cunningham (1887–1963), military officer

== D ==
- Iain Dale (born 1962), broadcaster and political commentator
- Gerald Charles Dickens (born 1963), actor and performer
- Marcus Dillistone (born 1961), film director
- Sir Howard Douglas, (1776–1861), military officer
- Keith Douglas (1920–1944), poet
- Roy Douglas (1907–2015), classical composer
- Hugh Dowding, 1st Baron Dowding (1882–1970), Royal Air Force officer

== E ==
- John Cox Dillman Engleheart (1784–1862), miniature painter

== F ==
- Arthur Fagg (1915–1977), cricketer
- Caroline Fry (1787–1846), writer

== G ==
- Thomas Field Gibson (1803–1889), Tunbridge Wells improvement commissioner and Royal Commissioner for the Great Exhibition of 1851
- Jeremy Gilbert-Rolfe, artist and educator
- Jilly Goolden (born 1956), television personality
- Léon Goossens (1897–1988), oboist
- Edward Meyrick Goulburn (1818–1897), clergyman and writer ↑
- David Gower (born 1957), cricketer
- Pauline Gower (1910–1947) pilot, commandant of the Women's Air Transport Auxiliary in Second World War
- Sir Robert Gower, MP (1880–1953)
- Sarah Grand (1854–1943), suffragist and "New Woman" writer
- Sir Tyrone Guthrie (1900–1971), theatrical director

== H ==
- Ker Baillie Hamilton (1804–1889), colonial governor
- Henry Hardinge, 1st Viscount Hardinge (1785–1856), Viceroy of India
- Jake Hill (born 1994), racing driver in the British Touring Car Championship
- Philip Carteret Hill (1821–1894), Nova Scotia politician
- Katrina Hodge, soldier and Miss England 2009

== J ==
- Louise Jameson (born 1951), actress
- Richard Jones (1790–1855), economist

== L ==
- Danny La Rue (1927–2009), entertainer
- Enid Lakeman (1903–1995), political reformer
- Duncan Lamont (1918–1978), actor
- Sydney Turing Barlow Lawford (1865–1953), Lieutenant-General and father of actor Peter Lawford
- Ron Ledger (1920–2004), politician
- Henry Bilson Legge (1708–1764), politician
- Princess Louise, Duchess of Argyll (1848–1939), daughter of Queen Victoria

== M ==
- Annunzio Paolo Mantovani (1905–1980), conductor
- Patrick Mayhew, Baron Mayhew (1929–2016), politician
- Alec McCowen (1925–2017), actor
- Victor McLaglen (1886–1959), actor
- Mark Morriss (born 1971), singer-songwriter

== N ==
- Richard (Beau) Nash (1674–1762), celebrated dandy and leader of fashion
- William Nicholson (born 1948), writer

== O ==
- Sir Charles Ogle (1775–1858), naval officer

== P ==
- Tim Page (1944–2022), photojournalist
- Charles Paulet, 3rd Duke of Bolton (1685–1754), politician
- Tim Pears (born 1956), novelist
- Eliza Phillips (1822/3–1916), conservationist and co-founder of the Royal Society for the Protection of Birds
- Rose Pipette (born 1986), pop singer with The Pipettes

== R ==
- Sir Richard Robinson (1849–1928), businessman and local politician
- Richard Rose (born 1982), footballer

== S ==
- Sir David Lionel Salomons (1851–1925), scientist
- Sarah Sands (born 1961), journalist
- Henry Albert Seymour (1861–1938), secularist, anarchist and gramophone pioneer
- Mary Monica Maxwell-Scott (1852–1920), author
- Dominic Sherwood (born 1990), actor
- Pollie Hirst Simpson MBE (1871–1947), charity organiser and the first agricultural adviser to the National Federation of Women's Institutes (WI)
- Colin Smart (born 1950), rugby player
- Horace Smith (1779–1849), poet and novelist
- Soft Play, musical band
- Jamie Spence (born 1963), golfer
- Sir Thomas Abel Brimage Spratt (1811–1888), naval officer
- Reverend Thomas Roscoe Rede Stebbing (1835–1926), zoologist
- Gary A. Stevens (born 1962), footballer
- Francis Meadow Sutcliffe (1863–1941), photographer

== T ==
- William Temple (1833–1919), recipient of the Victoria Cross
- William Makepeace Thackeray (1811–1863), novelist
- Bob Todd (1921–1992), comedy actor

== V ==
- Krystal Versace (born 2001), Winner of RuPaul's Drag Race UK (Season 3)
- Sid Vicious (1957–1979), musician

== W ==
- Virginia Wade (born 1945), tennis player
- H T Waghorn (1842–1930), cricket historian
- Scott Wagstaff (born 1990), footballer
- Charity Wakefield (born 1981), actress
- Arthur Waley (1889–1966), Orientalist
- Nick Wallace (born 1972), writer
- Frank Weare (1896–1971), World War I flying ace
- William Webber (1800–1875), surgeon
- James Whitbourn (born 1963), composer

== Z ==
- Andy Zaltzman, comedian and writer
- Helen Zaltzman, co-host of popular podcast, Answer me this
