= Henry Mayo (minister) =

Henry Mayo (1733–1793) was an English dissenting minister and tutor, known also as a magazine editor.

== Life ==
Born in the west of England, Mayo came from Plymouth to London in 1756, and was admitted to the dissenting academy in Mile End Road. He preached for a short time at Northampton, and then became (1762) the pastor of the Independent congregation in Nightingale Lane, Wapping, London. He continued in charge there for the rest of his life.

In 1763 Mayo was engaged in controversy with John Gill on infant baptism. He strongly opposed the efforts of the 1770s, led by Edward Pickard, to find alternate religious tests in place of subscription to the 39 Articles. He edited The London Magazine from about 1775 to 1783; James Boswell and Edward Dilly were partners in it. Mayo knew Samuel Johnson socially through the Dillys, and Boswell gave an account of a conversation they had from 1773 in his Life of Johnson, which earned Mayo the nickname "the Literary Anvil".

Mayo held the degrees of D.D. and LL.D., and on the death of Thomas Gibbons in 1785 was chosen one of the tutors at Homerton Academy. He died at his house in Wellclose Square 4 April 1793, and was buried in Bunhill Fields.

== Family ==
Mayo was twice married, first to Jane Marder, the widow of Mr. Martin, a West India merchant, with one daughter; and secondly to Jane Belfour, and had issue two daughters.

== Notes ==
Attribution

This article incorporates text from a publication now in the public domain: Lee, Sidney, ed. (1894). "Mayo, Henry". Dictionary of National Biography. Vol. 37. London: Smith, Elder & Co.
