= Wymondley House =

House in Wymondley, Hertfordshire, England

Coordinates: 51.93215°N 0.239249°W

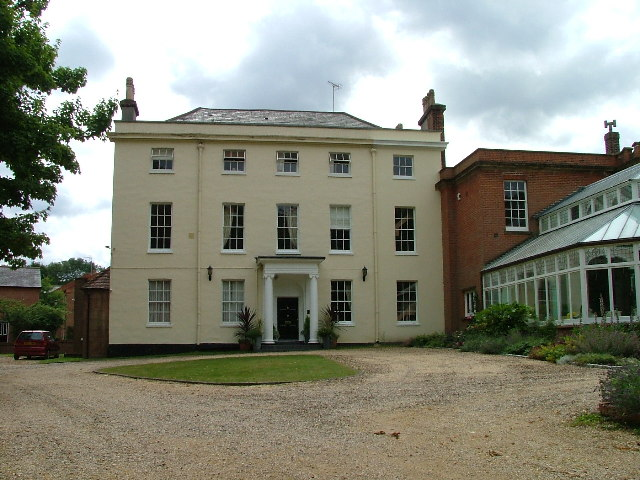
Wymondley House in 2005

Wymondley House is a building in the North Hertfordshire village of Little Wymondley that was built in 1724. At one time the home of a dissenting academy called Wymondley College, it was classified as a Grade II* listed building in 1968.

== History ==
Wymondley House was first occupied by John Pym, (Note: It has been claimed that John Pym might have had family connections to John "Patriot" Pym, one of five Parliamentarians impeached in 1642, but no evidence has been found to verify this and it seems unlikely.) a wealthy barrister, in 1724. He had enclosed 8 acres (3.2 ha) of common land at Little Wymondley and appears to have won a court battle to retain it, subsequently erecting the house there. After his death in 1770, the house remained in his family's possession for a further 29 years.

In 1799, a philanthropic trust established by William Coward took possession of the building as a replacement for the dissenting academy that it had funded in Northampton and which had closed. The Coward Trust spent £4,258 on purchase and renovation, enlarging it to accommodate two tutors and 24 students in their pursuit of studies for dissenting ministry. The trust also determined that the institution should be known as Wymondley House, although in practice even in its own day it was more commonly referred to as Wymondley College or Wymondley Academy.

Following the closure of the academy around 1832, Wymondley House became a boys' boarding school and then, in 1880, was used for its original purpose as a private house. A ballroom and conservatory were added in 1904 and in 1930 it became an approved school. Used in part to house evacuees from London during World War II, the building then became a Roman Catholic school and thereafter commercial premises. As of 2019, it is once more privately owned housing.

The structure was listed Grade II* in 1968.
