= Coward College =

Dissenting academy in London, England

Coordinates: 51.523°N 0.131°W

Coward College was a dissenting academy at Byng Place, Torrington Square, London. Intended for the education of future nonconformist ministers of religion, it was in operation from 1833 to 1850. It was the successor to Wymondley College in Little Wymondley, Hertfordshire and the precursor, via a merger with two other colleges, of New College London.

== History ==
Thomas Morell, who had been an Independent minister at St Neots in Huntingdonshire, had become the last theological tutor at Wymondley College in 1821 and had restored its reputation after many years of internal discord, mostly relating to accusations of heterodoxy. In December 1831, the trustees who managed the college on behalf of a charitable trust established by William Coward discussed moving the institution to London to take advantage of access to teaching at the University of London, which had recently opened. A suitable location was soon found at Byng Place, Torrington Square, the site at Wymondley was closed and sold, and in 1833 the college moved. The name was changed from Wymondley College to Coward College.

The new premises were a part of Thomas Cubitt's development of Gordon Square in Bloomsbury and comprised a row of three houses that were bought for £2,200. It was adjacent to what is now Dr Williams's Library and was capable of boarding 16 students.

Morell, who had initially been sceptical of moving, became theological tutor at the new institution. However, he no longer had an assistant, as had been the case at Wymondley, because it was thought that he could cope alone if students also had access to the university. The new college would concentrate on teaching just theology, whereas Wymondley had also taught subjects such as algebra, general history, geography, logic and natural philosophy.

The college began with a roll of 13 students, 11 of whom had transferred from Wymondley and a further two who had been accepted on a probationary basis. While demand for admissions often exceeded capacity in its early years, it tailed off later to the point that the trustees promised the governors at Mill Hill School that they would pay £50 to any pupil who took up further study at Byng Place. In that same year, 1847, the trust stopped its provision of funding matriculation fees to prospective students and required that they had already been accepted for study by the university before they sought membership of the college.

It proved to be an unhappy experience for Morell: the trustees lost confidence in him and he died in 1840 shortly before the time they had agreed for his departure. He was replaced by Thomas William Jenkyn, who fared little better after an initial grace period. Now in a busy metropolis rather than the relatively isolated village of Little Wymondley, and with the facilities of the university as a comparison, the students increasingly perceived the college offerings, both in teaching and equipment, as being inferior. The library, however, based on that originally created by Philip Doddridge, remained a significant and appealing feature. Those students meant to be at Morell's theology classes became less interested and more disruptive, if they attended at all, and as early as 1836 the trustees suspended their award of £5 to each student because examination results were unsatisfactory. Fines of one shilling, intended to enforce a 10 pm curfew, became seen by students as a necessary expenditure rather than a deterrent, and the trustees clashed with students over their demands to be allowed to associate with their peers at other institutions.

Coward College was the last in a line of peripatetic institutions run by the Coward Trust prior to a merger with Highbury and Homerton colleges to form New College London. A decision to close the college was made as early as June 1849 and its remaining 14 students were transferred to New College. Historia Simon Dixon says that

Coward College had been a bold attempt to raise the academic standard of the education provided to candidates for the ministry supported by the founder's Trust. The later careers of many who studied there indicate that the experiment was in some measure a success. However, the reputation of the theological department relied heavily upon the accomplishments of its tutor, and neither Morell nor Jenkyn appears to have been ideally suited to the post.

The building at Byng Place was leased to the Commissioners for Works and Public Buildings in 1852. In the 1880s the secretary of the trustees, Revd Joshua Harrison, was approached by Eleanor Grove who arranged for the building to be used by the new College Hall which allowed women to attend university classes.

The building still stands, although in modified form.

== Notable people ==
70 students are known to have studied at Coward College. Notable among them are:

- John Curwen, who had transferred from Wymondley
- Joseph Edkins
- Joseph Mullens
- Henry Robert Reynolds
- James Ewing Ritchie
- Matthew Atmore Sherring

== See also ==
- Daventry Academy
