= James Bardsley =

James Bardsley may refer to:

- James Lomax Bardsley (1801–1876), English physician
- James Bardsley (priest) (1805–1886), English cleric of evangelical views
