= William Parry (tutor) =

William Parry (1754–1819) was a Welsh Congregational minister and tutor.

== Life ==
Parry was born on 25 November 1754 at Abergavenny, Monmouthshire, where his father was a deacon of the Baptist congregation. Around 1760 the family moved to London; his father was in the woollen business, and lived in Stepney. On the advice of Samuel Brewer, Parry entered Homerton Academy on 8 February 1774, as a candidate for the Congregational ministry. He was received into the church at Stepney on 29 April 1774, soon afterwards preached with success at Gravesend in Kent, and declined an invitation from the church there.

In 1780 Parry finished his course, left Homerton, and was ordained to the ministry at Little Baddow in Essex. While there he kept a school, and helped to organise a benevolent society. In 1790 he was active in efforts to obtain the repeal of the Test Act and Corporation Act.

In 1795 Parry supported the formation of the Essex Congregational Union. But his congregation fell off, after the emigration to North America of many of its leading members. He then accepted the tutorship of the academy of the Coward Trust, about to be removed in 1799 to Wymondley Academy in Hertfordshire. This post he held for the rest of his life.

Parry died on 9 January 1819, after a few weeks' illness, and was buried on 21 January in the ground adjoining the Congregational church at Hitchin.

== Works ==
Parry published three letters to Lord Aylesford, chairman of a meeting held at Warwick on 2 February 1790 to oppose the removal of the dissenters' disabilities. He continued to publish tracts on religion and politics, until within a few years of his death. His works include:

- Thoughts on such Penal Religious Statutes as affect the Protestant Dissenters, London, 1791.
- Vindication of Public and Social Worship, London, 1792 (in answer to Gilbert Wakefield's Enquiry into the Expediency and Propriety of Public and Social Worship).
- An Enquiry into the Nature and Extent of the Inspiration of the Writers of the New Testament, London, 1797, 1822.
- Strictures on the Origin of Moral Evil, London, 1808 (in answer to Edward Williams's Predestination to Life.). It was replied to by Rev. Thomas Hill in Animadversions on Parry's Strictures, when Parry retorted in Vindication of Strictures on the Origin of Moral Evil, London, 1808.

Seventeen volumes of Parry's lectures in manuscript went to the Historical Library at New College London.

== Family ==
Parry was twice married:

1. In 1780, to Rachel, daughter of Edward Hickman, minister of Back Street Independent Chapel, Hitchin, from 1758 to 1771; she died in 1791, leaving him with four children; and
2. In 1793 or 1794, to Susannah, daughter of the Rev. William Lincoln of Bury, who survived him.

== Notes ==
Attribution

This article incorporates text from a publication now in the public domain: Lee, Sidney, ed. (1895). "Parry, William (1754-1819)". Dictionary of National Biography. Vol. 43. London: Smith, Elder & Co.
