= Cyclopædia of Practical Medicine =

British monthly medical journal

The Cyclopædia of Practical Medicine was a British monthly medical journal, first published in 1832. It was divided into alphabetical articles, and came to four volumes, part-published and then completed by 1835. The volumes were:

1. Abd–Ele (1832);
2. Eme–Isc (1833);
3. Jau–Sma (1834);
4. Sof–Yaw (1835).

It was announced with the co-operation of a large number of practising physicians, and with the intention of producing an adapted American edition by Carey & Lea. The editors were John Conolly, John Forbes, and Alexander Tweedie; historical notes were added, by John Bostock and William Pulteney Alison. A later American edition was edited by Robley Dunglison. Contributors to the first edition included James Lomax Bardsley, Joseph Brown, Thomas Harrison Burder, Harry William Carter, John Cheyne, James Clark, Charles Locock, James Cowles Prichard, Peter Mark Roget, and Charles James Blasius Williams.

The rival Dictionary of Practical Medicine was a project of James Copland, launched by part-publishing in 1832.
