= John Mason (minister) =

- Born: 1706; Great Dunmow, England, Kingdom of England
- Died: 10 February 1763 (aged 56–57); Cheshunt, England, Great Britain
- Parent: John Mason

John Mason (1706 – 10 February 1763) was an English nonconformist minister and author.

== Life ==
Born at Dunmow, Essex, he was son of John Mason (died 1723), Independent minister there, and subsequently at Spaldwick, Huntingdonshire; his grandfather was John Mason (died 1694). He began training for the ministry under John Jennings. Aged 17 when Jennings died, he may have completed his studies in London.

Mason's first employment was as tutor and chaplain in the family of Samuel Feake, near Hatfield, Hertfordshire. In 1729, he became minister of the Presbyterian congregation at Dorking, Surrey. He moved in July 1746, to succeed John Oakes as minister of a congregation at Carbuckle Street (or Crossbrook), Cheshunt, formed by a union in 1733 of Presbyterians and Independents.

Mason died at Cheshunt on 10 February 1763, and was buried in the parish churchyard. His funeral sermon was preached on 20 February by John Hodge, D.D., Presbyterian minister at Crosby Square, London.

== Views ==
Mason's theological positions were for the most part conservative, and moderately stated. He claimed the theory of Christ's temptation put forth in 1761 by Hugh Farmer; but Mason retained the belief in the reality of miracles performed by Satanic agency, against Farmer.

== Works ==
Mason published, besides separate sermons, 1740–1756:

- A Plain and Modest Plea for Christianity, 1743, (anon., effectively a reply to Christianity not founded on Argument, 1742, by Henry Dodwell.
- Self-Knowledge: a Treatise, 1745, six editions before 1763; of later editions, that of 1811, edited by J. M. Good, with Life, has been considered accurate. It has been translated into Welsh, Hunan-Adnabyddiaeth, Carmarthen, 1771.
- An Essay on Elocution, 1748; two editions same year; 3rd edit. 1751; 4th edit. 1761.
- An Essay on the Power of Numbers and the Principles of Harmony in Poetical Compositions, 1749; 2nd edit. 1761.
- An Essay on the Power and Harmony of Prosaic Numbers, 1749; 2nd edit. 1761.
- The Lord's Day Evening Entertainment, 1752, 4 vols. (52 practical discourses).
- A Letter to a Friend on his Entrance on the Ministerial Office, &c., 1753.
- The Student and Pastor, 1755; 2nd edit. [1760].
- Fifteen Discourses, Devotional and Practical, 1758.
- Christian Morals, 1761, 2 vols.

Posthumous was The Tears of the Dying annihilated by the Hope of Heaven, a Dialogue. 1826, ed., with Memoir, by John Evans. Sermons by Mason are in The Protestant System, 1758, vol. ii.; in The Practical Preacher, 1762, vol. ii.; and in Sermons for Families, 1808, ed. James Hews Bransby.

Mason was said to have received, for his early works and at the suggestion of John Walker, D.D., classical tutor at Independent College, Homerton, the diploma of M.A. from Edinburgh University. He edited Sermons to Young People, 1747, by John Oakes, his predecessor at Cheshunt. He undertook the training of students for the ministry. Selections from his tutorial lectures were published in the Protestant Dissenter's Magazine,’1794–6. They begin September 1794, p. 190, under the heading Lectiones Polemicæ. By the late Rev. John Mason, A.M., of Cheshunt.

== Family ==
Mason married at Dorking in 1732 Mary Walters, daughter of the Rev. James Walters of Uxbridge. His niece married Peter Good, Congregationalist minister, and was mother of John Mason Good.
