= David Ford =

David or Dave Ford may refer to:

== Arts and entertainment ==
- David Ford (actor) (1925–1983), American character actor
- Terry Harknett (a.k.a. "David Ford", 1936–2019), British novelist
- David Ford (musician) (born 1978), British singer-songwriter and guitarist

== Sports ==
- David Ford (footballer) (born 1945), English professional footballer
- Dave Ford (born 1956), American baseball player
- David Ford (canoeist) (born 1967), Canadian whitewater slalom kayaker
- David Ford (golfer) (born 2002), American golfer

== Others ==
- David Everard Ford (1797–1875), English minister, author, and hymn composer
- David Ford (civil servant) (1935–2017), British civil servant; last non-Chinese Chief Secretary of Hong Kong
- David Ford (marketing scientist) (born 1944), British organizational theorist
- David F. Ford (born 1948), Irish Anglican theologian
- David C. Ford (1949–2008), American politician from Indiana
- David Ford (politician) (born 1951), British politician; former leader of the Alliance Party of Northern Ireland

== See also ==
- David Forde (disambiguation)
