= Hana Catherine Mullens =

- Born: 1826; Chinsurah, India
- Died: 1861 (aged 34–35); Calcutta, British India
- Occupations: Author, missionary, educator
- Spouse: Joseph Mullens (m. 1845)
- Children: Alice Maria Mullens; Eliot Mullens; Kenneth Mullens; Lucy Ramsay Mullens; Kate Hasell Mullens
- Parents: Alphonse Francois Lacroix (father); Hannah Herklots (mother)

Hana Catherine Mullens (1826–1861) was a European Christian missionary, educator, translator and writer. She was a leader of zenana missions, setting up schools for girls and writing what is arguably the first novel in Bengali. She spent most of her life in Calcutta, then the capital of British India (now Kolkata, West Bengal), and was fluent in the Bengali language.

== Early life and education ==
Hana Catherine Lacroix was born in Calcutta. Her father was Alphonse François Lacroix, a Swiss Protestant missionary who went to Chinsurah in 1821 to preach Christianity on behalf of the London Missionary Society (LMS). Her mother, Hannah Herklots, was from a Dutch colonial family.

Hana grew up in the mission in Bhowanipore, one of the Dihi Panchannagram villages then on the suburbs of the capital of the Raj. She learned Bengali, the language of her amah and other servants, at a period when Sanskrit was used only for liturgical and religious purposes; and Bengali was only a language of conversation. At the age of 12 she started teaching Bengali in a newly established school. She was educated mostly by her parents until the family travelled back to Europe when she was 15. Living in London gave her the opportunity to study at the Home and Colonial School Society, where she trained to be a teacher, and then returned to Calcutta.

== Career ==
=== Educator ===
In 1845, she married Joseph Mullens also of the LMS, who had travelled out to India on the same ship as her father. The missionary couple continued their work in Calcutta for a dozen years. Using her fluency in Bengali, Hana Catherine Mullens was head of a girls' boarding school, and taught Bible classes to women.

It was at the invitation of Rev. Mullens, chairing the Bengal Missionary Conference of 1855, that Rev. John Fordyce first reported on his female teaching initiative in the zenana. (The word refers to the secluded living quarters of girls and women, similar to purdah.) Hana Catherine Mullens became known for her devotion to the outreach programme of the zenana missions. Shortly after the conference, she persuaded the widow of a Hindu doctor to accommodate zenana teaching in her home, and then negotiated other similar arrangements. These Indian Christians were known as Bible women.

In 1858, she and her husband visited Britain to spread the word about their missionary work in India. By the time of her death in 1861, she had four zenanas under her care and was visiting a further eleven every afternoon.

=== Writer ===
She is credited by some with having written the first novel in the Bengali language, Phulmani O Karunar Bibaran (Description of Phulmani and Karuna), in 1852. It was aimed at native Christian women. This book was published six years before Peary Chand Mitra published his Alaler Gharer Dulal. There are other claimants to earlier novels. Nabababubilas published by Bhabani Charan Bandyopadhyay in 1825 is claimed as one but others think of it as being merely a story. Similar reservation has also been expressed about Phulmani O Karunar Bibaran. The first Bengali woman to write a novel was Swarnakumari Devi, with her Deepnirban in 1876.

Mullens wrote another book, The Missionary on the Ganges or What is Christianity, in both English and Bengali. She translated Charlotte Maria Tucker's Daybreak in Britain into Bengali.

== See also ==
- Bengali Renaissance
