= James Ewing Ritchie =

English journalist and writer

- Born: 1 May 1820; Wrentham, Suffolk, England
- Died: 1898 (aged 77–78)
- Other name: Christopher Crayon
- Occupation: Writer

James Ewing Ritchie (1 May 1820 – 1898) was an English journalist and writer.

Born in Wrentham, Suffolk, the son of Reverend Andrew Ritchie, he was educated at Coward College and University College, London. He became an author of travel books and political biographies. Seven of his books were about nineteenth-century London.

== Bibliography ==
- Northern antiquities (1847)
- Freehold land societies; their history, present position, and claims (1853)
- The new Sunday liquor law vindicated (1855)
- The public-house trade as it is: or An epitome of the evidence taken before a committee of the house of commons in the parliamentary sessions of 1853-4 (1855)
- Ratcliffe-Highway (1857)
- The London pulpit (1858)
- The night side of London (1858)
- Here and there in London (1859)
- About London (1860)
- Modern statesmen, or sketches from the strangers' gallery of the house of commons (1861)
- The life of Richard Cobden: a biography (1865)
- The life and times of viscount Palmerston (1866)
- British senators: or, political sketches, past and present (1869)
- The religious life of London (1870)
- The life and discoveries of David Livingstone (1876)
- On the track of the pilgrim fathers; or: holidays in Holland (1876)
- The cruise of the Elena; or, yachting in the Hebrides (1877)
- The life and discoveries of David Livingstone L.L.D., F.R.G.S. (1877)
- Christopher Crayon's Christmas stories (1881)
- Imperialism in South Africa (1881)
- Famous city men (1884)
- To Canada with emigrants: a record of actual experiences (1885)
- The life of the Right Hon. William Ewart Gladstone (1886)
- Pictures of Canadian life: a record of actual experiences (1886)
- The spring at Bournemouth (1886)
- Hydropathy and health: or, sketches of hydropathic establishments (1888)
- Our Premiers. From Walpole to Salisbury (1888)
- An Australian ramble, or, a summer in Australia (1890)
- Brighter South Africa: or life at the Cape and Natal (1892)
- East Anglia: personal recollections and historical associations (1893)
- Some of our east coast towns (1893)
- Crying for the light or fifty years ago (1896)
- The Cities of the Dawn: Naples - Athens - Pompeii - Constantinople (1897)
- Christopher Crayon's recollections (1898)
- The real Gladstone: an anecdotal biography (1898)
