= Joseph Brown (physician) =

English physician

- Born: September 1784; North Shields
- Died: 19 November 1868 (aged 84)
- Occupation: Physician

Joseph Brown (September 1784 – 19 November 1868) was an English physician.

== Biography ==
Brown was born at North Shields in September 1784, and studied medicine at the University of Edinburgh and also in London. Though the son of a quaker, and educated as such, he entered the army medical service, was attached to Wellington's staff in the Peninsular war, and was present at Busaco, Albuera, Victoria, and the Pyrenees, gaining high commendation for his services. After Waterloo he remained with the army of occupation in France. Subsequently, he again studied at Edinburgh, and graduated M.D. in 1819. He settled at Sunderland, and took a leading part in local philanthropy and politics, being a strong liberal and a zealous but not bigoted Christian. He was once mayor of Sunderland and a borough magistrate, and also for many years physician to the Sunderland and Bishop wearmouth Infirmary. He was highly cultured, of dignified manners, yet deeply sympathetic with the poor. He died on 19 November 1868. Besides numerous contributions to medical reviews, and several articles in the ‘Cyclopædia of Practical Medicine.' Brown wrote:

- ‘Medical Essays on Fever, Inflammation, &c.,’ London, 1828.
- ‘A Defence of Revealed Religion,’ 1851, designed to vindicate the miracles of the Old and New Testaments.
- ‘Memories of the Past and Thoughts on the Present Age,’ 1863.
- ‘The Food of the People, with a Postscript on the Diet of Old Age,’ 1865.
