= Abraham Taylor =

English minister and dissenting academy tutor

Abraham Taylor (fl. 1727–1740), was an English Independent minister and dissenting academy tutor, known as a controversialist.

== Life ==
He was a son of Richard Taylor (d. 1717), independent minister at Little Moorfields, London. His name occurs in a list (December 1727) of "approved ministers" among congregationalists in the London district, and in 1728 he became minister at Deptford.

Taylor's writings attracted the notice of William Coward, who selected him as one of nine preachers for a weekly lecture in defence of Calvinism at Paved Alley, Lime Street, in the City of London. While these lectures were proceeding in 1730–1, Taylor was ordained (1 January 1731), having been selected as divinity tutor for a new dissenting academy, established by the King's Head Society (itself founded 1730). It was an extended course of study (six years), in which more stress was to be laid on theological orthodoxy than on other learning.

Soon Taylor clashed on a point of Calvinist theology with John Gill, another of the Lime Street lecturers. When Coward first projected (early in 1735) his scheme of founding a college, after his death, Taylor appeared a rival to Philip Doddridge as its head. He obtained a degree of D.D. about the same time as Doddridge (1736). Hugh Farmer believed in mid-1737 that Taylor was favoured; Samuel Clarke and David Jennings deprecated his influence with Coward.

Taylor, however, mismanaged his money affairs. He lost character with Coward, and ceased to be tutor in 1740; he ended his ministry at Deptford soon after. He died in poverty, when and where being unclear.

== Works ==
Taylor's first publication, an attack on Samuel Chandler, appeared in 1729. It was entitled A Letter to a Friend, occasioned by a rhapsody delivered in the Old Jewry by a reverend bookseller [Chandler] … at the shutting up his evening entertainment for the last winter season, 1729. In 1730 he published a Letter in reply to the Enquiry (into the causes of the decline of dissent) by Strickland Gough.

Among Taylor's other publications (mainly sermons) was A Practical Treatise of Saving Faith, 1730, 3 parts. Appended to his funeral sermon (1733) for John Hurrion is Some Account and it was reprinted with Hurrion's Works, 1823, 3 vols. The Lime Street lectures (delivered from 12 November 1730 to 8 April 1731) were collected, 1762, in 2 vols.

== Notes ==
Attribution

This article incorporates text from a publication now in the public domain: Lee, Sidney, ed. (1898). "Taylor, Abraham". Dictionary of National Biography. Vol. 55. London: Smith, Elder & Co.
