= Samuel Burder =

Anglican clergyman and writer

Samuel Burder (8 January 1772 – 21 November 1837) was an Anglican clergyman and writer on religious subjects.

== Life ==
Burder was the son of William Burder and Mary James, and was related to George Burder. Brought up as a dissenter, he was minister of an independent congregation at St Albans. In 1808 he was admitted to Clare Hall, Cambridge, but his name does not appear in the list of graduates. Having conformed to the Church of England, he was ordained in the autumn of 1808 by Bishop Barrington of Durham. He was preacher in London at St Margaret Lothbury, at St Dunstan's, Fleet Street, and afterwards at Christ Church Newgate. He was appointed (before 1816) chaplain to Prince Edward, Duke of Kent and Strathearn, and in 1827 to the Earl of Bridgewater. He died on 21 November 1837.

== Works ==
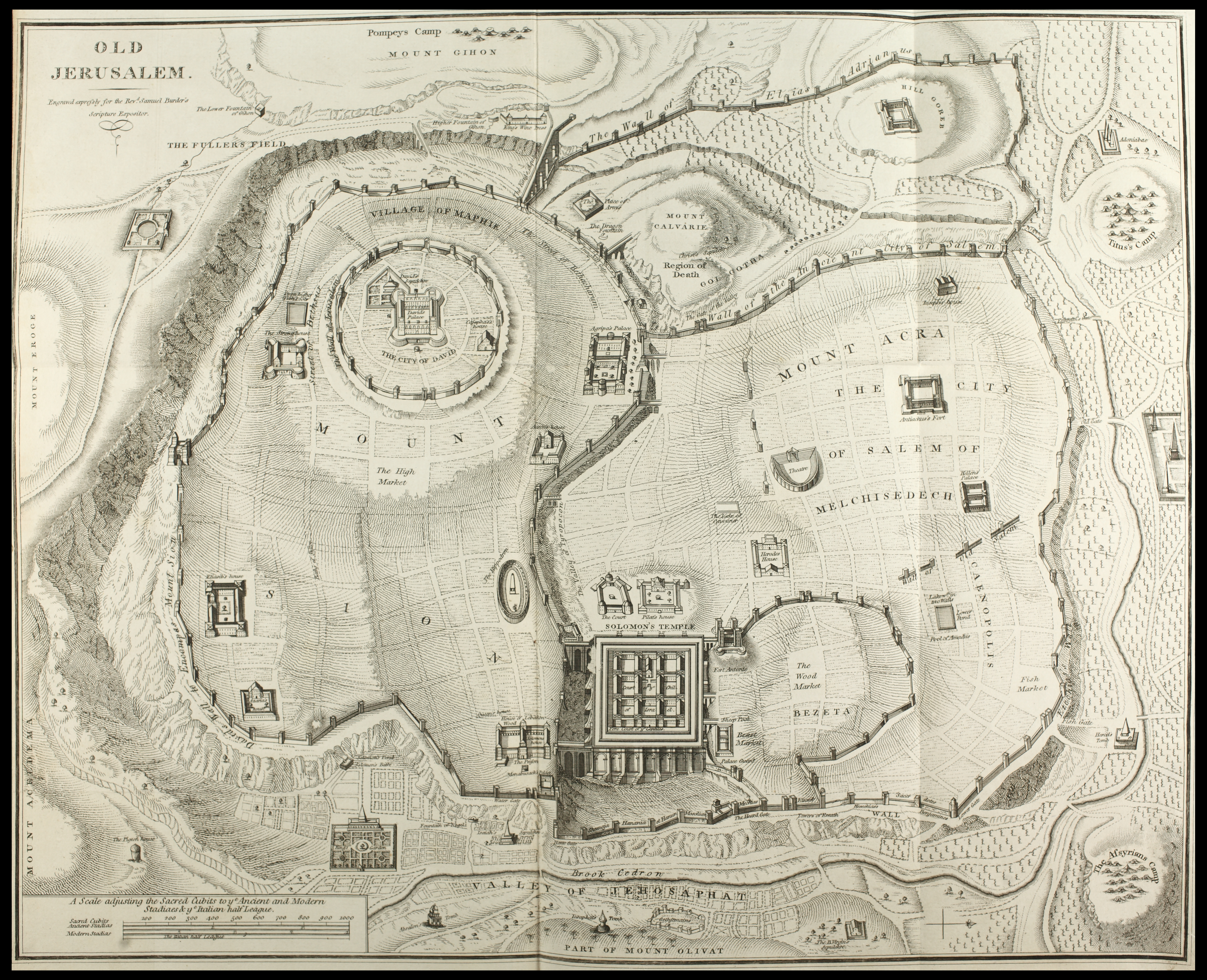
"Old Jerusalem": illustration from The Scripture Expositor

Burder's works on oriental customs were popular compilations. Burder was the author of:

1. The Moral Law ... an Antidote to Antinomianism, 1795.
2. A Christian Directory, 1800.
3. Owen's Display of Arminianism.
4. Oriental Customs in illustration of the Scriptures, 1802 and 1807; several editions and a German translation by Rosenmüller, 1819.
5. The Scripture Expositor, 1809.
6. Oriental Literature applied to the Illustration of the Sacred Scriptures, 1812.
7. Memoirs of eminently Pious British Women, 1815.
8. Oriental Customs, 1831.
