= Henry Forster Burder =

English nonconformist minister

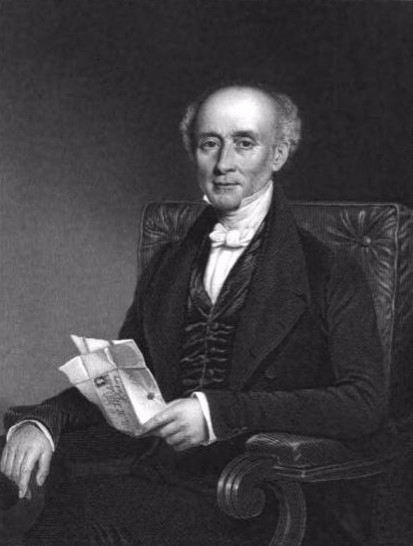
- Henry Forster Burder, 1842 engraving
- Born: 1783; Duisburg, Germany
- Died: 1864 (aged 80–81)
- Occupation: Nonconformist minister

Henry Forster Burder, D.D. (1783–1864) was an English nonconformist minister.

== Life ==
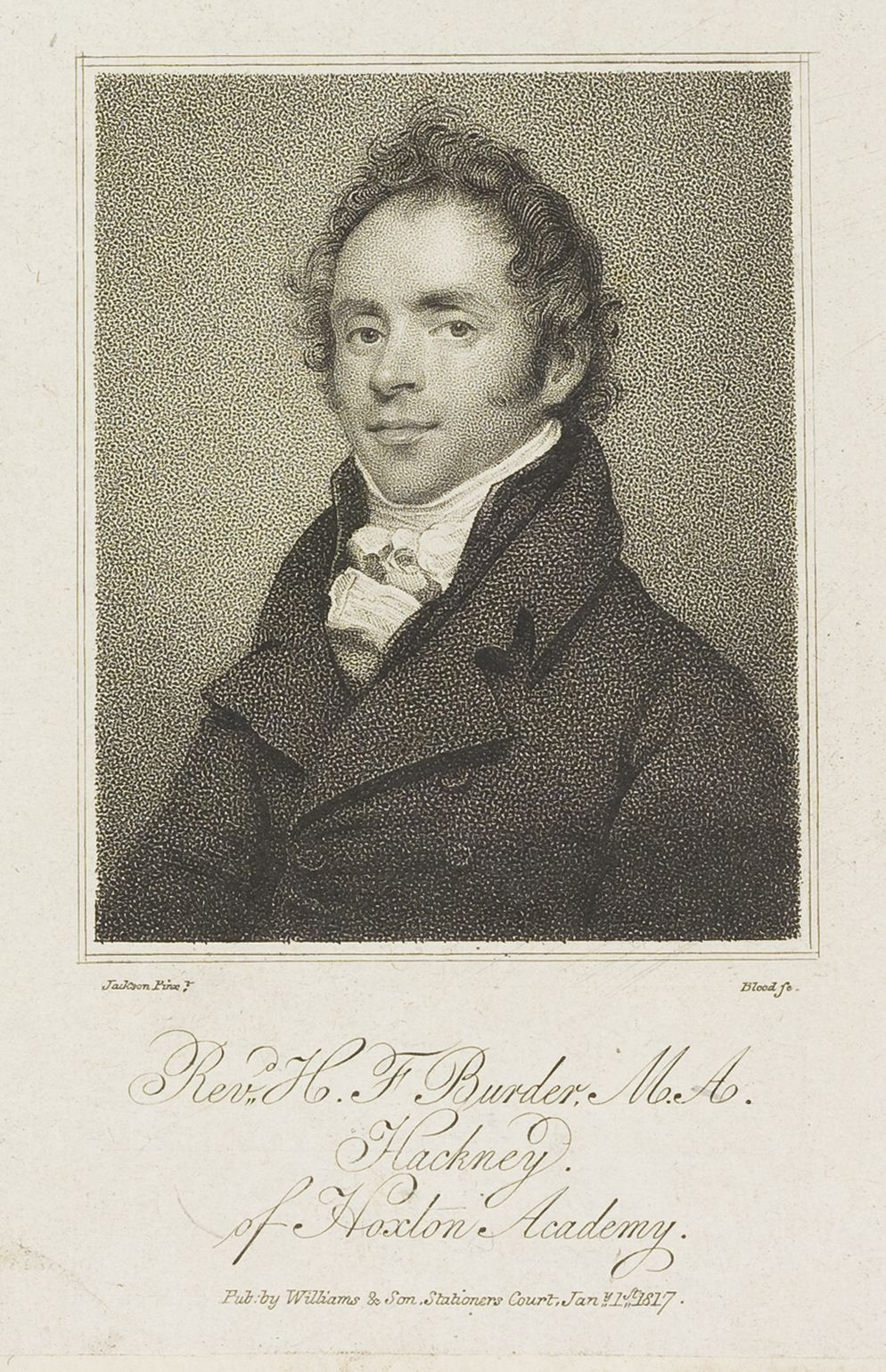
Burder (1817)

The eldest son of the Rev. George Burder, and brother of Thomas Harrison Burder, he was born 27 November 1783, at Coventry. He was articled in 1798 to a wholesale firm based in Nottingham and London.

In London Burder attended the Weigh-house Chapel, and decided to devote himself to the ministry. He became a student in Hoxton Academy, and then in 1804 entered the University of Glasgow, where he took his M.A. degree in 1807, and subsequently that of D.D. After his graduation, Burder became classical tutor at Wymondley College, as a colleague of William Parry.

Burder resigned as tutor in 1808. By October 1811, he was assistant to Samuel Palmer at St. Thomas's Square Congregational Chapel, Hackney, and on Palmer's death was ordained to his pastorate on 2 March 1814.

From 1810 Burder also filled the chair of philosophy and mathematics at Hoxton Academy, until it moved to Highbury in 1830. Burder gave an address at the opening of the new Highbury College building, in September 1826.John Stoughton was one of his students, at the end of this period, and commented that Burder was influenced by Dugald Stewart. Another student of this time was Henry Rogers.

Burder was one of the founders of the Congregational Union in 1831; and in 1834 he advocated breaking traditional links with Presbyterians and Baptists. In 1844. he was chairman of the Union. He remained at Hackney till 1852, delivering on 26 December 1852, A Pastor's Farewell, published 1853. His congregation presented him with a purse of £1,000, with which a Burder scholarship was founded at New College, London. He then lived in the house of his eldest son at Hatcham Park, where he died 29 December 1864. He is buried at the non-denominational Abney Park Cemetery, in Stoke Newington.

== Works ==
Burder had many sermons printed in collections. His main works were:

- The Scripture Character of God, or Discourses on the Divine Attributes, London, 1822.
- Mental Discipline, or Hints on the Cultivation of Intellectual Habits, addressed particularly to Students in Theology and Young Preachers, London, 1822, and other editions.
- Lectures on the Pleasures of Religion, London, 1823, Philadelphia, 1839, &c.
- Lectures on the Essentials of Religion, personal, domestic, and social, London, 1825.
- A collection Psalms and Hymns, principally for Public Worship, London, 1826, third edition, 1845, and others.
- Pastoral Discourses on Revivals in Religion, London, 1829.
- Memoir of the Rev. George Burder, London, 1833.
- Notes on the Prophecies of the Apocalypse, London, 1849.
- Sermons preached at St. Thomas's Square Chapel, Hackney, London, 1854.

== Family ==
Burder was twice married: first, in 1810, to Ann, eldest daughter of Joseph Hardcastle of Hatcham House, New Cross, London, who died in 1827, leaving a daughter and three sons; and secondly, in 1833, to Mary, eldest daughter of the Rev. J. Tayler of Whitlinge, Worcestershire, who died in 1859 and is buried with her husband at Abney Park Cemetery.

One of his sons, George Bernard Burder (1814–1881) converted to Roman Catholicism and became Abbot of Mount Saint Bernard Abbey in Leicestershire.
