= Joseph Mullens =

Joseph Mullens (2 September 1820 – 10 July 1879) worked with the London Missionary Society (LMS) in India.

== Life ==
Joseph Mullens, son of Richard Mullens, was born on 2 September 1820 in London. He studied at Coward College, a dissenting academy that trained people for nonconformist ministry, in 1837 and graduated from the University of London, to which the college was affiliated, in 1841. He then undertook further study in Edinburgh with the intention of working for the LMS in India.

Mullens was ordained at Barbican Chapel as a Congregational minister in September 1843 and soon after sailed for India. He shared the journey with a Swiss missionary, Alphonse François Lacroix, who was returning to Calcutta after taking leave, and joined Lacroix's mission at Bhawanipur, near Calcutta. On 19 June 1845, Mullens married Hannah Catherine, an evangelist daughter of Lacroix who spoke fluent Bengali. In the following year, Mullens became pastor at the church in Bhawanipur.

In 1857 he became a member of the governing body of Calcutta University.

Probably a more gifted publicist than he was a missionary, Mullens did not restrict himself to promoting the interests and achievements of the LMS but rather did so for Protestant missionaries in general. This ecumenism was later evidenced in 1860 when he attended a conference of Protestant missionaries in Liverpool and pleaded with those present to set aside their doctrinal differences for the greater good of serving the cause of Christianity in India. His efforts in producing statistics relating to work done in India were significant to the fundraising abilities of missionary societies in Britain.

Mullens was secretary at that 1860 conference, having returned to England on leave in 1858 and previously been a significant figure in the similar conferences in India that began in 1855. He returned to India not long after his attendance at Liverpool and his wife, Hannah, died there on 21 November 1861. It was in that year that he was awarded an honorary degree of DD by Williams College, Massachusetts.

From 1865, Mullens was joint foreign secretary of the LMS. He undertook a tour of the society's missions in India and China during that year and the next, and in 1868, having been awarded a further honorary DD, this time from Edinburgh University, he became the sole foreign secretary of the LMS. A tour of the United States and Canada followed in 1870 as he sought further to promote the activities of his society, then in 1873 he made a tour of LMS missionaries based in Madagascar.

Mullens' last significant trip was in 1879, when he began travelling to Lake Tanganyika with two inexperienced missionaries who were to replace the deceased incumbent there. He caught a cold and died on 10 July at Chakombe, being buried at a mission run by the Church Missionary Society at Mpwapwa two days later.

== Publications ==
Mullens studied Hinduism so that he was in a better position to counter the arguments of Indian people. From these studies, he was able to write works such as Vedantism, Brahmism and Christianity Examined and Compared (1852) and Missions in South India: Visited and Described. He also wrote The Religious Aspects of Hindu Philosophy (1860), which enabled other missionaries to benefit from his learning.

Together with his wife, he prepared Brief Memorials of the Revd A. F. Lacroix, which was published in 1862 after her death. He also wrote Twelve Months in Madagascar, published in 1875 and based on his 1873 tour to that country.
