= Alphonse François Lacroix =

Swiss Protestant missionary

Alphonse François Lacroix (1799–1859) was a Swiss missionary in Bengal.

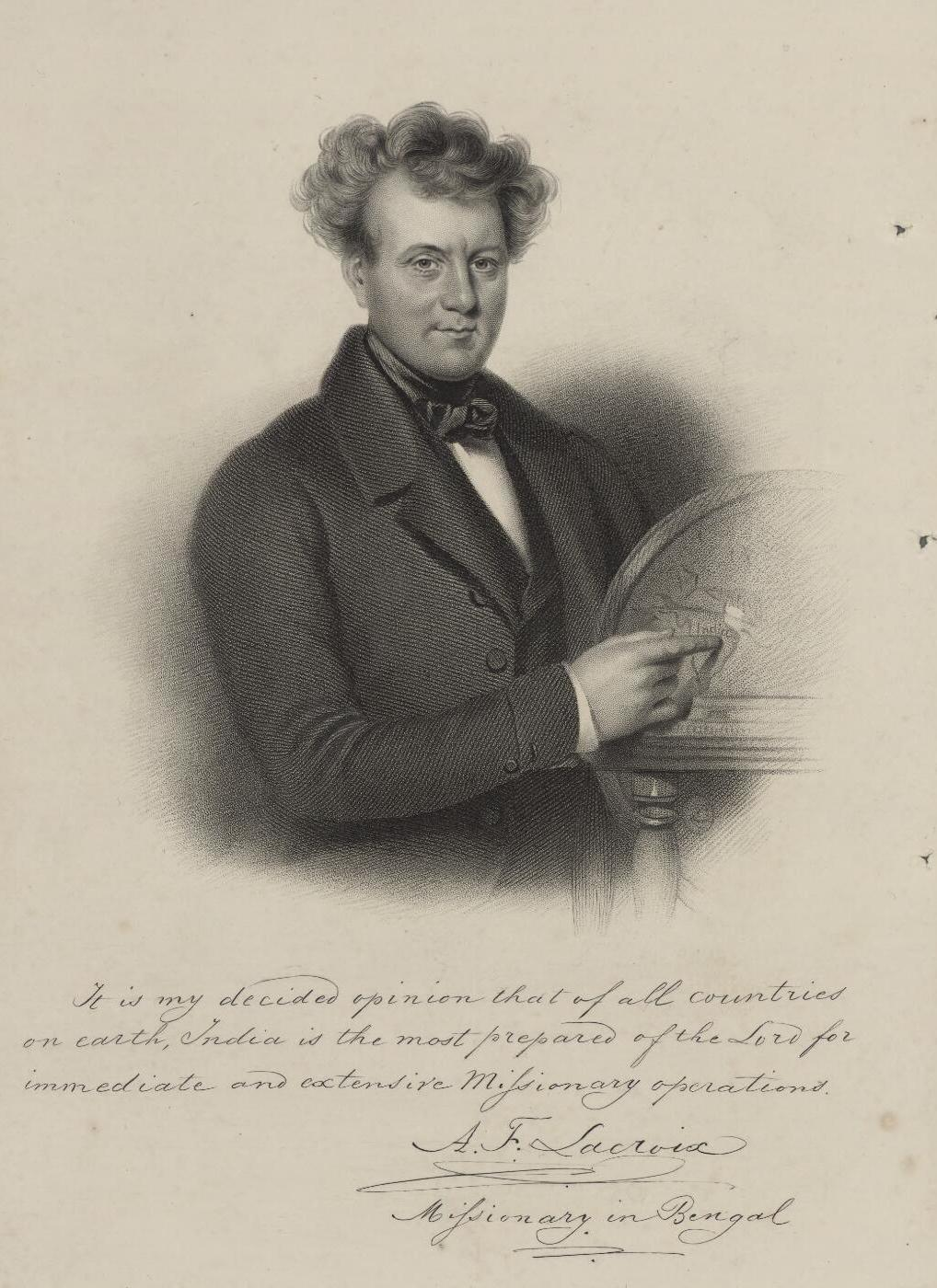
Portrait statement and signature of Alphonse François Lacroix

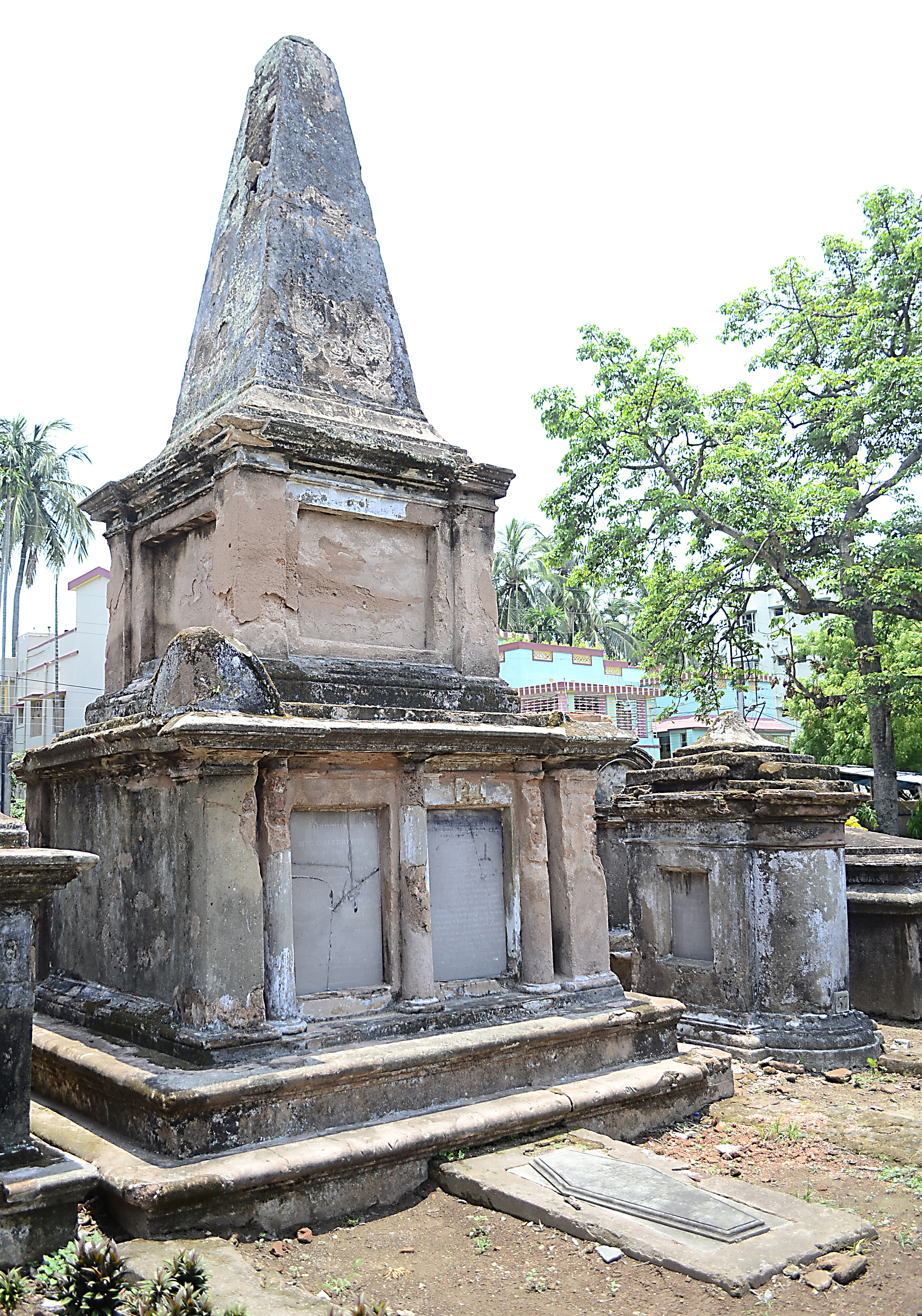
The tomb of Catharina Carolina Herklots & Gregorius Herklots and the grave of Alphonse Herklots Lacroix, Dutch Cemetery, Chinsurah

== Life ==
Lacroix was born in the Principality of Neuchâtel on 10 May 1799. He was educated there under the care of his uncle, named Chanel, until he was 17 years of age.

In 1816 Lacroix went to Amsterdam as a tutor, and while there learned of the Christian conversion of Tahiti. He offered himself as a missionary. He was first appointed an agent of the Netherlands Missionary Society at Chinsurah, near Calcutta in British India, but on the cession of the settlement to the British East India Company he transferred his services to the London Missionary Society, and became a British subject.

Lacroix married at Chinsurah, and stayed there until 1827, when he moved to Calcutta. While there he set up a religious movement in the villages to the south and east of the city as well as in the district of the Sunderbunds. He also preached in Sagar Island, and made visits to the Ichamati River and Mathabhanga River. He devoted spare time to revising the scriptures in Bengali and to training local preachers.

During the 38 years that he was in South Asia, Lacroix paid just one visit to Europe. During 1842–3 he spent time in Switzerland, France, and England, publicising his mission work, particularly in Geneva. He pursued his pastorate in Calcutta until his death there on 8 July 1859. He was a natural preacher, spoke English well, but French and Bengali better.

== Family ==
Lacroix in 1825 married Hannah Herklots. Their children included Hana Catherine, who married the missionary Joseph Mullens. She grew up fluent in Bengali and did notable work in the zenana missions to women living in seclusion.
