= Thomas Harrison Burder =

Thomas Harrison Burder (1789–1843) was an English medical doctor and writer.

== Life ==
Thomas Harrison Burder was born in 1789 at Coventry in England, where his father George Burder was a Congregationalist minister. His elder brother, Henry Forster Burder was born in 1783, and also became a minister. T H Burder originally wanted to become a chemist, but after a while he decided to pursue the medical profession. Burder went to the University of Edinburgh in 1812, and took the degree of M.D. in 1815. While in Edinburgh Burder was elected president of the Royal Medical Society.

He suffered from poor health. He settled in London as a physician, and was for a time attached to the Westminster General Dispensary; he had to take respites from medical work. He had married his cousin, Elizabeth Burder, in 1828, and his father George had passed the last four years of his life under their roof. After his death in 1832, Burder began to think seriously of leaving London, and this plan he carried out in 1834. He died at Tunbridge Wells in 1843 at the age of 54. He left no family, and his widow died in the following year.

== Work ==
He was a contributor to the Cyclopædia of Practical Medicine (1833–5), and the materials for one of his articles (‘Headache’) were drawn from his own experience. Burder is also noted for a series of letters, combined into a work entitled Burder's Letters from a Senior to a Junior Physician: on the Importance of Promoting the Religious Welfare of his Patients. After he had retired from his practice, a suggestion from James Hope induced him to author the letters, which eventually appeared in the Evangelical Magazine for 1836. Composed at Tilford in Surrey, they were popular reading material among 19th century British medical students and physicians. The letters are didactic, with the listener from the opening dedication addressed as an anonymous "Dear Friend."

== See also ==
- List of people from Tunbridge Wells
