= Daniel Fisher (minister) =

English dissenting minister

Rev. Daniel Fisher
- Born: 1731; Cockermouth, Cumberland, England
- Died: 14 August 1807 (aged 69–70); Hackney, London
- Occupation: Congregational minister

Daniel Fisher (1731–1807) was an English dissenting minister.

Fisher was born in Cockermouth, Cumberland in 1731. From 1748 to 1751, he attended Plaisterers' Hall Academy in London, which was a dissenting academy that provided for the training of Congregational ministers in the Calvinist tradition.

In 1752 accepted an invitation to minister to the Independent congregation at Common Close in Warminster, Wiltshire. While in Warminster, he ran a school.

In 1771 he was appointed the resident tutor in classics and mathematics at Homerton College. Following the death of John Conder in 1781 he was appointed theology tutor, from 1781 to 1803. He was a rigid Calvinist and staunch dissenter. His students included Ezekiel Blomfield.

He died at Hackney on 14 August 1807 after a lingering illness, in which he lost the use of all his faculties. Two funeral sermons were preached on the occasion, one of which, by the Rev. Samuel Palmer, was published under the title of The General Union of Believers (1807). Fisher was buried at Bunhill Fields burial ground.
