= Job Orton =

English dissenting minister (1717–1783)

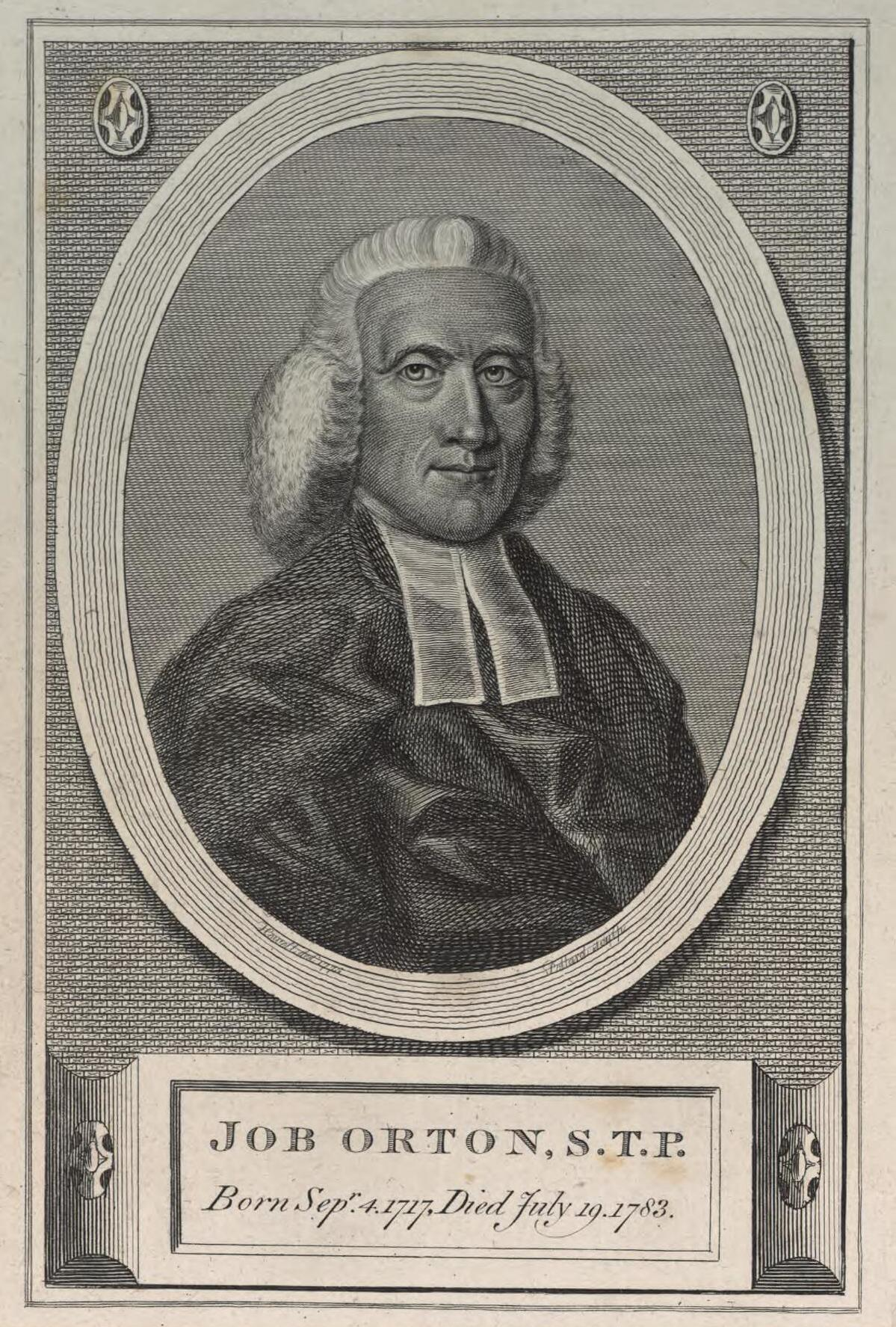
Job Orton

Job Orton (4 September 1717 – 1783) was an English dissenting minister.

== Life ==
He was born at Shrewsbury, Shropshire. He entered the academy of Dr Philip Doddridge at Northampton, became minister of a congregation formed by a fusion of Presbyterians and Independents at High Street Chapel, Shrewsbury (1741), received Presbyterian ordination there (1745), resigned in 1766 owing to ill-health, and lived in retirement at Kidderminster, Worcestershire, until his death. Between 1745 and 1747 he served as the first board secretary, as well as a trustee, of the Salop Infirmary in Shrewsbury. He was buried in Shrewsbury in the churchyard of old St Chad's Church.

== Work ==
He exerted great influence both among dissenting ministers and among clergy of the established church. He was deeply read in Puritan divinity, and adopted Sabellian doctrines on the Trinity. Old-fashioned in most of his views, he disliked the tendencies alike of the Methodists and other revivalists and of the rationalizing dissenters, yet he had a good word for Joseph Priestley and Theophilus Lindsey.

== Writings ==
Among his numerous works which include sermons, discourses and essays are Memoirs of Doddridge (published 1766), Letters to Dissenting Ministers (ed by S. Palmer, 2 vols., 1806), and Practical Works (2 vols., with letters and memoir, 1842). He was also involved in editing the unpublished works of Philip Doddridge after he died in 1751. He was encouraged in this work by his widow, Mercy Doddridge.

== Theology ==
In an 1887 publication of the Sword and the Trowel (the magazine of Charles Spurgeon), a columnist accused Orton of Socinianism: "The Rev. Job Orton, one of Dr. Doddridge’s students, and for a short time an assistant tutor with him at Northampton, was the minister of the united congregation of Presbyterians and Independents, meeting at High Street, Shrewsbury, from 1741 to 1765. He was not considered fully orthodox, though many of his sentiments were sound and good. Many of his hearers suspected him of heresy concerning the Godhead of Christ, and when, in preaching those expositions of the Bible, which were afterwards published in six volumes, he came to Isaiah 9:6, “Unto us a son is born,” […] and they were listening with breathless attention as to what he would say on that part, “The mighty God,” they were sadly disappointed when he passed the glorious declaration over by saying, “The mighty God. The meaning of this I cannot tell; and how should I, when his name is called Wonderful?” It need be no matter of surprise that his successor at High Street was a Socinian, and that the orthodox part of his congregation founded the Independent church at Swan Hill, which retains, in all essential things, its primitive soundness.”
