= Ezekiel Blomfield =

- Born: 28 October 1778; North Walsham, Norfolk, England
- Died: 14 July 1818 (aged 39); Great Glemham, Suffolk
- Occupation: Congregational minister
- Known for: Publishing religious works and works on natural history
- Spouse: Mary Anne (née Funnell)

Ezekiel Blomfield (1778–1818) was a Congregational minister, author and compiler of religious works and works on natural history. His parents were Stephen Blomfield (born c.1740, died 27 November 1809) and Elizabeth Blomfield (née Luiss (Lewis), born c.1750, died 17 March 1799). Ezekiel was the youngest of four children. He was born on 28 October 1778 at North Walsham, Norfolk then moved with his parents to Norwich. He died on 14 July 1818 at Great Glemham, Suffolk and was buried on 21 July 1818 in the grounds of the Meeting House at Wortwell, Norfolk.

== Education ==
While his parents were poor Ezekiel showed determination for acquiring knowledge and by the age of 10 he was collecting information for a ‘Table of Chronological Events' and a ‘System of Natural History.’ His interest in the phenomena of nature was influenced by reading Evenings at Home, which was a popular series of books by John Aikin and his sister Anna Laetitia Barbauld, which considered the principles of "botany, zoology, numbers, change of state in chemistry ... the money system, the calendar, geography, meteorology, agriculture, political economy, geology, [and] astronomy".

At the age of 15 Ezekiel developed strong religious convictions. He was placed under the care of the Rev. Samuel Newton, a non-conformist minister at Norwich, (asst. 1757–1768; pastor 1768–1810), who taught Ezekiel Latin, Greek, and Hebrew. In 1796 Ezekiel decided to become to be a minister of the gospel and was accepted at the non-conformist Homerton Academy, where he studied under the supervision of Dr. Daniel Fisher.

== Ministry ==
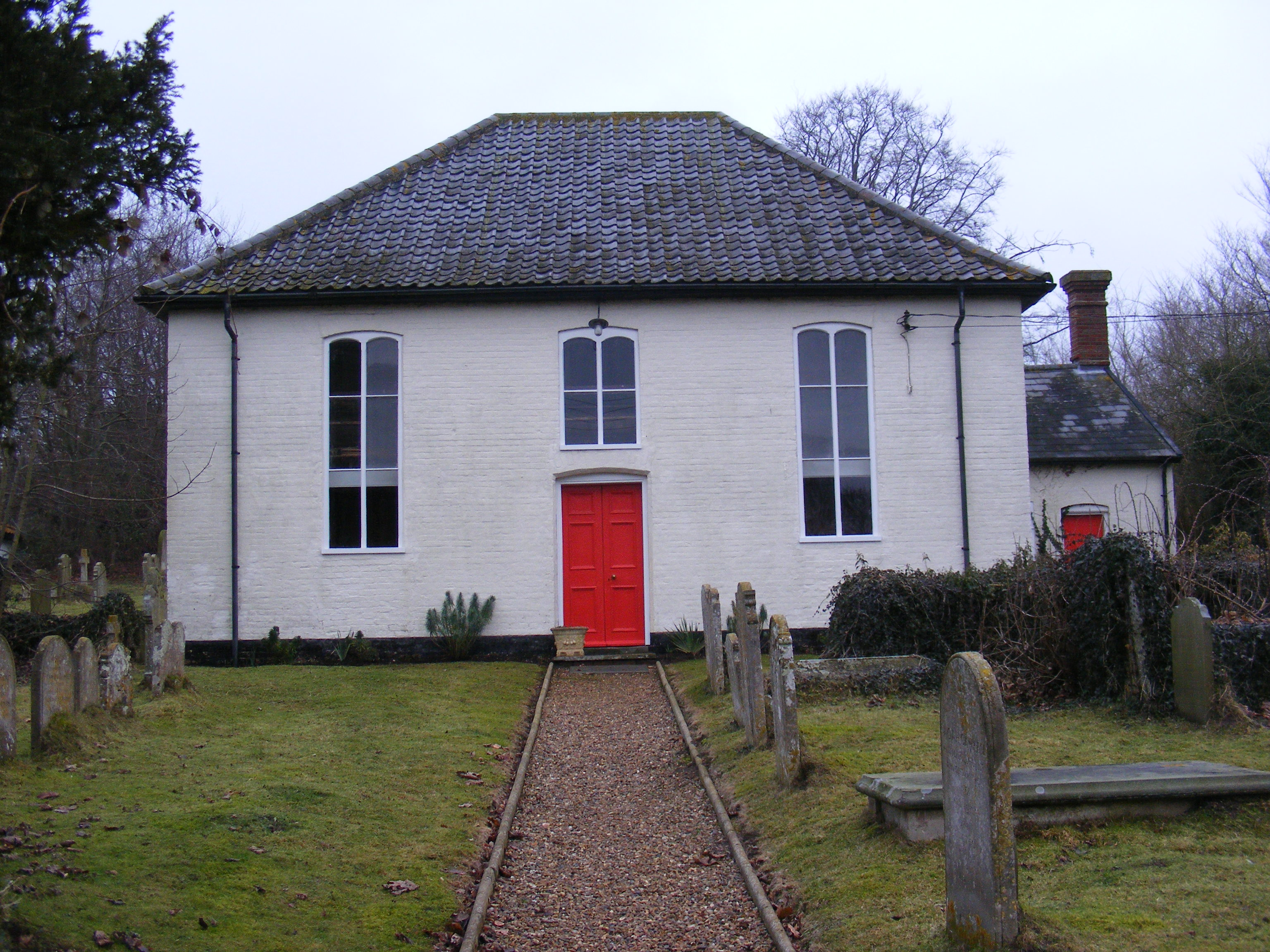
Meeting House, Wortwell

After four years training at Homerton Academy Ezekiel accepted a congregation at Wymondham in Norfolk where he preached and established Sunday schools and missionary societies. He wrote works commissioned by Charles Brightley, a printer of Bungay, Suffolk. Charles Brightly had established a printing and stereotype foundry in 1795, which in partnership with John Filby Childs, became Brightly & Childs in 1808 and later Messrs. Childs and Son.

His sister Elizabeth Blomfield (1773–1852) was a member of the Wymondham congregation.

In 1809 Ezekiel moved to Wortwell in Norfolk and ministered to the combined Harleston and Wortwell Congregational Churches. He died on 14 July 1818 and was buried on 21 July 1818 in the grounds of the Meeting House at Wortwell.

== Family ==
On 20 October 1800 he married Mary Anne Funnell of Hunworth, Norfolk. They had 9 children, with one daughter dying within 6 months of birth:

- Mary Ann Blomfield - born 21 July 1801 in Wymondham, Norfolk, England
- Martha Elizabeth Blomfield - born 11 December 1802 in Wymondham
- Ezekiel Richard Blomfield - born 29 July 1804 in Wymondham
- Rebecca Alice Blomfield - born 24 June 1806 in Wymondham
- Joanna Sarah Blomfield - born 30 June 1808 in Wymondham
- Stephen Edward Blomfield - born 22 September 1810 in Wortwell
- Selina Dorcas Blomfield - born 20 August 1812 in Wortwell; died 13 February 1813
- Selina Dorcas Blomfield - born 2 April 1815 in Wortwell
- Deborah Hannah Blomfield - born 11 February 1817 in Wortwell

Ezekiel died 14 July 1818, leaving a widow and young family without an income. Charles Brightley assisted Mary Blomfield by arranging the publishing of Ezekiel's 'Philosophy of History', which was published in a fine quarto in 1819, with a memoir. These works are described as being “somewhat fragmentary and commonplace” and did not generate much income.

Five of the daughters eventually migrated to New Zealand, another spent time in Tahiti; with four marrying missionaries:

- Mary Ann Blomfield (married Samuel Goddard Ludbrook, who died in 1841) and that same year Mary Ann and her son Samuel Blomfield Ludbrook migrated to New Zealand to join her sister Martha. Samuel married Caroline Williams, a daughter of The Rev. Henry Williams who was the leader of the Church Missionary Society (CMS) in New Zealand, an evangelistic organisation working within the Anglican Communion.
- Martha Elizabeth Blomfield married the Rev. George Clarke in England and migrated to New Zealand as CMS missionaries.
- Joanna Sarah Blomfield and Rebecca Alice Blomfield also migrated to New Zealand, where Joanna married the Rev. Richard Matthews, also a CMS missionary.
- Selina Dorcas Blomfield married the Rev. Dr. Alexander MacDonald, a member of the London Missionary Society (LMS), a Congregational missionary society. The Rev. Dr. Alexander and Selina MacDonald arrived in Rarotonga in May 1836, then Samoa in April 1837 and settled at Safune on the central north coast of Savai'i island in Samoa in August 1837. As the result of ill health the Rev. Dr. Alexander MacDonald left the LMS in 1850 when he accepted a position with the Congregational church in Auckland, New Zealand.
- Deborah Hannah Blomfield married Charles Green Stevens, who was ordained a minister and as a member of the LMS. The Rev. Charles and Deborah Stevens left for Tahiti in 1837 returning to England in 1841 due to ill health.

== Published works ==
Ezekiel Blomfield published books on natural history and religious matters including:

- 'A General View of the World, Geographical, Historical, and Philosophical; on a Plan entirely new', by Ezekiel Blomfield, published in two huge quartos (Bungay, Suffolk: C. Brightly & E. Kinnersly, 1804 & 1807).
- ‘A New Family Bible containing the Old and New Testaments, with notes, illustrations and practical improvements; selected from the exposition of the Rev. Matthew Henry’, by Rev E Blomfield, 2 vols. Embellished with fifty engravings (Bungay: C. Brightly and T. Kinnersley, 1809).
- 'The History of the Martyrs; or an Authentic narration of the sufferings of the Church of Christ, in every part of the world, from the age of the Apostles to the present time, etc.', by Ezekiel Blomfield (Bungay: Brightly & Co., 1810)
- ‘The Life of Jesus Christ with a History of the First Propagation of the Christian Religion, and the Lives of the Most Eminent Persons Mentioned in the New Testament’, by Ezekiel Blomfield (Bungay: C. Brightly and T. Kinnersley, 1809), (Bungay: Brightly and Childs, 1813) and (Bungay: T. Kinnersley, 1813).
- 'The Impartial Expositor and Family Bible', by Ezekiel Blomfield (Bungay: Brightly & Childs, 1815, 1816).
- ‘Lectures on the philosophy of history, accompanied with notes and illustrative engravings’, by Ezekiel Blomfield (London: Black, Kingsbury, Parbury & Allen, 1819).
