= David Forde =

David Forde may refer to:

- David Forde (Clare hurler) (born 1976), Irish sportsperson
- David Forde (footballer) (born 1979), professional Irish footballer
- David Forde (Galway hurler) (born 1981), Irish sportsperson

== See also ==
- David Ford (disambiguation)
