= Robert Sanders (writer) =

Scottish hack writer

- Born: 1727
- Died: 24 March 1783 (aged 55–56)
- Occupation: hack writer
- Writing career
- Pen name: Nathaniel Spencer

Robert Sanders (1727–1783), pseudonym Nathaniel Spencer, was a Scottish hack writer in London.

== Life ==
The son of Thomas Sanders, he was born at Breadalbane, Scotland, and was apprenticed to a comb-maker. He taught himself some Latin, Greek, and Hebrew, and taught in schools in the north of England.

About 1760 Sanders came to London, and took to hack writing. A begging letter of 1768 mentions a wife and five young children. He haunted the London coffee-houses: the New England, St. Paul's, and New Slaughter's.

Sanders was a self-created LL.D., who quarreled with booksellers and patrons. He died of a pulmonary disorder, on 24 March 1783.

== Works ==
Compilations by Sanders included:

- The Newgate Calendar, or Malefactor's Bloody Register (1764), which came out in numbers, and was republished in five volumes.
- Editorial work on the History of the Life of Henry II (1769 edition) by George Lyttelton, 1st Baron Lyttelton
- The Complete English Traveller, or a New Survey and Description of England and Wales, containing a full account of what is curious and entertaining in the several counties, the isles of Man, Jersey, and Guernsey … and a description of Scotland (1771, weekly part publication, reissued under the pseudonym of Nathaniel Spencer). This work largely relied on John Ray, Daniel Defoe, Thomas Pennant, and similar authors.,
- The Christian's Divine Library, illustrated with Notes, (two volume 1774, reissue after part publication; known as Southwell's Bible, appearing as it did as by Henry Southwell, LL.D., rector of Asterby, Lincolnshire, who lent his name for a fee.
- The Lucubrations of Gaffer Graybeard, containing many curious particulars relating to the Manners of the People in England during the Present Age; including the Present State of Religion particularly among the Protestant Dissenters, (1774, 4 vols., anonymous). It satirised leading London nonconformist ministers, such as John Gill and Thomas Gibbons.

He left a chronological work unfinished.

== Notes ==
Attribution

This article incorporates text from a publication now in the public domain: Lee, Sidney, ed. (1897). "Sanders, Robert". Dictionary of National Biography. Vol. 50. London: Smith, Elder & Co.
