= William Manning (Unitarian) =

William Manning (1630/33–1711) was an English ejected minister and Unitarian writer.

== Life ==
He is tentatively identified (by John Venn in Alumni Cantabrigienses as well as Alexander Gordon in the Dictionary of National Biography) with William Manning (son of William Manning) who was born at Cockfield, Suffolk. This Manning was educated at Stowmarket and admitted as a sizar of Christ's College, Cambridge, on 25 October 1649, aged 16, with Henry More as his tutor. He was one of three brothers, all holding benefices till the Act of Uniformity 1662, and members, while beneficed, of congregational churches; John (died 1694), who entered Emmanuel College, Cambridge, in 1633, and graduated M.A. in 1641, was perpetual curate of Peasenhall, Suffolk; Samuel was perpetual curate of Walpole, Suffolk. William was perpetual curate of Middleton, Suffolk, and ejected for nonconformity by the Act of Uniformity 1662.

William Manning at that date settled at Peasenhall, and took out a licence under the indulgence of 1672 as a congregational teacher in his own house there; his brother John, who remained at Peasenhall after his ejection, took out a similar licence. According to Gordon Manning seems to be the only instance of a Congregational minister ejected by the Act of Uniformity 1662 who later adopted fully Anti-Trinitarian views. In 1686, he published a small volume of sermons, broad in spirit, but evangelical in doctrine. He was in the habit of preaching occasionally at Lowestoft, Suffolk, and this brought him into acquaintance with Thomas Emlyn, who in 1689 was chaplain at Rose Hall to Sir Robert Rich, a member of the presbyterian congregation at Lowestoft. Manning and Emlyn both read William Sherlock's Vindication of the Trinity (1690). Manning made up his mind in favour of Socinianism, and argued strongly for it in his correspondence with Emlyn, which began on Emlyn's removal to Dublin (1691), and lasted till Manning's death.

Manning then looked for converts with some success, carrying a large part of his Peasenhall congregation with him, but failing with John Hurrion, at that time a student for the ministry (1698) at Heveningham, near Walpole. His chief local opponent was Nathaniel Parkhurst, vicar of Yoxford, Suffolk.

He became very deaf, and gave up preaching (before 1704). He died on 13 February 1711, aged (as was said) 81, and was buried at Peasenhall on 15 February. He was married in 1652; his wife Priscilla died on 14 June 1710, aged 80.

== Works ==
He published: Catholick Religion … discovered in … some Discourses upon Acts x. 35, 36, &c., 1686.
