= John Hurrion =

John Hurrion (1675?–1731) was an English Independent minister.

== Life ==
From a Suffolk family, he trained for the ministry among the Independents. About 1696 he succeeded William Bedbank at Denton, Norfolk. There he engaged in a controversy on Christology with William Manning, a Socinian minister at Peasenhall, Suffolk.

He took on the parish of St Mary Denton in Norfolk in 1696 - which was in a poor state. He was known for not visiting his parishioners and spending his time studying. However he married whilst there and he was well respected by other ministers and his oratory brought the parish church into more popularity.

Hurrion moved to Hare Court Chapel in London in 1724, but suffered from poor health, and neglected his congregation. In 1726 he was chosen one of the Merchants' lecturers at Pinners' Hall. Hurrion was throughout his life, studious, reclusive and sedentary. He died on 31 December 1731 in London of dropsy.

== Works ==
Hurrion's published works included, with single sermons:

- The Knowledge of Christ and him Crucified … applied in eight Sermons, London, 1727.
- The Knowledge of Christ glorified, opened and applied in twelve Sermons, London, 1729.
- The Scripture Doctrine of the proper Divinity, real Personality, and the External and Extraordinary Works of the Holy Spirit … defended in sixteen Sermons, London, 1734.
- The Scripture Doctrine of Particular Redemption stated and vindicated in four Sermons, London, 1773.
- Sermons preached at the Merchants' Lectures, Pinners' Hall, London, Bristol, 1819.
- The whole Works of … John Hurrion, edited with memoir by Abraham Taylor, London, 1823, 3 vols.

== Family ==
Hurrion married about 1696 Jane, daughter of Samuel Baker of Wattisfield Hall, Suffolk. They had two sons who survived him; both entered the Independent ministry.

== Notes ==
Attribution

This article incorporates text from a publication now in the public domain: Lee, Sidney, ed. (1891). "Hurrion, John". Dictionary of National Biography. Vol. 28. London: Smith, Elder & Co.
