= King's Head Society =

The King's Head Society was an 18th-century organisation funding dissenting academies in England.

The King's Head Society was a group of laymen named after the pub behind the Royal Exchange at which they met. From 1730 they worked to promote Calvinism, by sponsoring young male scholars to attend dissenting academies. There nonconformists could learn the necessary "grammarian," or classical education, which was a pre-requisite for the four-year "academical" course of the Congregational Board. A classical education included the demanding and lengthy training period required for learning to read Greek and Latin texts in their original form.

A secret society and discussion club at Homerton College, Cambridge (a descendant institution of one set up by the King's Head Society) is named after the Society.

The King's Head Society Academies (1731–1769) included:

- Samuel Parsons's Academy, Clerkenwell Green (1731–35);
- Abraham Taylor's Academy, Deptford (1735–40);
- Stepney Academy (1740–44); (tutors: John Hubbard (1740–1743); Zephaniah Marryat (1743–1744); John Walker (1742–1744) Hubbard and Marryat were strict Calvinists;
- Plaisterer's Hall Academy (1744–54) (Tutors: Walker, Marryatt, John Conder & Thomas Gibbons);
- Mile End Academy (1754–69) (Tutors: Conder, Gibbons & Walker);
- The academy was set up after the Society purchased an estate at Homerton in 1768, with the students in residence by the end of 1769. The name of the institution changed over time; it became known as Homerton Academy and Independent College, Homerton.
