= David Everard Ford =

English Congregational minister (1797–1875)

David Everard Ford (1797–1875) was an English Congregational minister, religious author and hymn composer.

Ford was born on 13 September 1797 at Long Melford in Suffolk, where his father, the Rev. David Ford, was a Congregational minister. In 1816 he entered Wymondley College, and in 1821 became Congregational minister at Lymington in Hampshire.

== Hymns ==
During the twenty years of his residence in this town he published seven books of psalm and hymn tunes harmonised for four voices; a chorus for five voices—‘Blessings for ever on the Lamb’ (1825?); a song, ‘The Negro Slave’ (1825); ‘Progressive Exercises for the Voice, with illustrative examples’ (1826); ‘Observations on Psalmody’ (1828?); and in 1829 the ‘Rudiments of Music,’ the eleventh thousand of which was issued with the author's final revisions in 1843.

== Sermons ==
Besides these musical productions Ford also published a sermon on John xi. 36, in 1826, and in 1828 ‘Hymns chiefly on the Parables of Christ.’ But the work by which he is best known, and which produced a great and immediate effect upon the religious world of the time, was an essay entitled, ‘Decapolis; or the Individual Obligation of Christians to save Souls from Death.’ This was published in 1840, and within a year had reached its fifth thousand; a fifth American edition also being issued in New York in 1848. Other essays of a similar kind were entitled ‘Chorazin; or an Appeal to the Child of many Prayers,’ 1841; ‘Damascus; or Conversion in relation to the Grace of God and the Agency of Man,’ 1842; ‘Laodicea; or Religious Declension,’ 1844; and ‘Alarm in Zion; or a few Thoughts on the Present State of Religion,’ 1847.

In 1841 Ford accepted an appointment from the Congregational Union to visit the stations of the Home Missionary Society, and in 1843 took the oversight of a newly-formed church in Manchester. Here he remained till 1858, when he retired from stated service as a resident minister. He, however, still continued to preach to other congregations in various parts of the country till 1874, when cataract, beginning to affect his vision, compelled him to desist. He died at Bedford 23 October 1875 at the age of seventy-eight.
