= Thomas Gibbons (hymn writer) =

Dr. Thomas Gibbons (1720–1785) was a London nonconformist minister who wrote hymns, sermons, and poetry.

== Life ==
He was the son of Thomas Gibbons, at one time minister of a dissenting congregation at Olney in Buckinghamshire, and afterwards of a congregation at Royston in Hertfordshire. He was born at Reach, Cambridgeshire, on 31 May 1720, and went to local schools. At about 15 years of age he was sent to Abraham Taylor's dissenting academy in Deptford, and then to that of John Eames in Moorfields.

In 1742 Gibbons was appointed assistant to the Rev. Thomas Bures, minister of the Silver Street Presbyterian congregation, and in the next year he was chosen minister of the Independent congregation of Haberdashers' Hall. In 1754 he was elected one of the three tutors of the Mile End academy, where he gave instruction in logic, metaphysics, ethics, and rhetoric, till the end of his life. He was chosen Sunday evening lecturer in the Monkwell Street meeting-house in 1759. He received the degree of M.A. from New Jersey in 1760, and that of D.D. from Aberdeen in 1764. He was elected to the American Philosophical Society in 1775.

Gibbons died in the Hoxton Square coffee-house, 22 Feb. 1785. For a lack of poetical talent, Gibbons was satirised in An Epistle to the Rev. Mr. Tho. G-bb-ns on his Juvenilia (1750); and also by Robert Sanders in Gaffer Greybeard as "Dr. Hymnmaker". Samuel Johnson enjoyed his society.

== Works ==
Gibbons's writings included:

- Juvenilia; poems on various subjects of devotion and virtue, 1750.
- Rhetoric, 1767.
- Hymns adapted to Divine Worship, 1769.
- The Christian Minister, in three Poetic Epistles, 1772.
- Female Worthies, 2 vols. 1777.
- Memoirs of the Rev. Isaac Watts, D.D., 1780.
- Sermons on evangelical and practical subjects, 3 vols. 1787.

A favourite form of composition was elegies on the death of his friends and others. A list of between forty and fifty works by Gibbons was in the Protestant Dissenters' Magazine, ii. 492, 493, and in Walter Wilson's Dissenting Churches, iii. 181, 182.
