= Ashton Lodge =

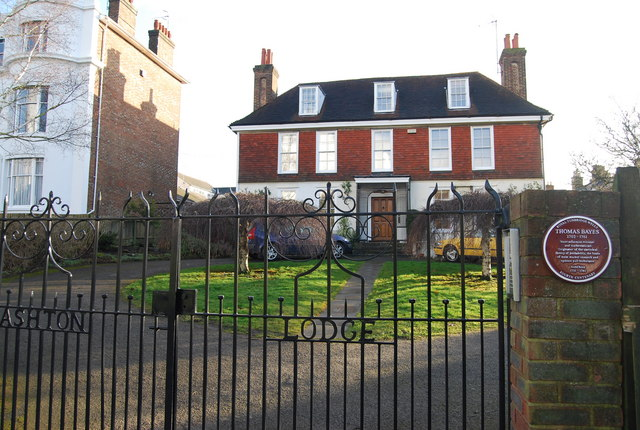
- Ashton Lodge, January 2009

- Location within Kent
- 51.13260°N 0.25979°E
- Type: House
- Location: Royal Tunbridge Wells, Kent

History
- Built: 18th century

Listed Building – Grade II
- Official name: Ashton Lodge, 69 London Road
- Designated: 20 May 1952
- Reference no.: 1338813

Ashton Lodge is a Grade II listed building in Royal Tunbridge Wells. It was formerly known as Jordan Lodge and appeared under that name in a 1738 map of the town by John Bowra, who named John Jeffrey as the owner.

Thomas Bayes lived in the house from 1734 to 1761.

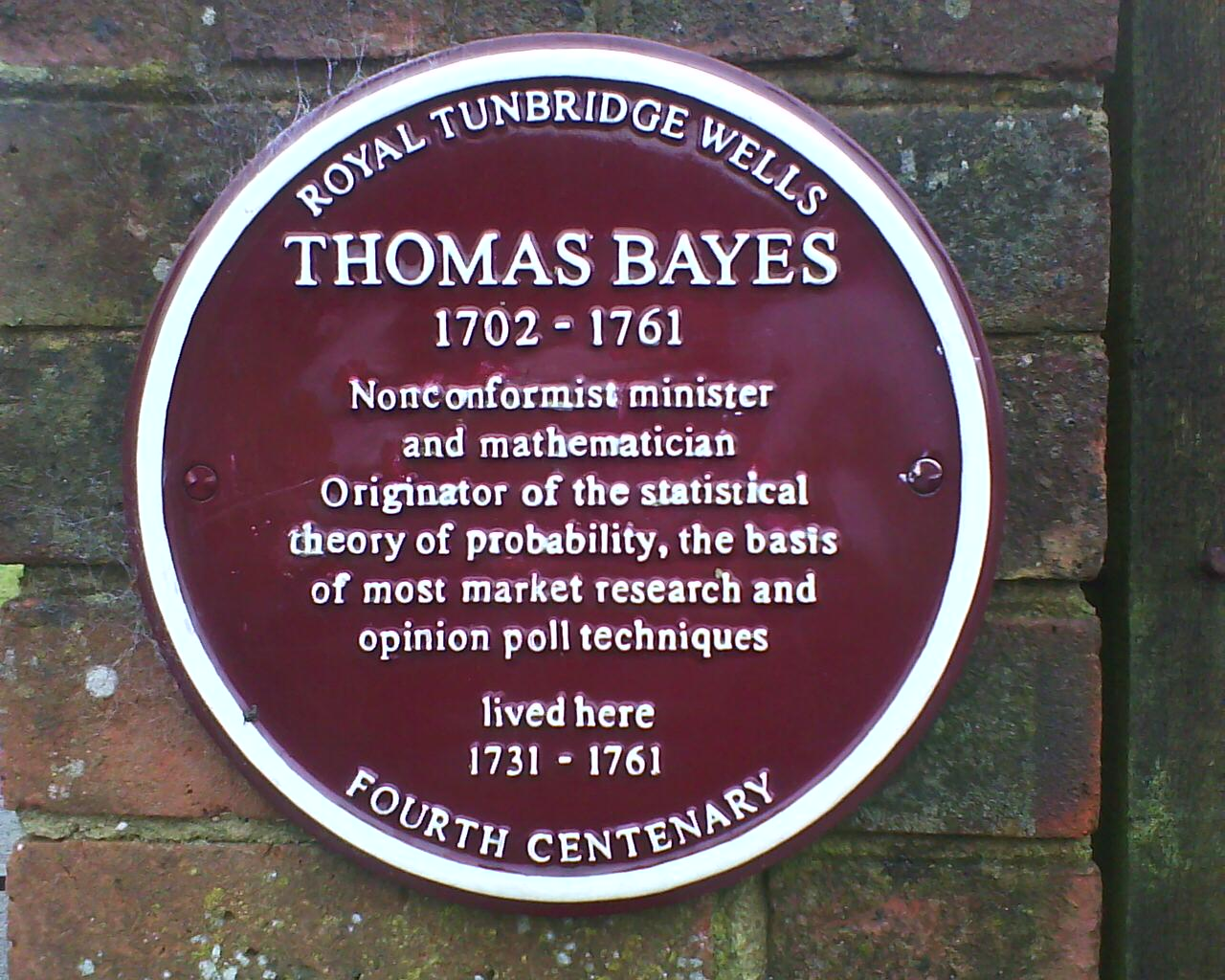
A closeup of the Thomas Bayes plaque on the gatepost.
