= Daventry Academy =

Former dissenting college

Daventry Academy was a dissenting academy, that is, a school or college set up by English Dissenters. It moved to many locations, but was most associated with Daventry, West Northamptonshire, where its most famous pupil was Joseph Priestley. It had a high reputation, and in time it was amalgamated into New College London.

== History ==
An academy was started in Kibworth around 1715, and moved at some point to Market Harborough, where Philip Doddridge was chosen as its principal. The academy moved to Northampton in 1729. Doddridge was frequently travelling and it was his wife Mercy Doddridge who looked after the school's finances. She corresponded with her husband but she sacked an employee on her own authority. The academy had at its largest seven employees to look after sixty-three students.

The academy attracted the support of the Coward Trust, funded through the philanthropy of William Coward (died 1738), a London merchant who used his money to train ministers for the "protestant dissenters". After the death of Doddridge in 1751, his wife tidied up his affairs and the trustees took over the academy. In 1752 the academy was moved to Daventry, back to Northampton, then to Wymondley, and finally in 1833 to London.

=== Northampton ===
While known as the Northampton Academy, several notable English Unitarian ministers were trained there, including Hugh Farmer and Lant Carpenter who studied there for a year in 1797, before the academy was closed by the trustees in 1798. When the school returned to Northampton in 1789, it was run by John Horsey with various assistant tutors. It had 38 or 39 students. The school, which was supposed to teach an Arian Christology, was probably closed due to growing Socinian influence in the Northampton Academy.

In the second quarter of the 18th century, it was "undoubtedly one of the best dissenting academies" according to Priestley's most recent biographers.

=== Subsequently ===
The academy later moved to Little Wymondley in Hertfordshire, in 1799, where it was known as Wymondley College. In 1833, it relocated again, this time to London, and was renamed Coward College. That proved to be the last incarnation as in 1850 it merged with Highbury College and Homerton College to form New College London.

== Principals and alumni ==
Two of its principals were the Rev. Thomas Morell and Dr. Thomas William Jenkyn. Caleb Ashworth (died 1775) and Samuel Clark (died 1769) took over after Doddridge died in 1751.

Joseph Priestley studied theology there in the 1750s. Because he had already read widely, Priestley was allowed to skip the first two years of coursework. He continued his intense study; this, together with the liberal atmosphere of the school, shifted his theology further leftward and he became a Rational Dissenter. Abhorring dogma and religious mysticism, Rational Dissenters emphasized the rational analysis of the natural world and the Bible.
