= James Lomax Bardsley =

English physician (1801–1876)

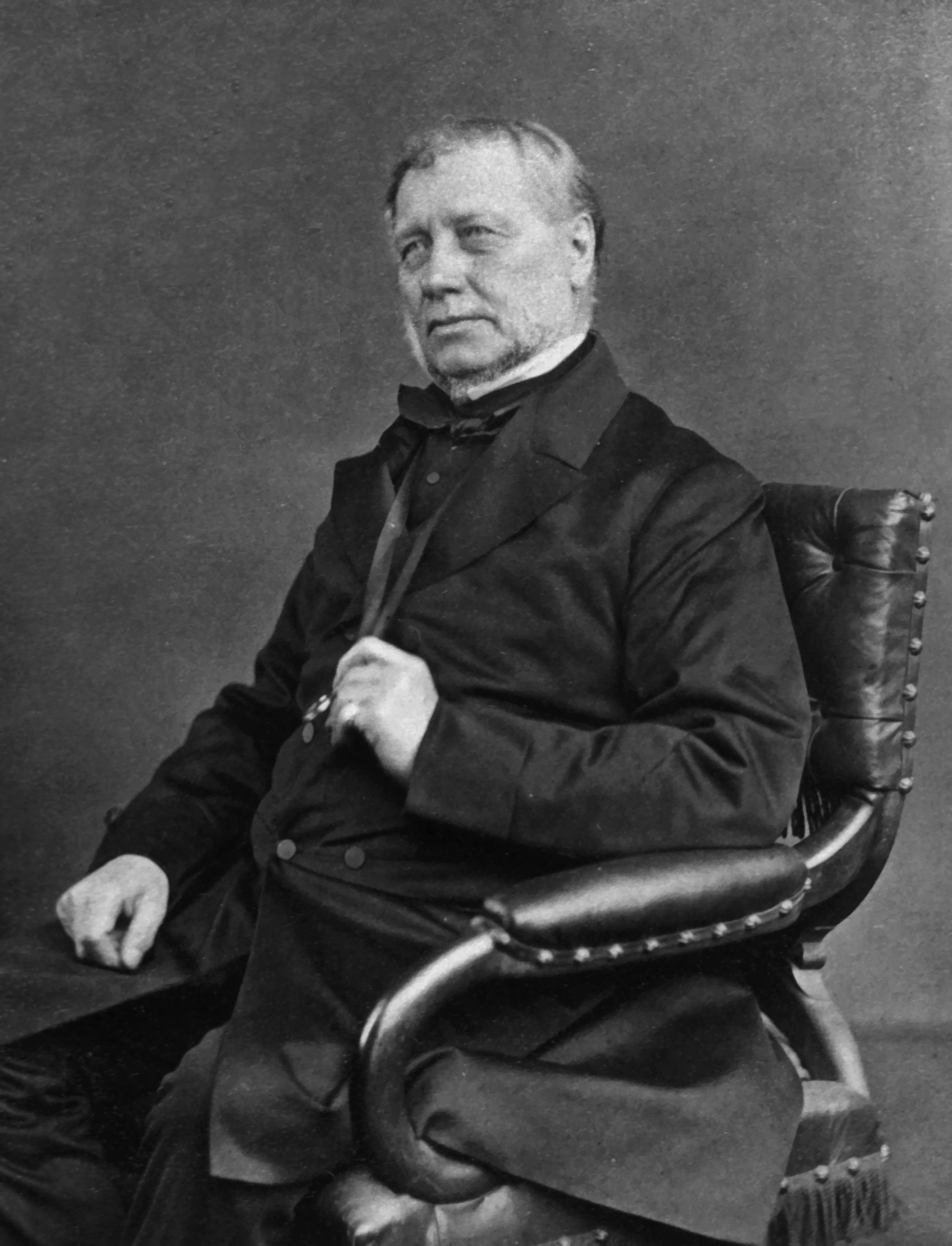
James Lomax Bardsley

Sir James Lomax Bardsley, M.D. (7 July 1801 – 10 July 1876) was an English physician.

== Life ==
Bardsley was born at Nottingham on 7 July 1801. His professional education was first under the direction of his uncle, Dr. Samuel Argent Bardsley, and subsequently at Glasgow and Edinburgh universities; he received the diploma of M.D. in 1823 at Edinburgh, and while a student there was elected president of the Royal Medical Society.

In 1823 Bardsley settled in Manchester, and was appointed one of the physicians of the Manchester Infirmary, a post which he held until 1843. He was associated with Thomas Turner in the management of the Manchester Royal School of Medicine and Surgery, and took an active part in the early proceedings of the British Medical Association.

In 1834 he became president of the Manchester Medical Society, and in 1850 a similar position in the Manchester Medico-Ethical Association was given to him. He was knighted as a distinguished provincial physician in August 1853. He died at Manchester 10 July 1876. He is buried in the graveyard of the now demolished church of St. Saviour at the junction of Upper Brook Street and Plymouth Grove, Chorlton-on-Medlock, Manchester.

== Diabetes ==
Bardsley authored the entry "Essay on Diabetes" for the Cyclopaedia of Practical Medicine which recognized diabetes Types 1 and 2. Bardsley put his diabetic patients on a low-carbohydrate diet of only animal food, with all sugar excluded but later added vegetables to the diet.

== Works ==
Bardsley published a volume of Hospital Facts and Observations in 1830, wrote the articles on diabetes and hydrophobia in the Cyclopædia of Practical Medicine (1833), and made other contributions to medical science, including the retrospective address in medicine at the annual meeting of the British Medical Association in 1837.

- Hospital Facts and Observations (1830)
