= Mercy Doddridge =

- Born: 4 September 1709; Worcester
- Died: 4 April 1790 (aged 80); Tewkesbury

Mercy Doddridge born Mercy Maris (4 September 1709 – 4 April 1790) was a British dissenting laywoman and letter-writer.

== Life ==
Doddridge was born in Worcester in 1709. She was the daughter of Richard Maris, a baker and maltster in the city, and his second wife, Elizabeth Brindley, who also had three sons and both came from middle-class dissenting families. In 1730 she was sent to stay with Mary and Ebenezer Hankins in Upton-upon-Severn in Worcestershire (this move is thought to be because her brother George was mentally unstable.)

Her husband to be, Philip Doddridge (1702–1751), was the principal of Daventry Academy, founded in 1715, which he relocated from Market Harborough to Northampton in 1729. In 1730 she was living with her aunt in Coventry when she met him and, after he had asked her aunt, he courted her. The courtship lasted for seven months, during which time she would have weekly letters. After the wedding in 1730 she moved into his house at 34 Marefair, Northampton, and he received a £400 dowry. Her husband's income at the time was £120 per year.

Doddridge was frequently travelling and it was Mercy who looked after the school's finances. She corresponded with her husband but she sacked an employee on her own authority. The academy had at its largest seven employees to look after sixty-three students.

== Marriage ==
On 22 December 1730 she married Philip Doddridge at Upton-upon-Severn and had nine children. The eldest, Elizabeth or Tetsey (1731–1736), died just before her fifth birthday and was buried under the platform of the Doddridge Chapel in Northampton. Of the remaining eight, four survived to adulthood: Mary, also known as Polly (1733–1799), who married John Humphreys; Mercy (1734–1809); Philip (1735–1785); and Anna Cecilia, also known as Caelia (1737–1811).

The correspondence between Mercy and Philip Doddridge provides an insight into their lives.

== Death and legacy ==
Doddridge died in 1790 in Tewkesbury. One of her and her daughter Mary's letters is in the City of London archives.
