= Wortwell =

Village in Norfolk, England

Coordinates: 52.41382°N 1.34525°E

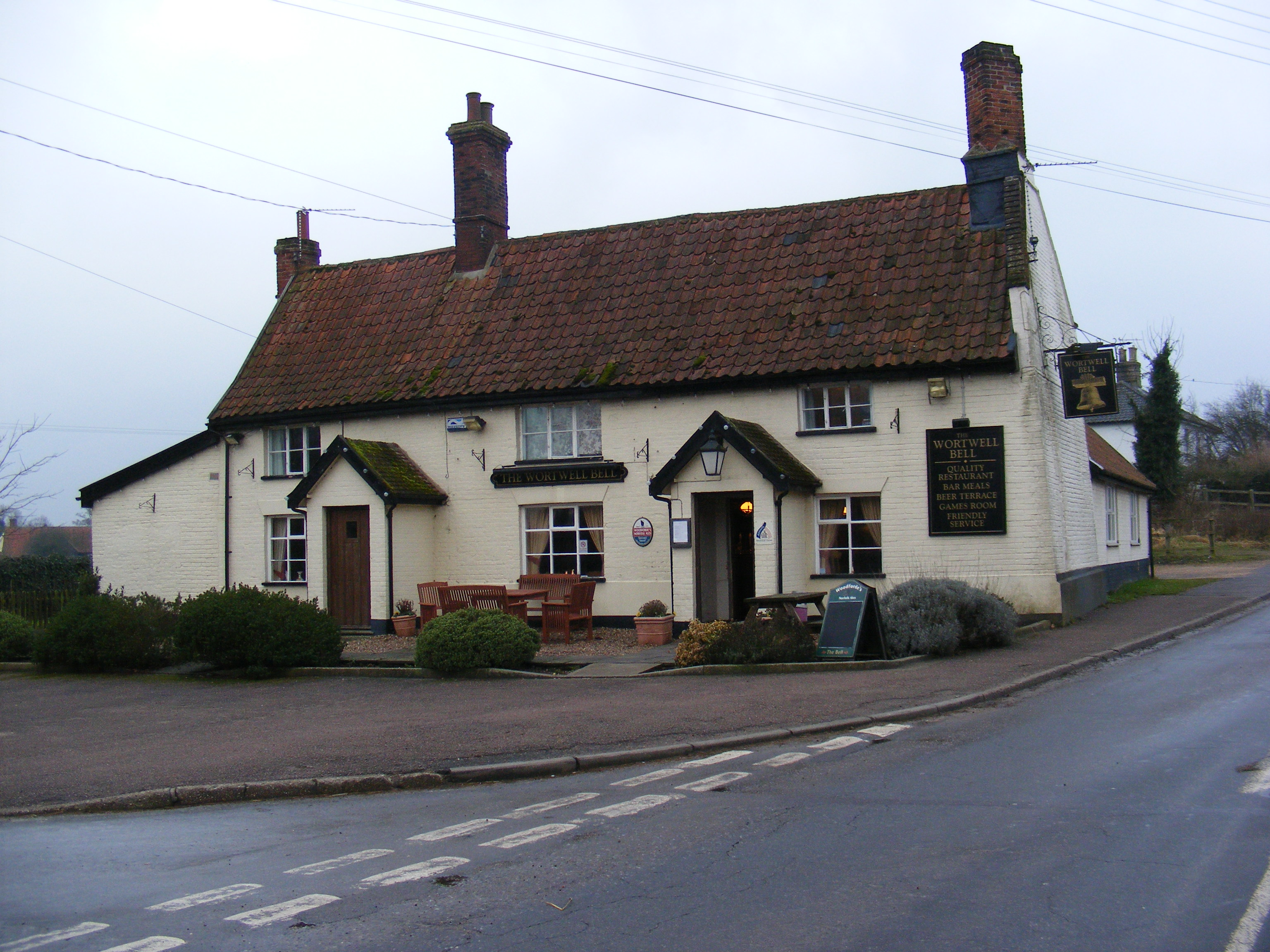
- Wortwell Village Pub

- Location within Norfolk
- Area: 4.6 km^{2} (1.8 sq mi)
- Population: 561 (2011)
  - Density: 122/km^{2} (320/sq mi)
- OS grid reference: TM276848
- Civil parish: Wortwell
- District: South Norfolk
- Shire county: Norfolk
- Region: East
- Country: England
- Sovereign state: United Kingdom
- Post town: HARLESTON
- Postcode district: IP20
- Dialling code: 01986
- Police: Norfolk
- Fire: Norfolk
- Ambulance: East of England

Wortwell is a village and civil parish in the English county of Norfolk and adjoining the county of Suffolk. It is located on both the River Waveney (which forms the county boundary) and the A143 road, some 10 miles (16 km) east of Diss and 18 miles (29 km) west of Lowestoft. The city of Norwich lies approximately 15 miles (24 km) to the north.

== Correct pronunciation ==
"Wottel"

== History and Geography ==
The village name originates from roughly 1704 when naturally occurring 'Wort' was found to spring from a well fed by a water source near the local river Waveney. When the local brewer was satisfied with the beer brewed from the 'Wortwell', he would ring a bell to let the local residents know it was ready for drinking, which also gave the local drinking establishment its name, established as a pub in 1836.

The civil parish has an area of 1.8 sq mi (4.6 km^{2}) and in the 2001 census had a population of 574 in 243 households, the population decreasing to 561 at the 2011 census. For the purposes of local government, the parish falls within the district of South Norfolk.

The village of Wortwell is one of the few in Norfolk not to be listed in the Domesday Book of 1086. Until the end of the 19th century, Wortwell was a hamlet within the parish of Mendham-in-Norfolk (the modern village of Mendham is south of the River Waveney in Suffolk), becoming a parish in the 1885 boundary alterations.

Ezekiel Blomfield (1778–1818), a Congregational minister, author and compiler of religious works and works on natural history, was buried on 21 July 1818 in the grounds of the Meeting House at Wortwell.

Wortwell has a well-established football club, and its two football teams currently compete in the Anglian Combination Football League, with the first team playing in Division 2 and the reserves playing in Division 6. Home games are played at the rec at Wortwell community centre village hall. The large community village hall, known as "The Core", is run as a charity to benefit the local area. It is home to a number of clubs and classes, and they hold regular events, including quiz and bingo nights.
