= Harry William Carter =

English physician

- Born: 7 September 1787; Canterbury
- Died: 16 July 1863 (aged 75)
- Occupation: Physician

Harry William Carter (7 September 1787 – 16 July 1863) was an English physician.

== Biography ==
Carter was born at Canterbury on 7 September 1787, being the son of William Carter, M.D., formerly fellow of Oriel College, Oxford. After education at the King's School, Canterbury, he went to Oriel College, Oxford, where he graduated B.A. 1807, M.A. 1810, M.B. 1811. In 1812 he was elected a Radcliffe travelling fellow, and spent several years afterwards on the continent. He became fellow of the London College of Physicians in 1825. He settled at Canterbury, was appointed physician to the Kent and Canterbury Hospital in 1819, and retired from practice in 1835, after this date residing at Kennington Hall, near Ashford, where he died on 16 July 1863.

In 1821 Carter published ‘A Short Account of some of the Principal Hospitals of France, Italy, Switzerland, and the Netherlands, with remarks on the Climate and Diseases of these Countries.’ He also contributed some essays to the ‘Cyclopædia of Practical Medicine.’
