= Hugh Farmer =

English Dissenter and theologian

Hugh Farmer (20 January 1714, – 5 February 1787) was an English Dissenter and theologian.

He was educated at the Dissenting Academy in Northampton under Philip Doddridge, and became pastor of a congregation at Walthamstow, Essex. In 1701 he became preacher and one of the Tuesday lecturers at Salters' Hall, London. He was a believer in miracles, but wrote against the existence of supernatural evil. He viewed the devil as allegorical.

== Life ==
A younger son of William and Mary Farmer, he was born on 20 January 1714 at the Isle Gate farm in a Shropshire hamlet called the Isle, within the parish of St. Chad, Shrewsbury. His mother was a daughter of Hugh Owen of Bronycludwr, Merionethshire, one of the nonconformists of 1662. Farmer was at school at Llanegryn, Merionethshire, and then under Charles Owen, at Warrington. In 1731 he entered the dissenting academy run by Philip Doddridge at Northampton; to his tutor's preaching and his reading of the sermons of Joseph Boyse he attributed his religious impressions. On leaving the academy (1736) he became assistant to David Some of Market Harborough (d. May 1737).

Early in 1737 he took charge of a struggling congregation at Walthamstow, founded by Samuel Slater, a minister ejected from St. James's, Bury St Edmunds. He at first lodged in London, only five miles away, but was then received into the family of William Snell, a chancery solicitor, and friend of Doddridge. Farmer made an increase in the congregation. In July, Doddridge, who had been asked to find a minister for the independent congregation at Taunton, applied to Farmer, who declined the overture; he explained that he was not Calvinistic enough for Taunton, the liberal element in the congregation having seceded with Thomas Amory. At Walthamstow was William Coward (died 1738), a benefactor to dissenting causes.

In 1740 a new meeting-house was built for Farmer on a piece of ground given by Snell. Farmer's preaching drew a distinguished congregation; Andrew Kippis remembered dozens of coaches in at the meeting-house door. He continued to reside with the Snells as a permanent guest, and spent most of his income in books. In 1759 his congregation relieved him of some duties by appointing as afternoon preacher Ebenezer Radcliffe, who remained his colleague till 1777. Thomas Belsham was invited to succeed him, but declined.

Farmer then prepared his treatise on Temptation of Christ (preface dated 23 June 1761). Soon afterwards he accepted the post of afternoon preacher at Salters' Hall, vacated by the promotion of Francis Spilsbury to the pastorate; this was a presbyterian congregation, but Farmer never ceased to be an independent. Except for that of James Fordyce of Monkwell Street, his was the largest afternoon congregation among the presbyterians of London. In 1762 he was elected a trustee of Dr. Williams's foundations; he was also elected a trustee of the Coward Trust. About the same time he was chosen one of the preachers at the "merchants' lecture" on Tuesday mornings at Salters' Hall.

Farmer resigned his Sunday lectureship at Salters' Hall in 1772; he delivered the charge at the ordination of Thomas Tayler at Carter Lane in 1778, but declined to print it; he resigned the merchants' lectureship in 1780. At the same time he resigned the pastorate at Walthamstow, but continued to preach in the morning until a successor was appointed. In 1782 he resigned his place on the Coward Trust, but was re-elected later.

His health was then failing, and he usually wintered at Bath. He overcame two severe attacks of kidney stone, but in 1785 was threatened with blindness (his father had been blind for six years before his death). An operation restored to him the use of his eyes, and his last days were devoted to study. He died on 5 February 1787, and was buried in the parish churchyard at Walthamstow, in the same grave with his friend Snell.

He never married. His elder brother, John, a strict Calvinist and a good scholar, became (30 December 1730) assistant to Richard Rawlin at Fetter Lane, and afterwards (28 March 1739) colleague with Edward Bentley at Coggeshall, Essex; he published a volume of sermons (1756), and succeeded Joseph Priestley at Needham Market, Suffolk (1758). He became deranged; Hugh, with whom he was not on good terms, then covertly provided for his wants.

== Views ==
"Never raise a difficulty without being able to solve it" was his frequent advice to young preachers. He censured Joseph Priestley's publications. Conservative in his views, he was keenly alive to the thorny places of doctrinal systems, and avoided them. His recommendation was "Sell all your commentators and buy Grotius", an echo of a remark which he had heard in Doddridge's classroom, but without Doddridge's qualification.

He exercised an influence on liberal dissent. He was the champion of the divine sovereignty, both as excluding from the physical world the operation of any other invisible agents, and as authorising the production of 'new phænomena' which remove 'the inconveniences of governing by fixed and general laws.' Farmer maintained that the proof of the divinity of a doctrine is the fact that its enunciation has been followed by a miracle. Farmer's positions were adopted by the rationalising section of dissenters; but in the long run his strong assertions of the fixity of natural law overcame his argument for miracles.

The subject proposed the wilderness account of Christ's temptation by the Devil was a prophetic vision, rather than an actual event.

== Works ==
Farmer published:

- The Duty of Thanksgiving, &c. 1746, (a sermon, 9 October, on the battle of Culloden).
- Inquiry into the Nature and Design of our Lord's Temptation in the Wilderness (1761). This went through three editions in Farmer's lifetime; the fourth (1805) was edited by Jeremiah Joyce; a fifth appeared in 1822. John Mason of Cheshunt (Note: According to his biographer "...[from] Dorking, Surrey[, John Mason moved], ... in July 1746 ... as minister ... of a congregation at ... Cheshunt") claimed Farmer's theory as his own, but Farmer showed (in his 1764, second, edition) a radical distinction between them.
- Dissertation on the Miracles (1771); 2nd edit. 1804, edited by Joyce; 3rd edit. 1810. A German translation appeared at Berlin, 1777.
- An Examination of the late Mr. Le Moine's Treatise on Miracles, 1772 (occasioned by a series of attacks in the London Magazine, charging him with plagiarising from Abraham Le Moine).
- Essay on the Demoniacs of the New Testament (1775); 2nd edit. 1779; 3rd edit. 1805, edited by Joyce, with the Inquiry; 4th edit. (called the third), 1818. A German translation appeared at Berlin, 1776.
- Letters to the Rev. Dr. Worthington, &c., 1778 (reply to 'An Impartial Inquiry into the case of the Gospel Demoniacs,’ 1777, by Richard Worthington, M.D.).
- The General Prevalence of the Worship of Human Spirits in the ancient Heathen Nations (1783).

Posthumously (with the 'Memoirs,’ 1804) were printed:

- 'A Reply' to John Fell, on the General Prevalence; and
- nine extracts from 'An Essay on the Case of Balaam,’ from a transcript made by Michael Dodson.

Farmer's will instructed his executors, on pain of losing their legacies, to burn all his manuscripts; he had nearly completed a volume on the demonology of the ancients. He supplied Samuel Palmer with some details of Hugh Owen for the Nonconformist's Memorial (1775). Six of his letters to Isaac Toms of Hadleigh, Suffolk, are printed with the 'Memoirs.'
