= Caleb Ashworth =

British carpenter and dissenting tutor (1722–1775)

- Born: 1722; Cloughfold, England, Great Britain
- Died: 18 July 1775 (aged 52–53)
- Children: 3 sons and daughters

Caleb Ashworth, D.D. (1722 – 18 July 1775) was an English dissenting tutor.

== Life ==
Ashworth was born in Cloughfold in 1722. His father, Richard Ashworth, who died in 1751, aged 84, was a lay preacher among the Particular Baptists; he had three sons—Thomas, Particular Baptist minister at Heckmondwike; Caleb; and John, a General Baptist minister, colleague of Dr. James Foster, who preached his funeral sermon in 1742.

Caleb Ashworth was originally a carpenter; he probably was not in sympathy with his father's views, and thus did not at first turn to the ministry. He was afterwards educated for the independent ministry, under Philip Doddridge, at Northampton, where he first took up his quarters in 1739; and settled at Daventry in 1746, originally as assistant to James Floyd.

Under Doddridge's will, the management of the academy was left to Ashworth, and, as the Northampton congregation did not elect him their minister, he moved it to Daventry in 1752 (see Daventry Academy). He obtained the degree of D.D. from Scotland in 1759. He died on 18 July 1775.

== Influence ==
Under Ashworth, Daventry Academy became a leading seat of culture among liberal independents and presbyterians, who at that time were close, and shared views on theology and church polity. A list of his students is in Monthly Repository, 1822. The academy covered languages, biblical criticism, and ecclesiastical history quite weakly; its staple was dogmatics and philosophy, including psychology (then called pneumatology), ethics, and physics. Ashworth published for his academy a Hebrew Grammar.

His most distinguished scholar was Joseph Priestley, who says that Ashworth took "the orthodox side of every question" in theology and philosophy, the sub-tutor, Samuel Clark, "that of heresy". Doddridge's plan of referring to authors on all sides of every question, and requiring his students to give an account of them, was pursued by his successors. Rev. T. Thomas, a former pupil says: "Under Dr. Doddridge there was a more popular exterior; under Dr. Ashworth a more disciplined interior."

== Family ==
He married a Miss Hemings, and together they had three sons and three daughters. His son John entered Daventry Academy in 1760, but became a grazier.
