= William Coward (merchant) =

London merchant and supporter of nonconformism

- Born: William Coward ca. 1648; London, England
- Died: ca. 1738
- Education: Daventry Academy and Hoxton Academy
- Occupation(s): Merchant, proselytiser, theologican, minister and philanthropist

William Coward (1648–1738) was a London merchant in the Jamaica trade, remembered for his support of English Dissenters, particularly his educational philanthropy.

== Life ==
After a period in Jamaica, where he built up an estate (see Sugar plantations in the Caribbean), he retired to Walthamstow in 1685, and built an Independent meeting house there, with Hugh Farmer as the first minister. He became known for strict household arrangements, his doors being closed against visitors at 8 pm. He was spoken of as eccentric in his old age and he had a very public quarrel with Thomas Bradbury.

Coward instituted a course of 26 lectures On the most important Doctrines of the Gospel, in the church of Paved Alley, Lime Street, London; they were published in two volumes in 1730-1 and became known as the "Lime Street Lectures". A total of nine preachers took part, among them Abraham Taylor and John Gill. (This was not the first lecture series Coward had sponsored: the first was at Little St Helen's in 1726.) A third course took place at Bury Street, St Mary Axe, in 1733, this last set being printed in 1735. These lecture series retained their influence a century later, Samuel Miller writing that "The Lime Street and Bury Street Lectures, contain some of the most able, useful, and pious disquisitions of the English dissenting divines."

In the spring of 1734 he contemplated founding a dissenting academy at Walthamstow, for the education of children of Dissenters for the ministry, and the post of professor of divinity was offered to Philip Doddridge, after hesitations over whether Taylor should have the position. The scheme itself came to nothing, although Coward continued, while alive, to assist the poorer ministers and to aid in the teaching of their children. He died at Walthamstow on 28 April 1738, aged ninety.

== Legacy ==
Coward's property was valued at £150,000, and the bulk was said to have been left in charity in a will dated 25 November 1735. Property was left in trust "for the education and training up of young men ... between 15 and 22, to qualify them for the ministry of the gospel among the protestant dissenters." There were four trustees of the Coward Trust, including initially Isaac Watts and Daniel Neal, who were to take care that the students should be instructed according to "the assembly's catechism, and in that method of church discipline which is practised by the congregational churches."

For many years two educational institutions, conveniently known as Daventry Academy and Hoxton Academy (both moved their locations at need), were almost entirely maintained from the income of the trusts.

In the London region (in fact east of the city as it then was, in the area of Hackney) there was an academy run first by David Jennings, a Bury Street lecturer and another of the original trustees, then taken over by Samuel Morton Savage, who moved it after 1762 from his own residence in Wellclose Square to Hoxton Square. The London establishment relied on the Coward Trust after withdrawal of support from the Independent or Congregational Fund Board, and for some period had no students underwritten by the Presbyterian Fund Board; it never achieved the same reputation as Daventry, despite having Andrew Kippis and Abraham Rees (a former pupil of Jennings) as tutors. Among its well-known pupils was William Godwin, refused entry to the nearby Homerton Academy on suspicion of Sandemanian tendencies, and a student at the Hoxton Academy from 1773. In 1785 the grant was withdrawn from the Hoxton Academy.

The "Daventry" academy took over Doddridge's Northampton establishment, in which Coward had earlier shown an interest. Its best-known student was Joseph Priestley. In 1833, following several moves, it relocated to London, to Byng Place, south of the Catholic Apostolic Church, where its final home had been built by Thomas Cubitt the year before. Here it was known as Coward College and "remained as a residential College for Theological Students until May, 1850", when it merged, with two other academies, into New College London. An account of these training colleges is in the official Calendar of the Associated Colleges, pp. 41–50.

== See also ==
- List of founders of English schools and colleges
- Sugar plantations in the Caribbean
