= George Burder =

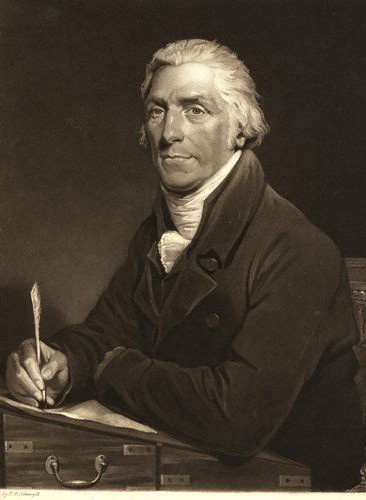
George Burder, 1812 mezzotint by Henry Hoppner Meyer, after Henry William Pickersgill.

George Burder (May 25, 1752 O.S. – May 29, 1832) was an English Nonconformist divine.

== Biography ==
Burder was born in London. In his early twenties he was an engraver, but in 1776 he began preaching, and was minister of the Independent church at Lancaster from 1778 to 1783. Subsequently he held charges at Coventry (1784–1803) and at Fetter Lane, London (1803–1832). He was one of the founders of the British and Foreign Bible Society, the Religious Tract Society, and the London Missionary Society, and was secretary to the last-named for several years. As editor of the Evangelical Magazine and author of Village Sermons (translated into several European languages), he commanded a wide influence. He died on 29 May 1832, and the following year A Life (by Henry Forster Burder) was published.

One of his grandsons, George Bernard Burder (1814–1881) converted to Roman Catholicism and became Abbot of Mount St Bernard Abbey in Leicestershire.

== Publications ==
- Village Sermons
- Pneumatologia, Or, A Discourse Concerning the Holy Spirit
- Essays to Do Good
