= Independent College, Homerton =

Independent College, later Homerton Academy, was a dissenting academy in Homerton just outside London, England, in the 18th and early 19th centuries.

== Background ==
In 1695 the Congregational Fund was set up in London to provide for the education of Calvinist ministers, and to provide an alternative to the education offered by the Universities of Oxford and Cambridge, which was barred by law to English Dissenters. Around 35 of these so-called dissenting academies arose during the 18th century, offering education without the requirement of conformity to the Church of England. They promoted a more modern curriculum of science, philosophy and modern history than the ancient universities who took a more traditionalist approach to learning. One of these was the Independent College, Homerton, which appointed Dr John Conder as President in 1754. It was supported by the King's Head Society.

In 1850 the union of the Homerton establishment with Daventry Academy and Highbury College resulted in the creation of New College London.

== Foundation ==
Homerton College was known as King's Head Academy when it moved in 1768/69 from Plaisterers' Hall, London, to a large house on the north side of the high street of Homerton, in the parish of Hackney, close to London, in which they sought to base all their teaching. The trustees were appointed by the King's Head Society and were strict Calvinists. From 1817 the trustees were appointed by the Homerton Academy Society instead of by the King's Head Society. The name was changed to Homerton College in 1823.

== Teachers and students ==
Dr John Conder was the theological tutor at Plaisterer's Hall Academy in 1754; and residential tutor and theological tutor at Mile End Academy (1754 to 1769) then the theological tutor at Homerton Academy (1769 to 1781). Dr. Daniel Fisher was the resident tutor at Homerton Academy (1771 to 1781); then the theology tutor (1781 to 1803). From 1800 John Pye-Smith one of the best known non-conformist theologians of his day, was residential tutor and in effect principal at Homerton from 1805 to 1850. The college boasted several members of distinction: one of its tutors, Henry Mayo, was described by James Boswell as Samuel Johnson’s "literary anvil"; another was offered a Doctorate of Divinity by Yale College.

The college only ever had between 12 and 20 students at any time. In 1819 the society supported 12 of the 18 students with the remain 6 supported by the Congregational Fund Board. This allowed the college to train ministers who came from the poorer non-conformist communities, such as Ezekiel Blomfield, who led congregations in Wymondham, Harleston and Wortwell in Norfolk. Ministers trained at the college also chose to become missionaries, such as William Ellis, and Edward Stallybrass, who became a Congregational missionary with the London Missionary Society to the Buryat people of Siberia.

== Evolution into Homerton College, Cambridge ==
In 1824, the building itself was added to and partially rebuilt. Not long afterwards, following the liberalisation of access to English universities, the work of the dissenting academies could become mainstream. University College London became the first English university to admit students without a need for conformity to the Established Church. In 1850, the College was re-founded by the Congregational Board of Education, to concentrate on the study of education itself. It did so by transferring its theological courses to New College London, of which the Rev. John Harris DD was Congregationalist Principal. The Congregational Board purchased the buildings at Hackney, and the students and staff moved into the vacant college buildings at Cambridge in 1894. Initially taking the name of Homerton New College at Cavendish College, it shortly became just Homerton College, Cambridge, with John Charles Horobin as the first principal.
