= List of places of worship in London, 1804 =

This is a list of places of worship in London, 1804.

It is based on a list in A View of London, or, The Stranger's Guide through the British Metropolis (1804), headed "An Impartial List of the Principal Churches, Chapels, and Meeting-Houses". The choice lay in fact among Protestant places of worship. Some of the information was not quite current, ministers having died.

The Guide excluded Quaker meeting-houses. "Stranger churches", Roman Catholic chapels, and synagogues were listed in The Picture of London (1807).

Terminology at the time was variable: "meeting-house" and "chapel" were interchangeable, as were "Independent" and "congregational". Dissenters were usually classed under the "Three Denominations" (Presbyterian, Independent and Baptist). Methodists were sharply divided into the Calvinistic Methodists, who typically followed George Whitefield or preachers of the Countess of Huntingdon's Connexion, and the Wesleyans. Unitarian congregations were only just being distinguished as anti-Trinitarians, from Arians. The New Jerusalem Church (Swedenborgians) was not included in the selections by the View.

== A ==
| Place of worship | Denomination | Preacher(s) | Continuity and comments |
|---|---|---|---|
| St Ann Blackfriars | Anglican | William Goode the elder, Payne |
| St Antholin, Watling Street | Anglican | Henry Jerome de Salis (rector), Henry Draper (curate), | George Bailey curate from 1808. The lecturers Draper, Wilkinson, Foster and Mann (a protégé of William Augustus Gunn) were suspected of sympathy with Methodism. A William Mann was lecturer in Bermondsey in 1831. |
| Aldermary Church | Anglican | Wilkinson |
| Adelphi Chapel, Strand | ?congregational |
| Aldermanbury Postern Meeting-house | | Thomas Towle, Joseph Barber |
| Alie Street Meeting-house, Goodman's Fields | | Morgan, Shenston, Oates | John Brittain Shenston was initially a General Baptist. |
| Artillery Street Meeting-house, Bishopsgate | | Upton | Later Baptist |
| All Hallows, Lombard Street | Anglican | William Jarvis Abdy |

== B ==
| Place of worship | Denomination | Preacher(s) | Continuity and comments |
|---|---|---|---|
| Barbican Meeting-house | Independent | John Towers | Younger brother of Joseph Towers. Secession from Jewin Street. |
| Bartholomew Close Meeting-house | Presbyterian | William Braithwait |
| Bentinck Chapel, Paddington | Anglican | Basil Woodd |
| Bishopsgate Church (St Botolph-without-Bishopsgate) | Anglican | Samuel Crowther |
| Bow Church, Cheapside (St Mary Aldermary) | Anglican | WJ Abdy |
| Bow Lane Meeting-house | Secession Church | William Jerment |
| Dissenters' Chapel, Brentford Butts | | Nicholas T. Heineken |
| Bury Street Meeting-house, St Mary Axe | Independent | Thomas Beck | Beck succeeded Samuel Morton Savage in 1788. He was himself succeeded by Henry Heap. |
| St Bartholomew's Meeting-house, West Smithfield | | Watkins, Mason |
| Battersea Meeting-house | Baptist | Joseph Hughes |
| Bethnal Green Meeting-house | Congregational | John Kello | Kello succeeded John Walker in 1771, was minister to 1827. |

== C ==
| Place of worship | Denomination | Preacher(s) | Continuity and comments |
|---|---|---|---|
| Camden Chapel, Peckham | Anglican foundation, Calvinistic Methodist | | Founded late 1790s as a chapel-of-ease. |
| Chapel Street, Soho | Baptist | Thomas Stollery | Stollery (Stollerie) was originally an assistant to John Trotter in Swallow Street, leaving with some of the congregation. |
| Colliers Rents, Long Lane, Southwark | Independent | James Knight | Knight from 1791; John Rogers from 1745 to c.1791. |
| City Chapel, Grub Street | Independent | John Bradford | Bradford was an Independent, there 1797 to 1805; his successor was William Wales Horne, a Baptist. |
| Carey Street Meeting-house | Independent | William Thorp | Predecessor Richard Winter; Thorp (1800–1805) was succeeded by Robert Winter. Congregation founded by Thomas Bradbury in 1728. |
| Cumberland Street Chapel | | John Brown | Calvinistic Methodist in the 1830s. |
| City Road (Wesley's Chapel) |
| Church Street Chapel, Mile End Road | Calvinist Methodist | John Cottingham | Founded as an Anglican chapel of ease, taken over by nonconformists by the 1790s; Cottingham was succeeded by George Evans in 1808. |
| Carter Lane Meeting-house, Tooley Street | Particular Baptist | John Rippon | Preceded by John Gill (died 1771). |
| Carter Lane, St Paul's | English Presbyterian | Tayler | "...the most respectable meeting-house the dissenters have in the metropolis", according to the Anti-Jacobin. According to the Unitarian Historical Society, this was the origins of the congregation that in 1862 removed to Islington and in the 21st century became New Unity. |
| Crown Court Meeting-house or Chapel, Covent Garden | Church of Scotland (Presbyterian) | James Steven | Steven was at the Crown Court Chapel from 1787 to 1803. Previously, William Cruden had been minister there, from 1773 to 1785. Steven was succeeded in 1805 by George Greig. |
| Camomile Street Meeting-house | | Reynolds, Charles Buck | Buck's congregation met there as a temporary measure, from 1802 to 1804, before moving to Wilson Street. |
| Christ Church, Spitalfields | Anglican | Davies, Cecil |
| Christ Church, Newgate Street | | Crowder |
| Church Lane Meeting-house, Whitechapel | | D. Taylor |
| Clapham Church | | John Venn |
| Clapham Meeting-house | Baptist | John Ovington |
| Clapham Independent | | Phillips |

== D ==
| Place of worship | Denomination | Preacher(s) | Continuity and comments |
|---|---|---|---|
| Deptford Meeting-house, Butt Lane | Independent | John Theodore Barker, from 1785 | Succeeded John Olding. To c.1833, when his successor John Pulling was ordained. |
| Deptford, Church Street | General Baptist | William Moon | Joseph Brown died 1803 |
| Dean Street Meeting-house, Tooley Street | Baptist | William Button | Button was minister from 1774 to 1813. |
| Devonshire Square Meeting-house | Particular Baptist | Timothy Thomas | Thomas was son of Joshua Thomas (DNB), and was minister from 1782, succeeding John Macgowan. |
| St Dunstan's Fleet Street | Anglican | Henry George Watkins |
| Dulwich Meeting-house |

== E ==
| Place of worship | Denomination | Preacher(s) | Continuity and comments |
|---|---|---|---|
| Eagle Street Meeting-house | Particular Baptist | | Congregation of Andrew Gifford. Joseph Ivimey from October 1804. |
| Ebenezer Chapel Hammersmith | Congregational | | Built 1784. |
| Ely Chapel, Holborn | Anglican | Shepherd, William Mann | Medieval building. |
| Elim Chapel, Fetter Lane | Baptist | Abraham Austin | Austin from 1785; previously used by Calvinistic Methodists. |
| East Lane Meeting-house, Walworth | Baptist | Joseph Jenkins |
| Essex Street Chapel | Unitarian | John Disney |

== F ==
| Place of worship | Denomination | Preacher(s) | Continuity and comments |
|---|---|---|---|
| Fetter Lane Meeting-house | Congregational | George Burder | Burder was minister from 1803. |
| Fetter Lane | | Austin |
| Founder's Hall | | Anthony Crole | In Colebrook Row, Islington. |

== G ==
| Place of worship | Denomination | Preacher(s) | Continuity and comments |
|---|---|---|---|
| St George's Southwark | Anglican | Draper, Payne |
| St George's Chapel, London Road | Congregational | Thomas Harper |
| St Giles in the Fields | | John Shephard | Holborn. |
| Greenwich Chapel |
| Gate Street Chapel, Lincoln's Inn Fields | Calvinistic Methodist | Griffith Williams | Thomas Stevenson, James Durrant (resigned 1839); congregation moved to Whitefield Chapel, Charles Street, Long Acre c.1842 |
| Green-walk Meeting-house, Blackfriars Road | Baptist | James Upton | Upton died 1834. |
| Gravel Lane Chapel, Wapping |

== H ==
| Place of worship | Denomination | Preacher(s) | Continuity and comments |
|---|---|---|---|
| Haberdashers Almshouses Chapel | | Wilkinson |
| Hackney, Gravel Pits | Independent/Unitarian | Thomas Belsham, John Kentish | Kentish was afternoon preacher from 1795. |
| Hampstead Meeting-house | | Wraith |
| Hanover Street, Long Acre | | Worthington, Winter |
| Highgate Meeting-house | | Porter |
| Highgate Presbyterian | | Pike |
| Hammersmith Meeting-house | | Porter |
| Hammersmith Independents | | Humphries |
| Hare-court Meeting-house, Aldersgate Street | | Webb |
| Highbury Chapel |
| Horsleydown Meeting-house | | Hunt |
| Hoxton Academy Meeting-house |
| Hoxton Chapel |
| Homerton Chapel | Independent | John Eyre | Previously known as Ram's Chapel. Eyre was an evangelical, ordained in the Church of England, associated with Trevecca College. |
| Holywell Mount Chapel | | Platt |
| Hackney Meeting-house | Independent | Samuel Palmer | Palmer came to Mare Street, Hackney in 1762, as assistant to William Hunt. He moved the Mare Street congregation to St. Thomas's Square, in 1771, having become pastor in 1764. He was succeeded by Henry Forster Burder. |

== I ==
| Place of worship | Denomination | Preacher(s) | Continuity and comments |
|---|---|---|---|
| Islington Chapel | Calvinistic Methodist | Evan John Jones |
| Islington Meeting-house | Independent | Nathaniel Jennings | Lower-Street Chapel, where Jennings was minister from 1768 to 1814. |

== J ==
| Place of worship | Denomination | Preacher(s) | Continuity and comments |
|---|---|---|---|
| Jewry Street Chapel | Calvinistic Methodist | John Ball | After the tenure of William Aldridge to 1797, the chapel was held by Richard Povah to 1801; who was succeeded by Ball. Ball died in 1811. |
| Jamaica Row Meeting-house, Rotherhithe | Baptist | Phillips |
| Jamaica Row Meeting-house, Rotherhithe | Independent | John Townsend |
| St John Horseleydown | Anglican | Abdy |
| St John's Wapping | Anglican | William Goode |
| St John's Chapel, Bedford Row | Anglican | Richard Cecil | Daniel Wilson in 1809. |
| Jewin Street Meeting-house | | Timothy Priestley |

== K ==
| Place of worship | Denomination | Preacher(s) | Continuity and comments |
|---|---|---|---|
| Kensington Chapel | Congregational | John Clayton, junior | Son of John Clayton (1754–1843). |
| Kingsland Road Meeting-house | Independent | John Campbell | Campbell was there from 1802. |
| Kentish Town Meeting-house |

== L ==
| Place of worship | Denomination | Preacher(s) | Continuity and comments |
|---|---|---|---|
| Lambeth Road Meeting-house | | Brackston |
| Lambeth Marsh Chapel | Wesleyan | John Edwards, lay preacher |
| Leather Lane, Holborn | | William Hughes | Hughes, minister 1798 to 1802, had in fact died by 1804. This was the congregation of Thomas Bayes, and had broken up. |
| Lewisham Chapel |
| Little Wild Street Meeting-house | Baptist | Benjamin Coxhead | Congregation founded by John Piggott |
| Locke Chapel | | Scott |
| Lock's-fields Meeting-house | Congregational | | York Street Chapel in Walworth was founded in 1790; "Lock's-fields Meeting-house" was the older name. George Burder was preaching here in 1809. |
| Long Acre Chapel | | Henry Foster, Edward Cuthbert |
| St Lawrence's Guildhall | Anglican | Davies, Goode |
| London-stone Church, Cannon Street (St Swithin, London Stone) | | Foster |
| London Wall, Scots Church | | Henry Hunter | Hunter had died in 1802. Robert Young was there in 1809. |

== M ==
| Place of worship | Denomination | Preacher(s) | Continuity and comments |
|---|---|---|---|
| St Margaret's Lothbury | Anglican | Carter, Armstrong |
| St Margaret Pattens, Rood Lane | Anglican | John Grose |
| Maze Pond Meeting-house | Baptist | James Dore | Dore was minister from 1782, succeeding Benjamin Wallin. |
| St Mary Magdalen's, Bermondsey | Anglican | Henry Cox Mason | Mason died in 1804, and was replaced by William Mann. |
| St Mary Woolnoth, Lombard Street | Anglican | John Newton |
| St Mary Somerset's, Labour-in-vain-hill | Anglican | William Alphonsus Gunn, lecturer |
| St Mary's Chapel, Broad Way, Westminster | | Davies |
| Miles Lane Meeting-house | Secession Church | Easton | The meeting-house had housed the Independent congregation of Stephen Addington, who died in 1796. |
| Mill Yard | | Slater |
| Mitchell Street Meeting-house, Old Street | | Powell |
| St Mildred Bread Street | Anglican | John Neal Lake |
| St Michael Crooked Lane | Anglican | Armstrong |
| Monkwell Street | | Lindsey |

== N ==
| Place of worship | Denomination | Preacher(s) | Continuity and comments |
|---|---|---|---|
| New Broad Street Meeting-house | | Benjamin Gaffee |
| Newington Butts Chapel | | Poveh |
| Newington Green Church | | Shepherd |
| Newington, Stoke | | Hodgkins |
| Newington Green Chapel | Independent/Unitarian | Rochemont Barbauld, Lindsey |
| New Road Chapel, St George's East | | Samuel Lyndall |
| Nine Elms Meeting-house | | | Opened 1797, near Vauxhall. |

== O ==
| Place of worship | Denomination | Preacher(s) | Continuity and comments |
|---|---|---|---|
| Old Ford Meeting-house | Baptist | William Newman |
| Orange Street Chapel, Leicester Fields | Congregational | | Taken over from the Church of England in 1787. |
| Old Gravel Lane, Wapping | Independent | N. Hill | The congregation of David Jennings. |
| Old Jewry Meeting-house | Presbyterian | Abraham Rees |
| St Olave's, Southwark | Anglican | John Grose |

== P ==
| Place of worship | Denomination | Preacher(s) | Continuity and comments |
|---|---|---|---|
| Paddington Meeting-house | | | None active in 1810. |
| Paradise Chapel, Chelsea | | Isaac Picket, Duncan, Buckland | Registered for an Independent congregation in 1793. |
| Parliament Court Chapel, Bishopsgate Street | Universalist | William Vidler | Vidler was succeeded in 1817 by William Johnson Fox. |
| Pavement Meeting-house, Moorfields | | William Wall |
| St Paul's Shadwell | Anglican | William Winkworth |
| Peckham Meeting-house | Congregational | William Bengo' Collyer | Later rebuilt as Hanover Chapel |
| Prince's Street Chapel, Westminster | Unitarian | Thomas Jervis | Jervis succeeded Andrew Kippis in 1796. |
| Providence Chapel, Tichfield Street | | William Huntington |
| St Peter's Cornhill | | Basil Woodd, Foster |
| Poplar Chapel |

== Q ==
| Place of worship | Denomination | Preacher(s) | Continuity and comments |
|---|---|---|---|
| Queen Street Chapel, Bloomsbury | | | Thomas Francklin had a proprietary chapel in Queen Street. |
| Queen Street Chapel, Cheapside | Anglican | Davis |
| Queen Street, Borough | | Shenstone |

== R ==
| Place of worship | Denomination | Preacher(s) | Continuity and comments |
|---|---|---|---|
| Red Lion Court, Spitalfields | | Humphries |
| Red Cross Street Meeting-house | Particular Baptist | John Wilson, Robert Burnside | During the 1790s the meeting-house was used by Swedenborgians. The Particular Baptist congregation of Currier's Hall, under Wilson then moved there, as did Burnside's. Wilson was dismissed in 1807, and his congregation dropped out; a Baptist secession from the Little Alie Street congregation (Shenstone) replaced it. |
| Rose Lane Meeting-house, Radcliffe | Baptist | Thomas Williams | Williams was minister at Rose Lane for over 50 years. |
| Rosemary Branch Meeting-house, Goodman's Fields | Particular Baptist | Abraham Booth | "Rosemary Branch Alley" was the old name: it had become known as Little Prescot Street by 1800. |

== S ==
| Place of worship | Denomination | Preacher(s) | Continuity and comments |
|---|---|---|---|
| Salters' Hall | Presbyterian | Winter, Hugh Worthington |
| Shoreditch Workhouse | | Armstrong |
| Shore-place Meeting-house, Hackney | | Rance |
| Surrey Chapel | | Rowland Hill |
| Silver Street Meeting-house | Calvinistic Methodist | Robert Caldwell | Caldwell succeeded Thomas Wills at Silver Street. He died in 1803. |
| Sion Chapel, Whitechapel |
| St Saviour's Southwark | Lady Huntingdon's Connexion | William Winkworth | William Mann replaced Winkworth in 1804. |
| St Thomas | | Mann |
| Spa Fields Chapel |
| St Thomas, Borough (Southwark) | Unitarian | John Kentish, John Coates | Kentish from 1802. The congregation founded by Nathaniel Vincent was initially Presbyterian. |
| Stepney Meeting-house | Independent | George Ford | Ford succeeded Samuel Brewer in 1796. Joseph Fletcher from 1823. |
| Staining Lane Meeting-house | | Brooksbank |
| Swallow Street Meeting-house | Scottish Presbyterian | John Trotter, John Nicoll | Piccadilly. Founded by James Anderson, a Scottish Presbyterian, who purchased a lease on a Huguenot chapel, and renewed it (1729); or had a new meeting-house built. The lease was bought in 1884 by Charles Voysey. |
| Stratford Meeting-house | | Gould |
| Snowfields Chapel |
| Store Street Meeting-house, Bloomsbury | | John Martin |
| Somers Town Chapel | | Jerman |

== T ==
| Place of worship | Denomination | Preacher(s) | Continuity and comments |
|---|---|---|---|
| Tabernacle, City Road |
| Tottenham Court Road Chapel | Calvinistic Methodist |
| Trinity Chapel, Battle Bridge | | Sowerby |

== U ==
| Place of worship | Denomination | Preacher(s) | Continuity and comments |
|---|---|---|---|
| Unicorn Yard, Tooley Street | Particular Baptist | Thomas Hutchings |
| Union Street Meeting-house, Southwark | Independent | John Humphreys |
| United Brethren's Chapel, Fetter Lane | Moravian | Christian Ignatius Latrobe | Latrobe succeeded his father Benjamin Latrobe, who died in 1786, but his work was not mainly centred on the chapel. |

== W ==
| Place of worship | Denomination | Preacher(s) | Continuity and comments |
|---|---|---|---|
| Walthamstow Meeting-house | Congregational | George Collison | In Marsh Street. |
| Weigh House Meeting-house, Eastcheap | Independent | John Clayton |
| Wells Street Meeting-house, Oxford Street | | Alexander Waugh |
| White's Row Chapel | Congregational | John Goode | Goode was minister from 1792 to 1826, succeeding Nathaniel Trotman, and being followed by Henry Towneley. The congregation moved in 1836, to Bury Street Chapel, building Bishopsgate Chapel. Shortly afterwards Robert Crawford Dillon set up his new church in White's Row. |
| Woolwich Chapel | Calvinistic Methodist | Joseph Piercy | Handed to his brother by William Piercy. |
| Worship Street, Moorfields | General Baptist. | John Evans, Simpson |

== See also ==
- List of places of worship in London, 1738
