= Francis Fuller =

Francis Fuller may refer to:

- Francis Fuller the Elder (c. 1637–1701), English nonconformist minister
- Francis Fuller the Younger (1670–1706), English medical writer
- Francis Fuller (British Army officer) (died 1748)
- Francis Charles Fuller (1866–1944), chief commissioner to the Ashanti Empire
- Francis Fuller, surveyor and railway entrepreneur, father of the feminist and socialist activist Dora Montefiore

== See also ==
- Frank Fuller (disambiguation)
- Frances Fuller (disambiguation)
