= John Duncan Tate =

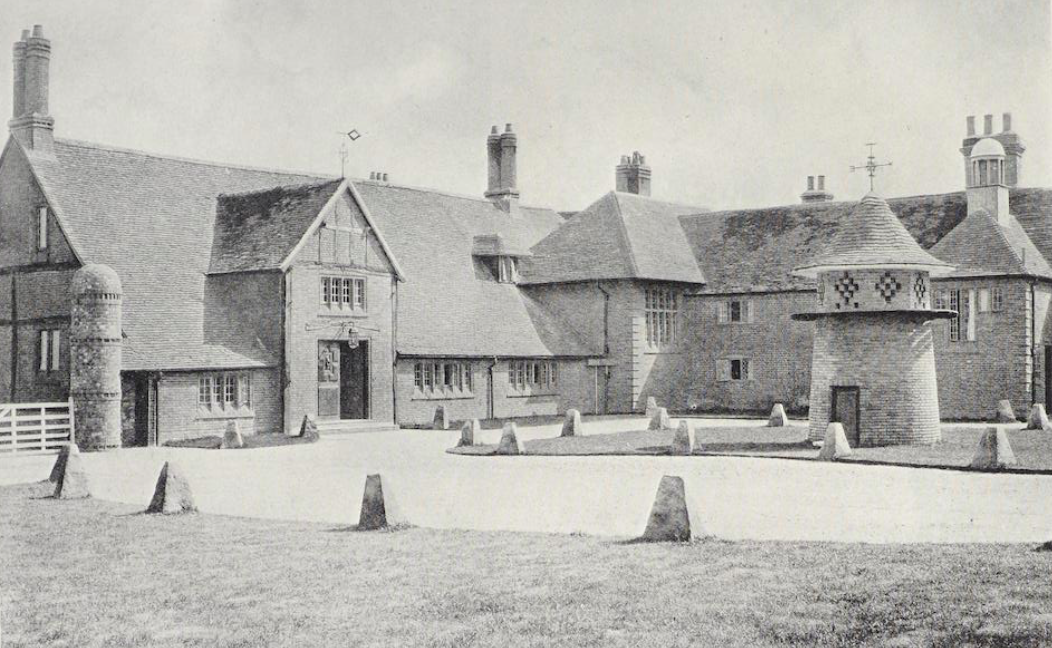
Little Pednor

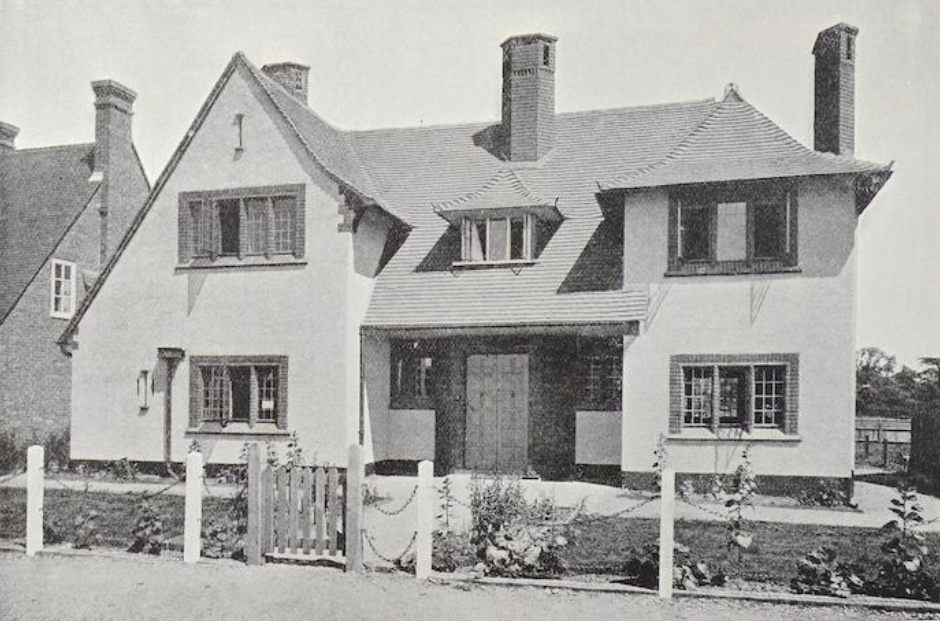
40 Parkway, Gidea Park, Romford

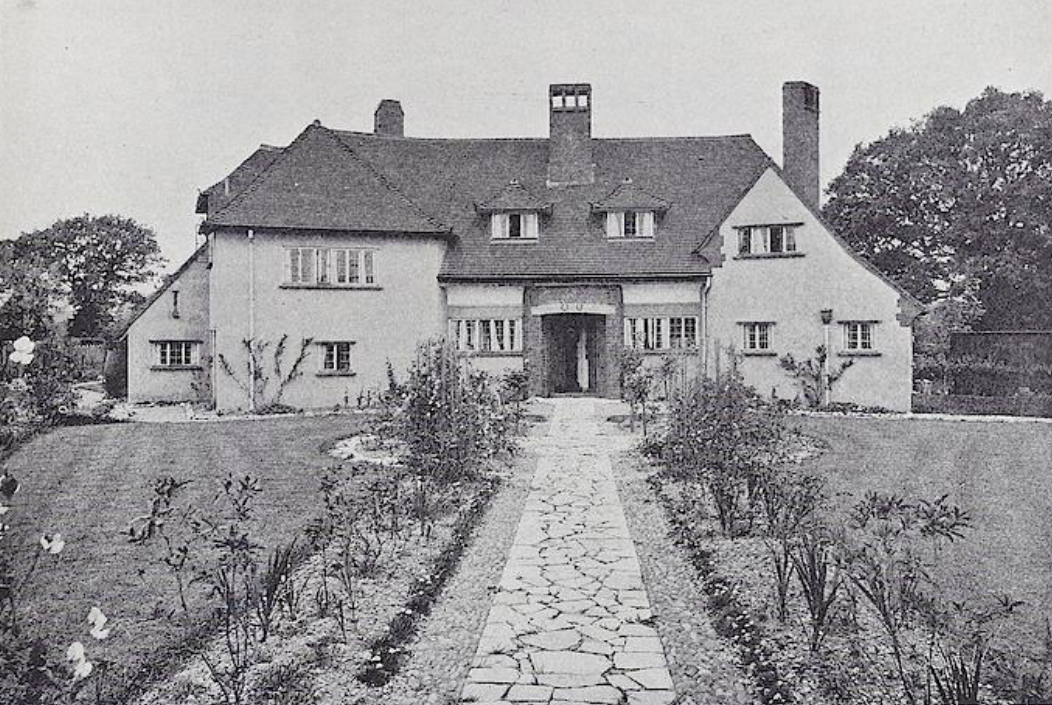
Brantfell, Gerrards Cross

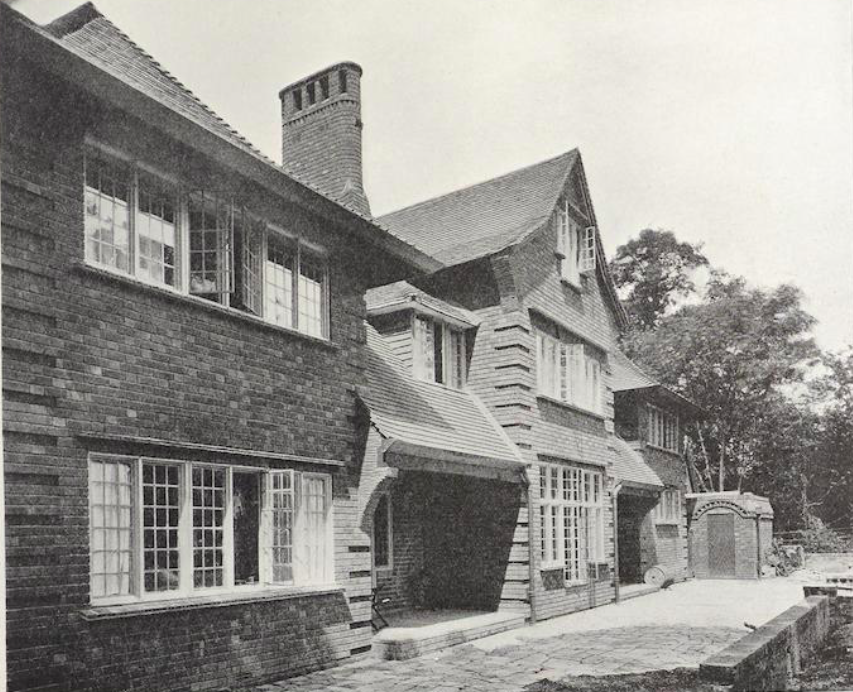
The Pillars, Northwood

John Duncan Tate FRIBA (1880 - 28 November 1930) was an architect primarily based in London from 1905 to 1930 partnership with James Edwin Forbes.

== Architectural career ==
He was articled to James Edmeston and Edward Gabriel from 1898 to 1901, and then assistant to James Edwin Forbes in Birmingham. In 1902 he became assistant to C.E. MacPherson where he remained until 1905 when he established the partnership of Forbes and Tate in London with James Edwin Forbes.

He was nominated LRIBA in 1910 and FRIBA in 1915.

== Personal life ==
He was born in 1880, the son of Frederick Tate (b. 1848) and Alice Edith Duncan (1854 - 1946). He married Annie Stewart Holl, daughter of William Huet Holl of Assam and Retford, at St Margaret's Church, Lee on 22 June 1907 and they had one child, a daughter Phyllis Tate (1911 - 1987).

He died on 28 November 1930 at 16 St Andrews Mansions, Dorset Street, London, and left an estate valued at £2,970 7s 5d.

== Works ==
- Pollard's Wood House, Nightingale Lane, Chalfont St Giles 1906
- The Sheiling, Chalfont St Giles 1907 (built as his own house)
- The Pollards, Oval Way, Gerrards Cross
- Brown Cottage, Oval Way, Gerrards Cross
- Kimberley, Oval Way, Gerrards Cross
- Pollards Park, Chalfont St Giles for Archibald Grove MP 1907
- Pollards Wood Grange, Buckinghamshire ca. 1909
- Little Pednor, Chartridge, 1910-12 (enlarged)
- Brantfell, Gerrards Cross, ca. 1911
- House at 40 Parkway, Gidea Park, Romford, ca. 1911
- The Pillars, Northwood, London ca. 1911
- Widenham House, West Common, Gerrards Cross
- Paddock House, West Common, Gerrard's Cross. ca 1913
- Baylins Farmhouse, Penn Road, Knotty Green 1919 (loggia addition)
- War Memorial Hall, Ballinger, Buckinghamshire 1922
- Barrington Court, Somerset 1921-25 (restoration)
- Beechams, Barrington Court, Somerset 1921-25
- House for J. Crook, Chalfont Road, Amersham 1928
