= List of places of worship in London, 1738 =

A list of places of worship in London was compiled for William Maitland's 1739 History of London. It is thought to be the first such list published that goes beyond Church of England churches and chapels, to include the full variety of religions practised formally in London. The list then appeared in other publications, for two decades at least, without regard to updating.

By denominations, it divides as below.

== Church of England ==
Listed 76 churches, 68 chapels.

Church	Incumbent	Auxiliary clergy	Comments and continuity
St Alban, Wood Street	Richard Sear or Seare, 1711–1743

- Allhallows, Barking Incumbent William Geekie (1733–1767)
- Allhallows, Bread Street apparently no incumbent
- Allhallows the Great Incumbent Christopher Hussey (1732–1761)
- Allhallows, Lombard Street
- Allhallows, London Wall
- Allhallows Staining
- St Alphage, Aldermanbury
- St Andrew Holborn
- St Andrew Undershaft St Andrew Undershaft With St Mary Axe, Location 11558; Berriman, William (1712 - 1762), inc. 26/04/1722 - 15/05/1762 ) ID 7677
- St Andrew Wardrobe
- St Anne Aldersgate
- St Antholin Budge Row
- St Augustin Watling Street
- St Bartholomew Exchange
- St Bartholomew the Great, Smithfield Richard Thomas Bateman
- St Bartholomew the Less Smithfield
- St Benedict Fink
- St Bennet Gracechurch
- St Bennet Paul's Wharf
- St Botolph Aldersgate
- St Botolph Aldgate
- St Botolph Bishopsgate
- St Bride Fleet Street
- Christ Church Newgate Street
- St Christopher Threadneedle Street
- St Clement Eastcheap
- St Dionis Backchurch
- St Dunstan in the East
- St Dunstan in the West
- St Edmund Lombard Street
- St Ethelburg Bishopgate Street
- St George Botolph Lane
- St Giles Cripplegate
- St Helen Bishopgate Street
- St James, Duke's Place
- St James Garlick Hill
- St Katherine Coleman Fenchurch Street
- St Katherine Cree
- St Katherine near the Tower
- St Lawrence Jewry
- St Magnus London Bridge
- St Margaret Lothbury
- St Margaret Pattens
- St Martin Ludgate
- St Martin Outwitch
- St Mary Abchurch
- St Mary Aldermanbury
- St Mary Aldermary
- St Mary le Bow
- St Mary at Hill
- St Mary Magdalen, Old Fish Street
- St Mary Somerset
- St Mary Woolnoth
- St Matthew Friday Street
- St Michael Bassishaw
- St Michael Cornhill
- St Michael Crooked Lane
- St Michael Queenhithe
- St Michael Royal
- St Michael Wood Street
- St Mildred Bread Street
- St Mildred Poultry
- St Nicholas Cole Abbey
- St Olave Hart Street
- St Olave Jewry
- St Peter ad Vincula
- St Peter Cornhill
- St Peter Le Poor
- St Sepulchre Snow Hill
- St Stephen Coleman Street
- St Stephen Walbrook
- St Swithin Walbrook
- Temple Church
- Trinity Minories
- St Vedast Foster Lane
- St Anne Dean Street
- St Clement Dane
- St George Hanover Square
- St James Piccadilly
- St John Baptist, the Savoy
- St John the Evangelist Horseferry
- St Margaret, Westminster
- St Martin, St Martin's Lane
- St Mary le Strand
- St Paul Covent Garden
- Christ Church, Spitalfields
- St Anne Limehouse
- St Dunstan, Stepney
- St George Bloomsbury
- St George Queen Square
- St George, Middlesex
- St Giles in the Field
- St James Clerkenwell
- St John Hackney
- St John Wapping
- St Leonard Shoreditch
- St Luke Old Street
- St Mary Islington
- St Mary Whitechapel
- St Paul Shadwell
- (St Catherine's by the Tower

== Presbyterians ==
Listed 28 meeting houses.

- Bethnal Green meeting: (de facto Independent) William Chapman, moved here from Lower Rotherhithe in 1704, to 1738; and William Sheffield from 1739. Chapman was the son of Samuel Chapman, an ejected minister of 1662 who later conformed. Sheffield was minister to 1755.
- Book House meeting, Clapton
- Church Street meeting, Hoxton
- Crosby Square meeting, Bishopsgate Street
- Crown Court meeting, Russell Street
- Founders Hall meeting, Lothbury
- Gravel Lane meeting, Houndsditch; Gravel Pit Chapel, George Smith
- Great St Thomas Apostles meeting
- Hanover Street meeting, Longacre
- King's Weigh-house meeting, Little Eastcheap
- Leather Lane meeting, Holborn; Joshua Bayes from 1723 (ODNb)
- Little Carter Lane meeting, Samuel Wright at Carter Lane (ODNB)
- Little St. Helens meeting, Bishopgate Street
- Maiden Lane meeting, Deadman's Place
- Middlesex Court meeting, Bartholomew Close
- Mourning Lane meeting, Hackney
- New Broad Street meeting, London Wall
- Old Bailey meeting
- Old Jewry meeting, Poultry; Old Jewry Meeting-house, Samuel Chandler
- Parish Street meeting, Horsleydown
- Poor Jewry Lane meeting, near Aldgate; William Harris, replaced 1740 by George Benson (ODNB)
- Rampant Lion Yard meeting, Nightingale Lane
- Salters Hall meeting, Swithin's Lane
- Shakespear's Walk meeting, Upper Shadwell
- Silver Street meeting, Wood Street
- Swallow Street meeting, Piccadilly; James Anderson 1734 to Lisle Street chapel, Leicester Fields
- Windsor Court meeting, Monkwell Street

== Independents ==
Listed 26 meeting houses.

- Boar's Head Yard meeting, Petticoat Lane
- Brickhill Lane meeting, Thames Street
- Broad Street meeting, near Old Gravel Lane
- Court Yard meeting, Barnaby Street
- Deadman's Place meeting, Southwark
- Hare Court meeting, Aldersgate Street
- Jewin Street meeting, Aldersgate Street
- Mare Street meeting, Hackney
- Nevil's Alley meeting, Fetter Lane
- New Broad Street meeting, Moorfields
- New Court meeting, Cary Street; Thomas Bradbury from 1728 (ODNB)
- Orchard meeting, Wapping
- Paved Alley meeting, Lime Street
- Pavement Row meeting, Moorfields
- Pinner Hall meeting, Broad Street
- Queen Street meeting, Ratcliff
- Queen Street meeting, Rotherhithe
- Red Cross Street meeting, Fore Street; Samuel Stockell 1728 to 1750
- Ropemaker's Alley meeting, Little Moorfields
- St Michael's Lane meeting, Cannon Street
- St Saviour's Dockhead meeting, Southwark
- Staining Lane meeting, Maiden Lane
- Stepney meeting, Stepney Fields
- Turners Hall meeting, Philpot Lane
- White Horse Yard meeting, Duke's Place
- Zoar Street meeting, Southwark

== Baptists ==
Listed 33 meeting houses.

- St John's Court Street meeting, Little Hart Street; Hart Street closed around 1738
- John Gill at Horselydown, Southwark, from 1720 (ODNB)

== Quakers ==
Listed 12 meeting houses.

- Bull and Mouth meeting, St Martin's Le Grand
- Ewer Street meeting, Southwark
- Fair Street meeting, Horsleydown
- Little Almonry meeting, Westminster
- Peel meeting, St John's Lane
- Quaker Street meeting, Spitalfields
- Sandy's Court meeting, Houndsditch
- School House Lane meeting, Ratcliff
- Savoy meeting, The Strand
- Wapping meeting, Wapping
- White Hart Yard meeting, Gracechurch Street
- Workhouse meeting, Clerkenwell

== Scottish Presbyterians ==
Listed three meeting houses.

== Chapels of Embassies ==
Listed six Catholic chapels.

== Other denominations ==
Chapels: one Catholic, three non-juror, two Muggletonian, two Camisard, meeting of Orator Henley.

== Stranger churches ==
Listed 21 Huguenot chapels, two Dutch churches, three Lutheran churches. Plus Danish, Swedish and Russian churches.

== Synagogues ==
Listed three synagogues

== See also ==
- List of places of worship in London, 1804

== Notes ==
- Source: https://archive.org/stream/universalpocket00unkngoog#page/n48/mode/2up
