= John Shower =

English nonconformist minister

John Shower (1657–1715) was a prominent English nonconformist minister.

== Life ==
The elder brother of Sir Bartholomew Shower, he was born at Exeter, and baptised on 18 May 1657. His father, William, a wealthy merchant, died about 1661, leaving a widow (Dorcas, daughter of John Anthony) and four sons. Shower was educated in turn at Exeter, and at Taunton under Matthew Warren. His mother moved with him to London, and he was taught by Edward Veal and at the Newington Green academy by Charles Morton.

In 1677, before he was twenty, he began to preach, on the advice of Morton and Thomas Manton Next year, in the period of the Popish Plot, a merchant's lecture was begun in the large room of a coffee-house in Exchange Alley. Four young preachers were chosen as evening lecturers, among them being Shower (with Theophilus Dorrington, Thomas Goodwin the younger and James Lambert). Shower was ordained on 24 December 1679 by five ejected ministers, headed by Richard Adams. He at once became (still retaining his lectureship) assistant to Vincent Alsop in Tothill Street, Westminster, and held this post till 1683, when Sir Samuel Barnardiston sent him abroad with two other young ministers as companions of his nephew, Samuel Barnardiston. They made the Grand Tour, visiting France, Switzerland, Italy, and the Rhine. At Amsterdam, in July 1684, they parted.

Shower remained in Holland till 1686. Returning to London, he resumed his lecture at Exchange Alley, but the pressure to which nonconformists were then subjected led him to return to Holland in the same year. He joined John Howe at Utrecht. At the end of 1687 he became evening lecturer in the English presbyterian church at Rotterdam, of which Joseph Hill was one of the pastors. He returned to London on receiving a call (19 January 1691) to succeed Daniel Williams as assistant to Howe at Silver Street. Here he was popular, and soon received a call to the pastorate of the presbyterian congregation at Curriers' Hall, London Wall, which he accepted on 8 May 1691. In this charge he remained till death, having been ‘married’ to his flock by Matthew Mead, as Edmund Calamy puts it. Twice he moved the congregation to larger meeting-houses, in Jewin Street (1692) and Old Jewry (1701), having successively as assistants Timothy Rogers (1658–1728) and Joseph Bennet.

Shower was a member of a club of ministers which, for some years from 1692, held weekly meetings at the house of Dr. Upton in Warwick Lane, Calamy being the leading spirit. He succeeded (1697) Samuel Annesley as one of the Tuesday lecturers at Salters' Hall. A fever, in May 1706, left his health permanently impaired. John Fox, who visited him in 1712, was impressed by his ‘state and pride.’ On 14 September 1713 he had a paralytic stroke at Epping. He was able to preach again, but retired from active duty on 27 March 1715. He died at Stoke Newington on 28 June 1715, and was buried at Highgate. His funeral sermon was preached on 10 July by William Tong.

== Works ==
He published twenty-one single sermons, including funeral sermons for Anne Barnardiston (1682), Richard Walter (1692), Queen Mary (1695), Nathaniel Oldfield (1696), Jane Papillon (1698), Nathaniel Taylor (1702), Nehemiah Grew, and an exhortation at the ordination of Thomas Bradbury; also

- ‘A Sermon Occasion'd by the Late Repentance and Funeral of a Young Man,’ 1681. 6th ed. printed for Sprint & Nicholson in Little Britain, 1707.
- ‘Practical Reflections on the late Earthquakes in Jamaica,’ 1693.
- ‘The Day of Grace … Four Sermons,’ 1694.
- ‘Family Religion, in Three Letters,’ 1694.
- ‘Some Account of the … Life … of Mr. Henry Gearing,’ 1694.
- ‘The Mourner's Companion,’ 1699 (2 parts).
- ‘God's Thoughts and Ways,’ 1699.
- ‘Heaven and Hell,’ 1700.
- ‘Sacramental Discourses,’ 1702 (2 parts).
- ‘Serious Reflections on Time and Eternity,’ 5th ed. 1707.

== Family ==
He married, first, on 24 September 1687, at Utrecht, Elizabeth Falkener (died 1691), niece of Thomas Papillon; secondly, on 29 December 1692, Constance White (died 18 July 1701), by whom three children survived him.
