= St Dunstan's, Stepney =

Church in London, England

St Dunstan and All Saints, Stepney
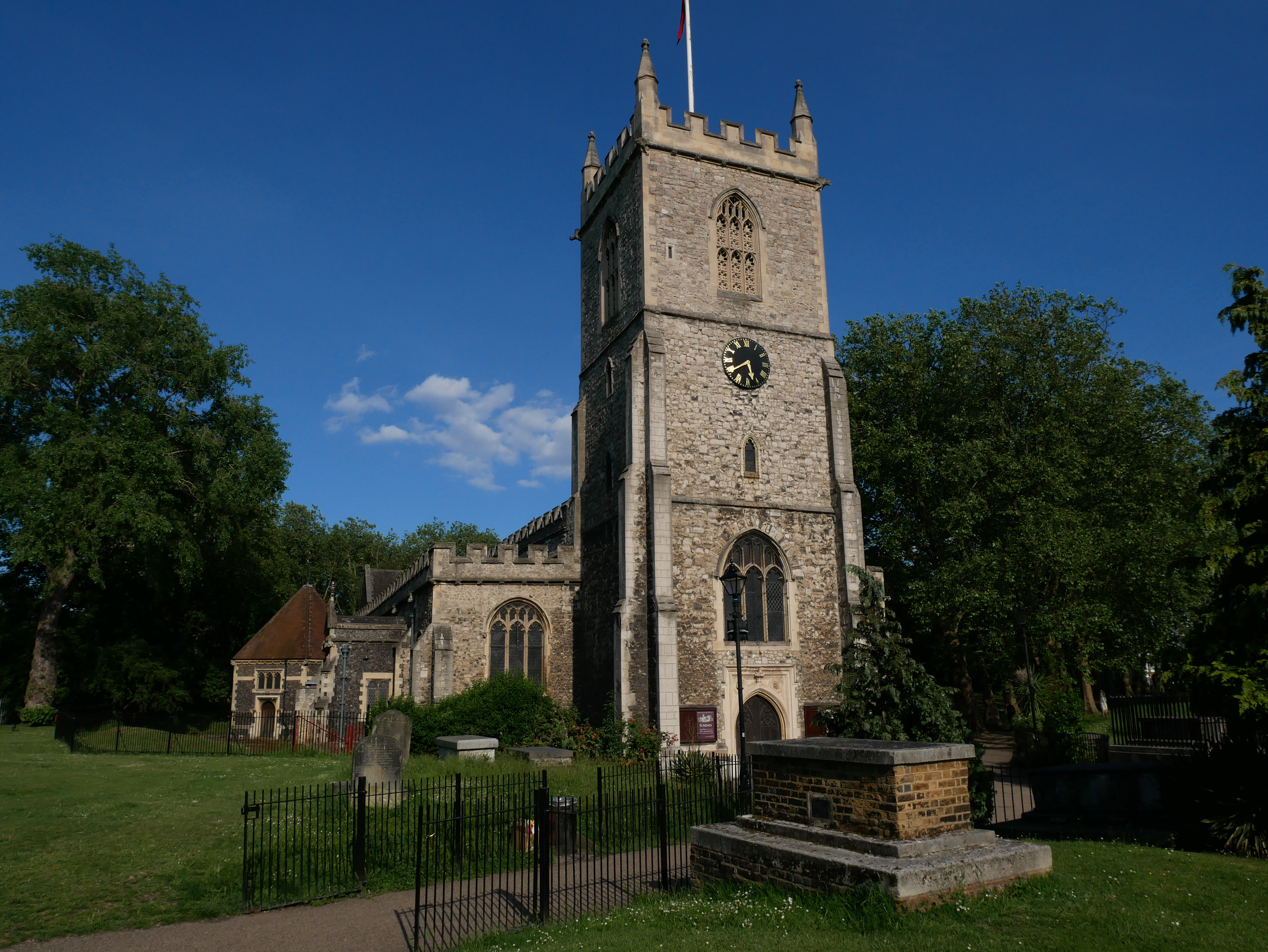
- St Dunstan and All Saints, Stepney
- 51°31′1″N 0°2′30″W
- Denomination: Church of England
- Churchmanship: Modern Inclusive Anglo Catholic
- Website: Official website of St Dunstan's

History
- Dedication: St Dunstan and All Saints

Architecture
- Heritage designation: Grade I

Administration
- Province: Canterbury
- Diocese: Diocese of London
- Archdeaconry: Hackney
- Deanery: Tower Hamlets
- Parish: Stepney

Clergy
- Rector: The Rev'd Trevor Critchlow
- Vicar: The Rev'd Tasha Critchlow

St Dunstan's, Stepney, is an Anglican church located in Stepney High Street, Stepney, in the London Borough of Tower Hamlets. The church is believed to have been founded, or re-founded, in AD 952 by St Dunstan, the patron saint of bell ringers, metalworkers and Stepney.

The church is also known as the Mother Church of the East End, and the Church of the High Seas.

== History ==
In about AD 952, Dunstan, the Bishop of London—who was also Lord of the manor of Stepney—replaced the existing wooden structure with a new church (probably including stone elements) dedicated to All the Saints. In 1029, when Dunstan was canonised, the church was rededicated to St Dunstan and All Saints, a dedication it has retained. Like many subsequent Bishops, Dunstan may have lived in the Manor of Stepney, perhaps at the Bishops Wood residence. Dunstan is the patron saint of bellringers, bellfounders, metalworkers, musicians and Stepney, and his feast day is May 19. In both the Anglican and Catholic traditions, the liturgical colour for St Dunstan's Day (in common with other non-martyred saints) is white. This means that the church is decorated with white hangings and the clergy wear white vestments.

Dunstan is likely to have had a very 'hands on' approach to building the church. There are so many legends regarding Dunstan, such as those relating to iron in folklore, that some historic accounts are disregarded as ahistorical or more pious, such as those describing Dunstan physically moving a whole church so that it better aligns with the traditional East-West axis (cf. Mark 11:23).

Dunstan is recorded as doing this at Mayfield in the East Sussex Weald, and there is every chance he did similar at Stepney. This is entirely plausible as 10th century churches were typically formed from a small lightweight timber frame that was placed in a pre-dug trench. It is realistic that Dunstan, especially if aided by local builders, adjusted the alignment of the church structure within the trenches with his shoulder. Once the structure was correctly aligned, the trench could be filled in and the gaps in the timber framework filled with wattle and daub. As the local bishop, it would also have been Dunstan who consecrated the church.

The church is known as "The Mother Church of the East End" as the parish covered most of what would become inner East London, before population growth led to the creation of a large number of daughter parishes. For this reason, the symbol of St Dunstan, his blacksmith tongs, are included in the London Borough of Tower Hamlets coat of arms.

The first daughter-parish is believed to be Hackney as it was part of the Manor of Stepney, but it became an independent parish very early and no records survive. Whitechapel followed in the fourteenth century and others followed. Some parish churches, such as Bow Church in Bow began as a chapel of ease within Stepney, before becoming the heart of new independent parishes.

Stepney’s close historic links to seaborne trade have led to the church being known as the Church of the High Seas. The registration of births at sea was the responsibility of the Bishop of London, with the recording carried out at in Stepney, at St Dunstan’s. This appears to be the origin of the tradition that British warships are part of the Parish of Stepney, and that children born at sea are Stepney parishioners as recounted on the old rhyme: "He who sails on the wide sea, is a parishioner of Stepney."

The existing building is the third on the site and was built of Kentish ragstone mainly in the fifteenth century (although the chancel dates from 200 years earlier). A porch and octagonal parish room were added in 1872 by Arthur Shean Newman and Arthur Billing. The church was restored extensively in 1899 by Cutts and Cutts, at a cost of £5,600. The vestries and some of the main building were destroyed by fire on 12 October 1901, including the organ which had carvings by Grinling Gibbons. The restoration (again by Cutts and Cutts) cost £7,084, and the church was re-opened in June 1902 by the Bishop of Stepney (at that time Cosmo Gordon Lang).

Although the area around the church was devastated by air raids, the church building suffered relatively minor damage, occurring when a V2 ballistic missile landed in the north-west part of the churchyard in January 1945 damaging the tower and destroying stained glass windows. The church was restored by Cyril Wontner-Smith. The church is Grade I listed.

The destruction of the surrounding district was so great that in the mid 1950s, London County Council proposed that the churchyard form the focus of a much larger new park to provide recreational opportunities to local people. It ultimately shelved the scheme in 1969.

=== Bells ===
As befitting a church dedicated to the patron saint of bell ringers and bellfounders, a ring of ten bells, tuned to C#, hangs in the belfry. St Dunstan, is recorded as experimenting with casting bells in his own foundry. The Stepney bells were cast at the local Whitechapel Bell Foundry founded in 1570. Until its closure in 2017, the foundry was the last major survivor of an East End metalworking heritage going back to at least the 1300s, and whose largest expression was the nearby Thames Ironworks at Blackwall and Canning Town.

Of the ten, the seven oldest bells of these were cast in 1806. The bells were re-hung in 1899. The heaviest bell weighs 28¾ hundredweight. Three were recast in 1952 when repairs were made to the tower. The bells are mentioned in the nursery rhyme Oranges and Lemons: "When will that be, say the bells of Stepney." This is a reference to the cries of sailors and dockworkers for their wage. Their employers often cheated them of payment.

The 6th bell has an inscription dedicating it to Prisca Coborn, who in 1701 set up a charity for widows of Stepney sailors. The 9th bell is dedicated to Sir Charles Wager, patron of the Stepney Society which held the annual Cockney's Feast, also known as the Stepney Feast. The annual tradition was a charitable event to raise money to allow Stepney boys to be apprenticed as seamen, or to work in other maritime trades.

=== Interior ===
A fine triple sedilia (priests' stone seating) is found in the chancel. The rood is late Anglo Saxon. Of note amongst the plate is a cup and paten dated 1559 and a beadle's staff and verger's wand of 1752.

The organ was installed in 1971 by Noel Mander of Mander Organs. It is an 1872 Father Willis instrument built for St Augustine's, Haggerston, and rebuilt by R. Spurden Rutt & Co in 1926. It replaced a 1903 Norman and Beard organ, which is now located at St Edmund the King, Northwood Hills. In turn, that organ replaced the one destroyed in the 1901 fire, which was from 1678 and built by Renatus Harris, and had been rebuilt by Lewis & Co in 1900.

=== Churchyard ===
The church is surrounded by a churchyard of nearly seven acres (28,000 m^{2}). Around 1665, the churchyard was enlarged to cope with the massive number of deaths during the Great Plague of London. In one eighteen-month period 6,583 died, with 154 being buried in one day in September 1665.

The church has a long, traditional link with the sea and many sailors were buried here. It is known as the 'Church of the High Seas'. The graveyard is also where Roger Crab, the 17th-century hermit who lived on a diet solely of herbs, roots, leaves, grass and water, is buried.

The churchyard closed to burials in 1854. Between 1885 and 1887 high ground around the church was dug away, and the Metropolitan Public Gardens Association (MPGA) converted it to a public garden, designed by the MPGA's landscape gardener Fanny Wilkinson. The MPGA bore the cost of conversion at £3,000. The garden was opened by the Duchess of Leeds in 1887.

The railings, piers and gates to the churchyard are Grade II listed; the war memorial in the churchyard is also separately Grade II listed.

The grounds include many specimens of London plane and a black mulberry tree. Once much more widespread, mulberry trees are a legacy of the weaving trade that was so important to the area, and are still found in many East End churchyards.

=== Current activities ===
The church continues to be open to visitors and worshippers from all over the world. There is an active congregation who help to continue the life of the church community. As well as the Arbour Centre (a St Dunstan's community project) and the food bank, there is a close connection with two schools: Stepney Greencoat Church of England Primary School and Stepney All Saints School. St Dunstan's also employs a Children and Community Worker funded by the Bishop of London's Mission Fund.

== Notable people ==
=== Clergy ===
- John Colet (1467–1519), educational pioneer and leading Christian humanist.
- Richard Foxe (1448–1528), subsequently a bishop and founder of Corpus Christi College, Oxford.
- William Greenhill (1591–1671), nonconformist clergyman, independent minister, and member of the Westminster Assembly. He was appointed vicar whilst retaining his position as a preacher at Stepney Meeting House. He held this post for about seven years, till he was ejected after Restoration in 1660.
- Matthew Mead (1630–1699).

=== Baptisms ===
- Godscall Paleologue (1694–?) last heir of the Eastern Roman Empire, born in Wapping and baptised at St Dunstan's in 1694.
- Phoebe Hessel (1713–1821), the 'Stepney Amazon', a centenarian who impersonated a man to serve in the British Army.

=== Burials ===
- Roger Crab (1621–1680), promoter of Christian vegetarianism, who lived as a hermit at Bethnal Green.
- Richard Swanley (d. 1650), parliamentarian naval officer.
- Timothy Cruso (1657–1697), clergyman.
- John Leake (1656–1720), naval commander.

== See also ==
- List of churches and cathedrals of London
