= Timothy Cruso =

English Presbyterian minister (1657–1697)

- Pastor at Crutched Friars
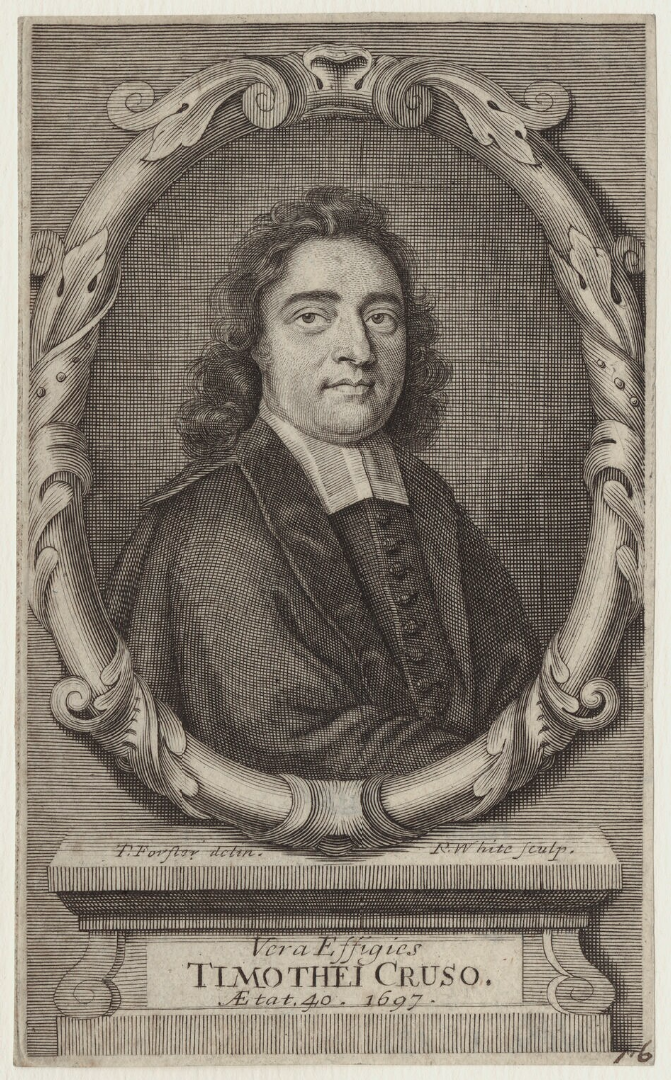
- Timothy Cruso, engraved by Robert White after Thomas Forster (1697)

Personal details
- Born: 27 July 1657 Newington Green, Middlesex
- Died: 26 November 1697 (aged 40)
- Buried: Stepney churchyard
- Denomination: Presbyterian

Timothy Cruso (1657–1697) was an English Presbyterian minister and writer. He studied in the Newington Green Academy; proceeded M.A. at one of the Scotch universities; was pastor at Crutched Friars in 1688; was appointed to the Pinners Hall merchants' lectureship in 1694; and died at an early age in 1697—just eight years before Defoe wrote Robinson Crusoe and immortalised his name. Cruso also published homilies and sermons.

== Life ==
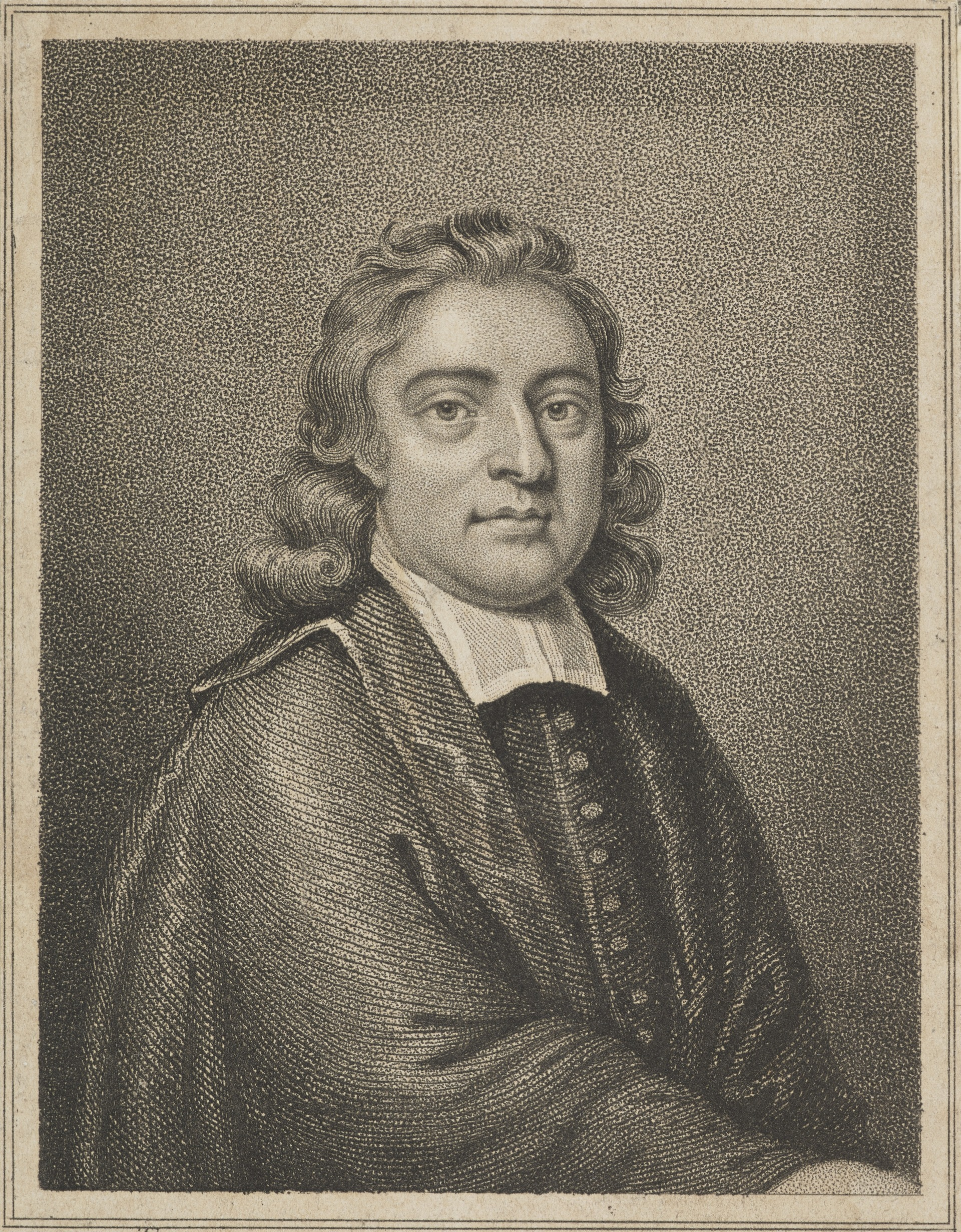
Timothy Cruso, engraved by James Hopwood the Elder after Forster (1808)

Timothy Cruso was born on 27 July 1657, although some sources say he was probably born about the middle of 1656. He was probably the son of Timothy Cruso by his wife, Sarah Hatt. His family resided at Newington Green, Middlesex; he had a brother, Nathaniel. He studied for the ministry in the Newington Green Academy, under Charles Morton, ejected from Blisland, Cornwall, who left England in 1685, and afterwards became vice-president of Harvard University. While at this academy Cruso had as a fellow-student Daniel Defoe, who immortalised his surname by the Adventures published in 1719. After leaving Morton, Cruso graduated M.A. in one of the Scotch universities (not Edinburgh). When a lad of eighteen, designed for the ministry, he was impressed by the dying counsels of Oliver Bowles, B.D. (died 5 September 1674), who advised him never to trouble his hearers "with useless or contending notions, but rather preach all in practicals". He settled in London (before 1688) at Crutched Friars, as pastor of a congregation which from the formation of the Presbyterian fund in 1690 was connected with its board. Having in the estimation of his peers a good voice and graceful manner, in addition to a sound judgment, he soon acquired distinction as a preacher, and secured a large auditory. In 1695 Francis Fuller was his assistant at Crutched Friars. Cruso held aloof from the doctrinal disputes which broke the harmony of the "happy union" between the Presbyterians and Independents in the first year of its existence (1691), and which led to the removal of Daniel Williams, D.D. (in 1694), and the withdrawal of other Presbyterian lecturers, from the Pinners' Hall merchants' lectureship. Cruso was chosen to fill one of the vacancies.

Alexander Gordon writes of Cruso: "His own orthodoxy was solid and unimpeachable, but not restless. It has been hinted that he appreciated the pleasures of the table; if so, it was doubtless in an honest way, like Calamy and other genial divines of the dissenting interest." Matthew Mead, the Independent, says of him: "If I may use the phrase in fashion, he lived too fast, not as too many do who shorten their lives by their debaucheries and sinful excesses, but as a taper which wastes itself to give light to others." He died on 26 November 1697, aged 40. He was buried in Stepney churchyard. He was married, and had issue. The inscription on his portrait (drawn by Thomas Forster, and engraved by Robert White) says, "ætat. 40, 1697." He was said to have had an agreeable countenance, but was of insignificant stature. By a majority of one vote his congregation chose as his successor Thomas Shepherd, afterwards independent minister at Bocking, Essex. The election was overruled, and William Harris, D.D., a Presbyterian, was appointed. A split ensued, and the congregation dwindled till its extinction in 1777. An elegy to Cruso's memory was published in 1697, fol., by J. S. (perhaps John Shower, his fellow-student), who complains of the "barbarous verse" of others who had attempted the same theme.

== Works ==
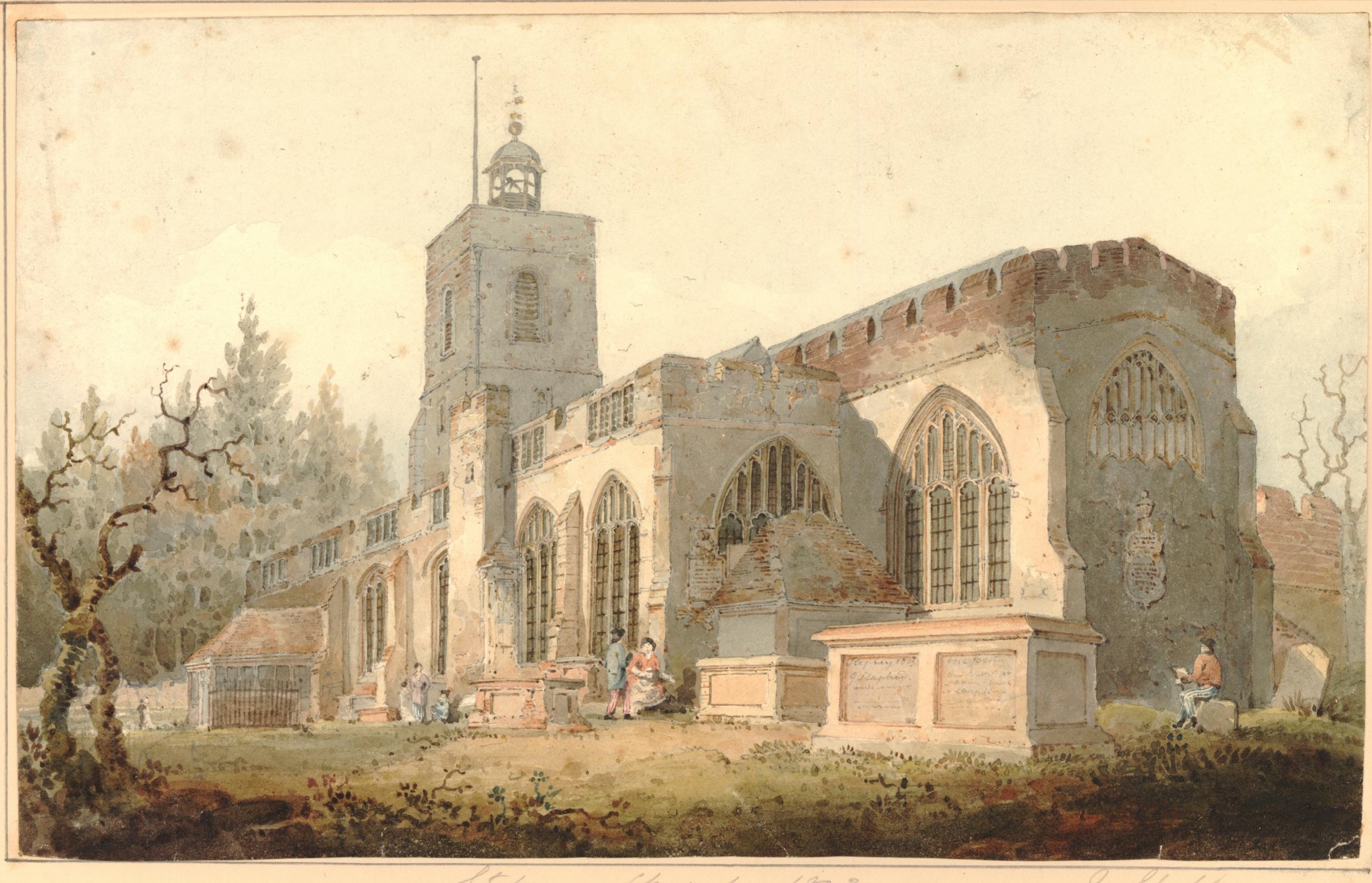
View of St Dunstan's, Stepney by George Shepherd (1803)

He published:

1. The Christian Lover, 1690, 8vo.
2. The Blessedness of a Tender Conscience, 1691, 8vo.
3. God the Guide to Youth, 1695, 8vo.
4. Plea for Attendance at the Lord's Table, 1696, 8vo.
5. Sermons at Pinners' Hall, 1697 8vo, 1698 8vo, 1699 8vo (edited by Matthew Mead).

Also funeral sermons for Mary Smith, 1688, 4to (anonymous), and Henry Brownsword, 1688, 4to; five separate 4to sermons in 1689, all dealing more or less with the revolution of that year; and a sermon on An Early Victory over Satan, 1693, 4to. Some of his publications, bearing only the initial of his Christian name, have often been catalogued under "Thomas" Cruso. Samuel Palmer, of the Nonconformist's Memorial, had the manuscripts of some of Cruso's Pinners' Hall lectures. His sermons on the rich man and Lazarus, "preached at Pinners' Hall in 1690" (sic; but the true date is 1696), were reprinted at Edinburgh in 1798, 12mo, with preface by Robert Culbertson of Leith.

== Sources ==
- Mercer, M. J. (2004). "Cruso, Timothy (bap. 1657, d. 1697), Presbyterian minister". Oxford Dictionary of National Biography (online ed.). Oxford University Press. doi:10.1093/ref:odnb/6853. (Subscription, Wikipedia Library access or UK public library membership required.)

Attribution:

- This article incorporates text from a publication now in the public domain: Gordon, Alexander (1888). "Cruso, Timothy". In Stephen, Leslie (ed.). Dictionary of National Biography. Vol. 13. London: Smith, Elder & Co. pp. 264–265.
