= James Edwin Forbes =

English architect (1876–1955)

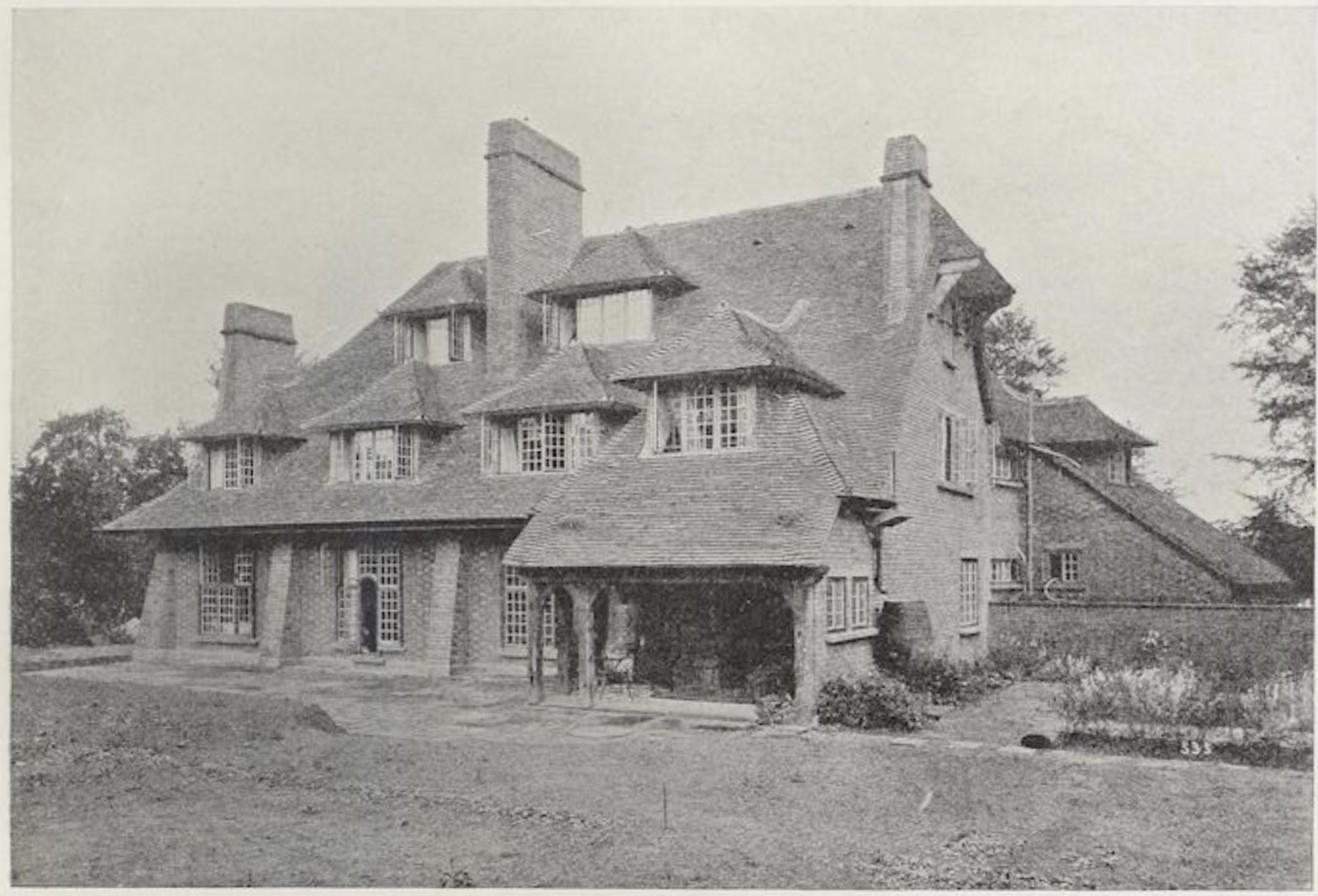
The Sheiling, Chalfont St Giles, the house that Forbes built for himself

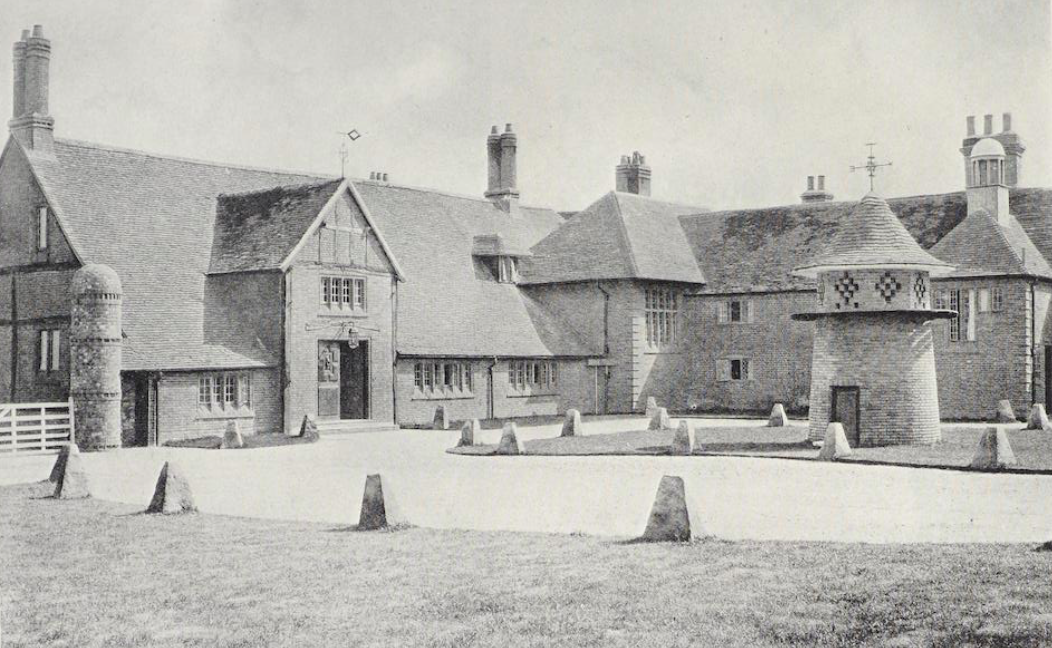
Little Pednor

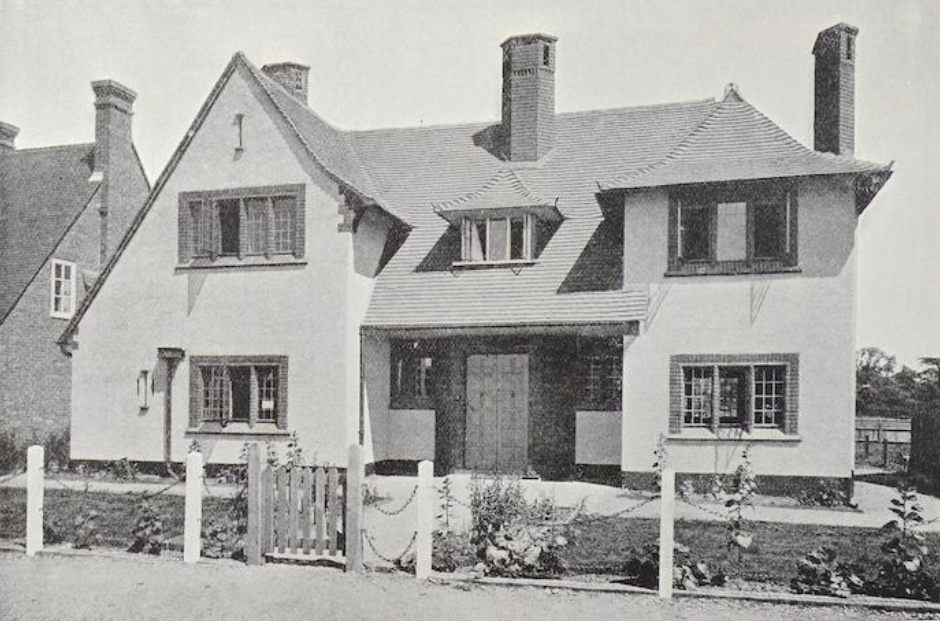
40 Parkway, Gidea Park, Romford

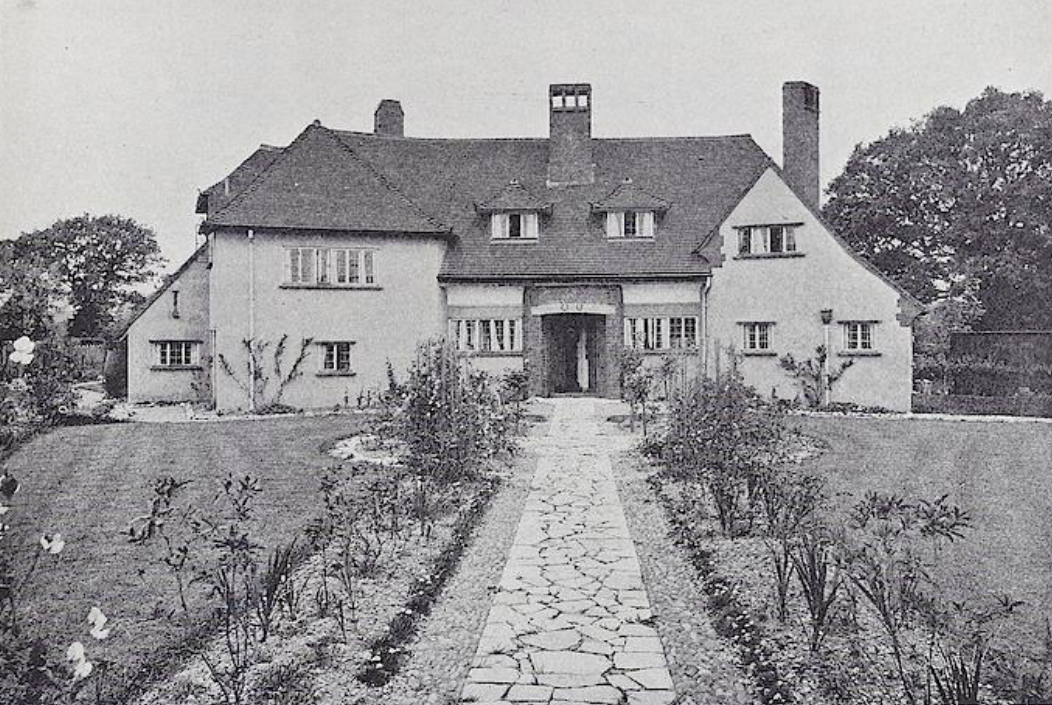
Brantfell, Gerrards Cross

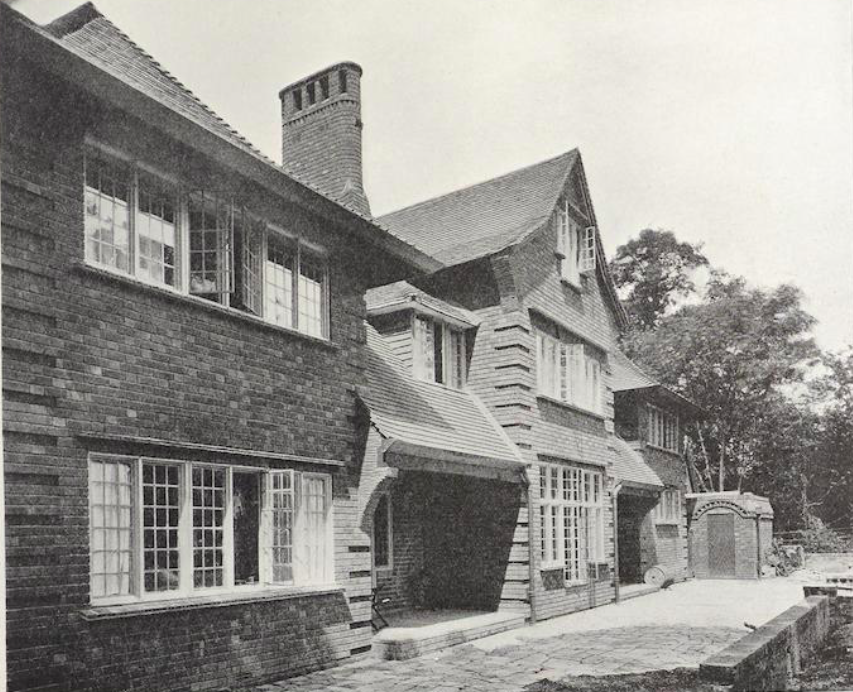
The Pillars, Northwood

James Edwin Forbes FRIBA (1876 - 1955) was an architect primarily based in London from 1905 to 1930 in partnership with John Duncan Tate.

== Architectural career ==
He was articled to George Washington Browne (1853-1939) from 1892 to 1896, and then was assistant to Robert Rowand Anderson. He studied at the Edinburgh School of Applied Art and in 1899 became assistant to Edward William Mountford in London until 1901 when he won the Grissell Medal.

In 1901 he commenced a practice in Colmore House, 21 Waterloo Street, Birmingham where his assistant was John Duncan Tate. In 1903 he won second prize of £200 in the competition for designs for the new University building proposed to be erected in Cape Town for the Cape of Good Hope University.

In 1905 he formed a partnership with Tate at 38 Great James Street on Bedford Road in London. This partnership became prolific in its output of domestic houses in the arts and crafts style, mainly in the Home Counties.

He was admitted as LRIBA in 1910 and FRIBA in 1916.

== Personal life ==
He was born in 1876 in Edinburgh, the son of Revd. William George Forbes (1838-1884) and Janet Tod (1848-1908)

He married Gwendolen Evans (1878-1941) daughter of the late Dr George Harrison Evans FRCS and Mrs Agnes Louisa Chance on 1 January 1904 in St Bartholomew's Church, Edgbaston and they had three sons:

- Ian Forbes (1905-1969) (also an architect)
- Douglas McWhirter (Mcquerter) Forbes (1907-1979)
- Norman Forbes (1913-1982)

After the death of his first wife, he married Barbara Gordon Hollingsworth (1914-1971) in Amersham in 1942. They had one daughter

- Sarah Forbes

He died on 22 April 1955 at the Old Ship Inn, Brighton, and left an estate valued at £2,684 11s 5d. (equivalent to £58,400 in 2023).

== Works ==
- Pollard's Wood House, Nightingale Lane, Chalfont St Giles 1906
- The Sheiling, Chalfont St Giles 1907 (built as his own house)
- The Pollards, Oval Way, Gerrards Cross
- Brown Cottage, Oval Way, Gerrards Cross
- Kimberley, Oval Way, Gerrards Cross
- Pollards Park, Chalfont St Giles for Archibald Grove MP 1907
- Pollards Wood Grange, Buckinghamshire ca. 1909
- Little Pednor, Chartridge, 1910-12 (enlarged)
- Brantfell, Gerrards Cross, ca. 1911
- House at 40 Parkway, Gidea Park, Romford, ca. 1911
- The Pillars, Northwood, London ca. 1911
- Widenham House, West Common, Gerrards Cross
- Paddock House, West Common, Gerrard's Cross. ca 1913
- Baylins Farmhouse, Penn Road, Knotty Green 1919 (loggia addition)
- War Memorial Hall, Ballinger, Buckinghamshire 1922
- Barrington Court, Somerset 1921-25 (restoration)
- Beechams, Barrington Court, Somerset 1921-25
- House, 8 Upper Grosvenor Street, London 1927-28 (remodelled, with front elevation by Lutyens)
- House for J. Crook, Chalfont Road, Amersham 1928
