= Friedrich Filitz =

German composer and musicologist

- Born: 16 March 1804; Arnstadt
- Died: 8 December 1876 (aged 72); Bonn
- Occupations: Composer; Musicologist

Friedrich Filitz (16 March 1804 – 8 December 1876) was a German composer and musicologist who collected church music from the 16th and 17th centuries.

== Biography ==
Filitz was born in Arnstadt, County of Schwarzburg-Rudolstadt, in 1804. He received a PhD and lived in Berlin from 1833, working as a music critic among other employment. In 1841, Filitz was shortlisted to be a censor of the Prussian state, although there were concerns he would be too strict. He moved to Munich in 1847, where his legacy of valuable church music is now in the Bavarian State Library. Through his collections of church music from the 16th and 17th, he made many forgotten works available once again.

One of his tunes, Mannheim, is one to which the hymn Lead us, heavenly Father, lead us, with words by English architect and hymn writer James Edmeston, has been set.

== Works ==
- Vierstimmiges Choralbuch herausgegeben von Dr F Filitz. Besser, Berlin 1847. OCLC 162924467.
- Ueber einige Interessen der älteren Kirchenmusik. Kaiser, München 1853. OCLC 49441415.

== Bibliography ==
- Frost, Maurice (1962). Historical Companion to Hymns Ancient & Modern. London: William Clowes & Sons Limited. p. 670. OCLC 470550291.
- Holtz, Bärbel (2015). Preußens Zensurpraxis von 1819 bis 1848 in Quellen [Prussian censorship practice from 1819 to 1848 in sources]. Acta Borussica, Neue Folge: 2. Reihe, Preußen als Kulturstaat; Abteilung II, Der preußische Kulturstaat in der politischen und sozialen Wirklichkeit; Band 6. Berlin, Boston: De Gruyter. p. 670. ISBN 9783110409130. OCLC 470550291.
