= Pednor House =

Coordinates: 51.7155°N 0.6619°W

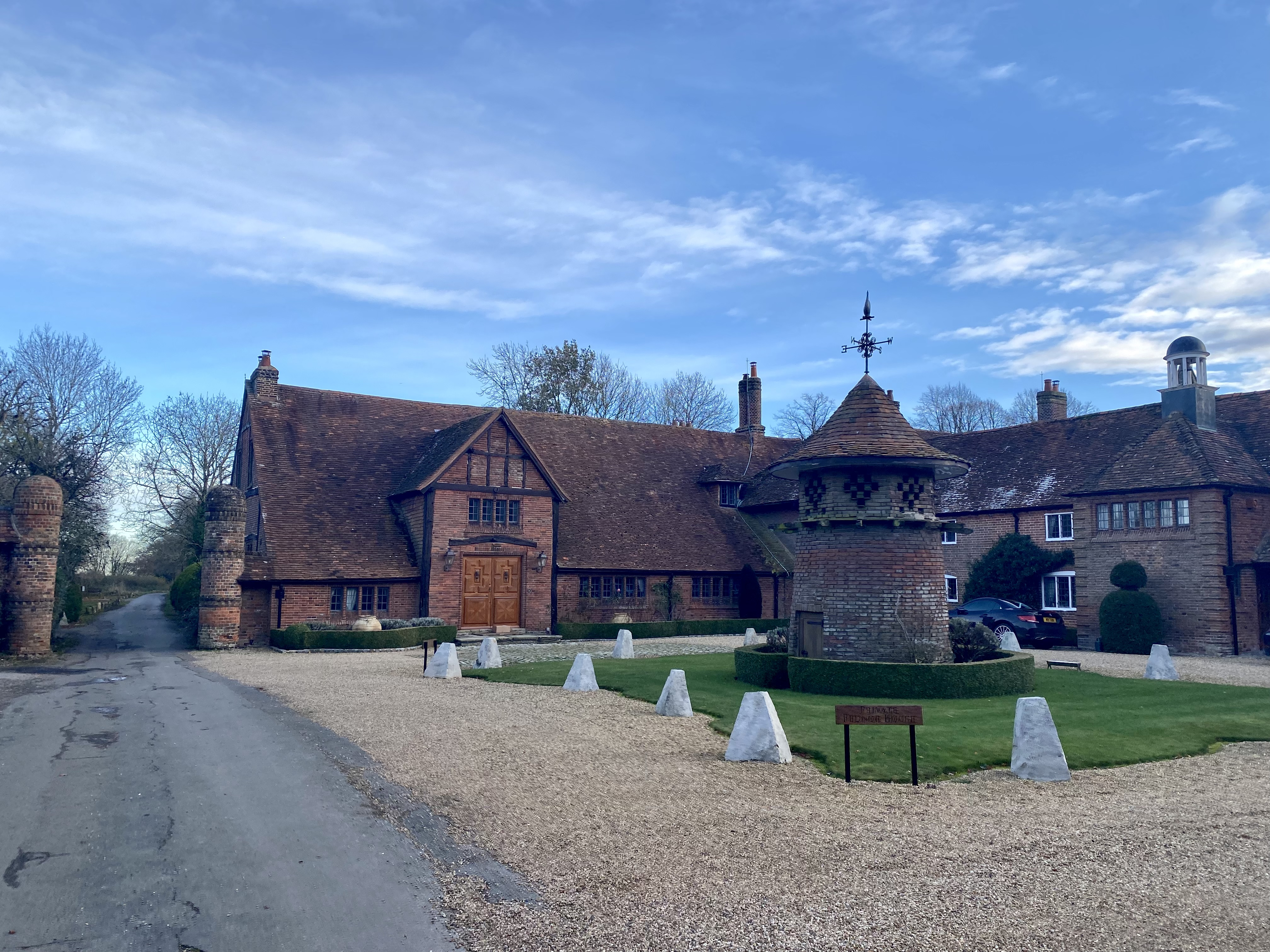
Pednor House in May 2020

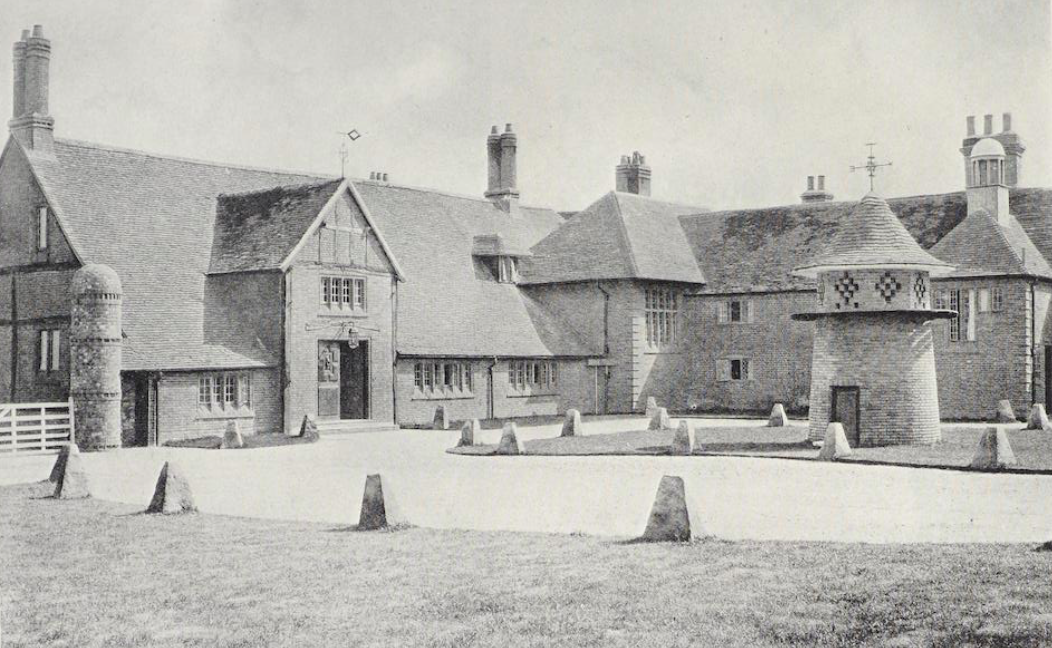
From The Studio Yearbook of Decorative Art 1913

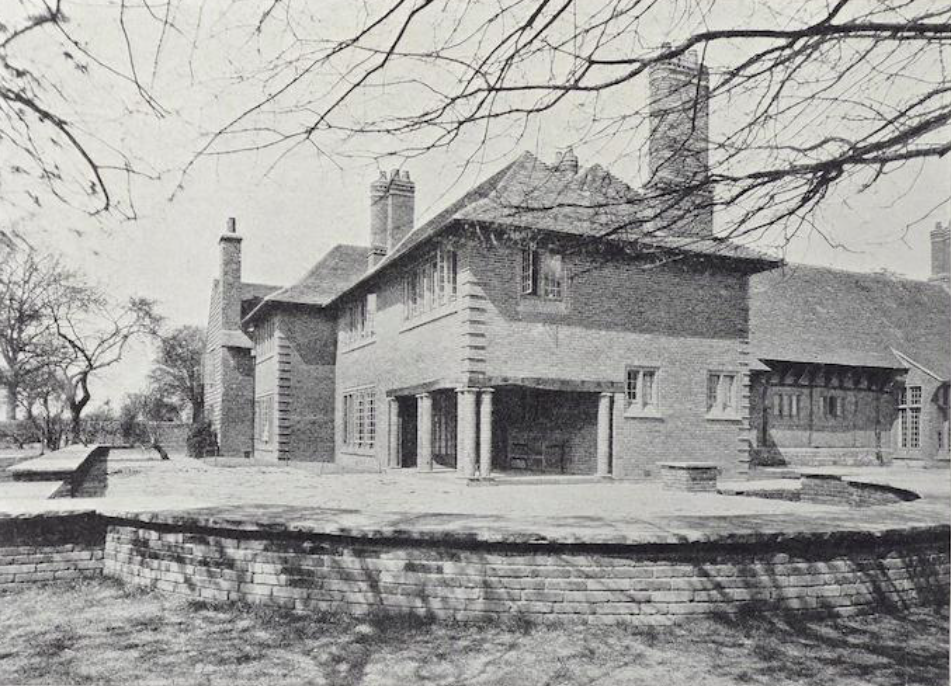
From The Studio Yearbook of Decorative Art 1913

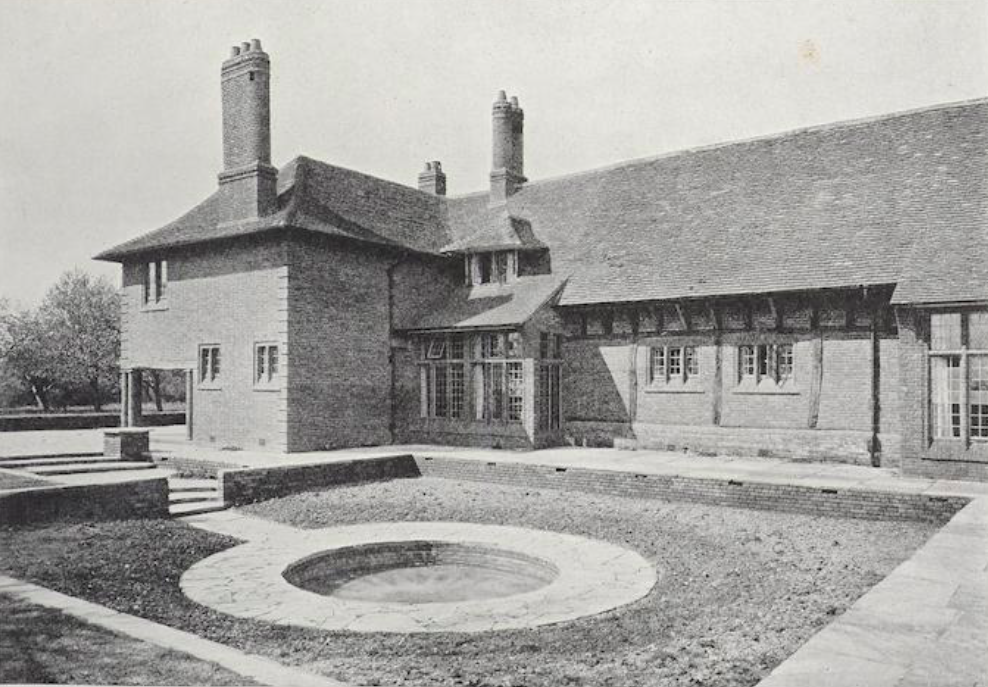
From The Studio Yearbook of Decorative Art 1913

Pednor House (formerly known as Little Pednor) is a house near Chartridge parish of Buckinghamshire. It has been listed Grade II on the National Heritage List for England since November 1983.

The original 17th century timber-framed house was enlarged in 1910 under the architects James Edwin Forbes and John Duncan Tate (as Forbes and Tate) in the Arts and Crafts style. Originally a farmhouse, the barns and outbuildings were converted into a single large residence. Forbes and Tate specialised in converting old buildings into houses, the Buckinghamshire edition of the Pevsner Architectural Guides describes Pednor House as their "most extensive and successful conversion" that created a "picturesque Tudor courtyard house" Forbes and Tate commissioned Gertrude Jekyll for a garden planting plan around the sundial at Pednor House. In his 2000 book The Gardens of Gertrude Jekyll, Richard Bisgrove described Jekyll's detailed plan for Pednor House as creating planting in "carefully disposed in repeated and irregular groups to provide a low mosaic of flowers and foliage throughout the year".

A cylindrical brick dovecote is situated by the front gate.

Pednor House was photographed by Edwin Smith in 1930. Smith's photographs of Pednor House are in the collection of the British Architectural Library.

The house was owned by the British Army officer and former Governor of the Bahamas Daniel Knox, 6th Earl of Ranfurly, for several years and was put up for sale by him in 1963 through Knight, Frank and Rutley.
