= James Edmeston =

Architect, surveyor, hymn writer

James Edmeston (10 September 1791 – 7 January 1867) was an English architect and surveyor; he was also known as a prolific writer of church hymns.

He was born in Wapping, Middlesex, England. His maternal grandfather was the Reverend Samuel Brewer, congregationalist pastor at Stepney Meeting House for 50 years. However, James was attracted to the Church of England and soon became an Anglican.

== Architectural work ==
Edmeston began as an architect in 1816. He designed several structures in London, including drinking fountains, the Uzielli memorial in Highgate Cemetery and the church of St Paul's, Onslow Square. George Gilbert Scott was his pupil, articled to Edmeston in 1827. In 1864 he built Columbia Wharf, Rotherhithe, the first grain silo in a British port.

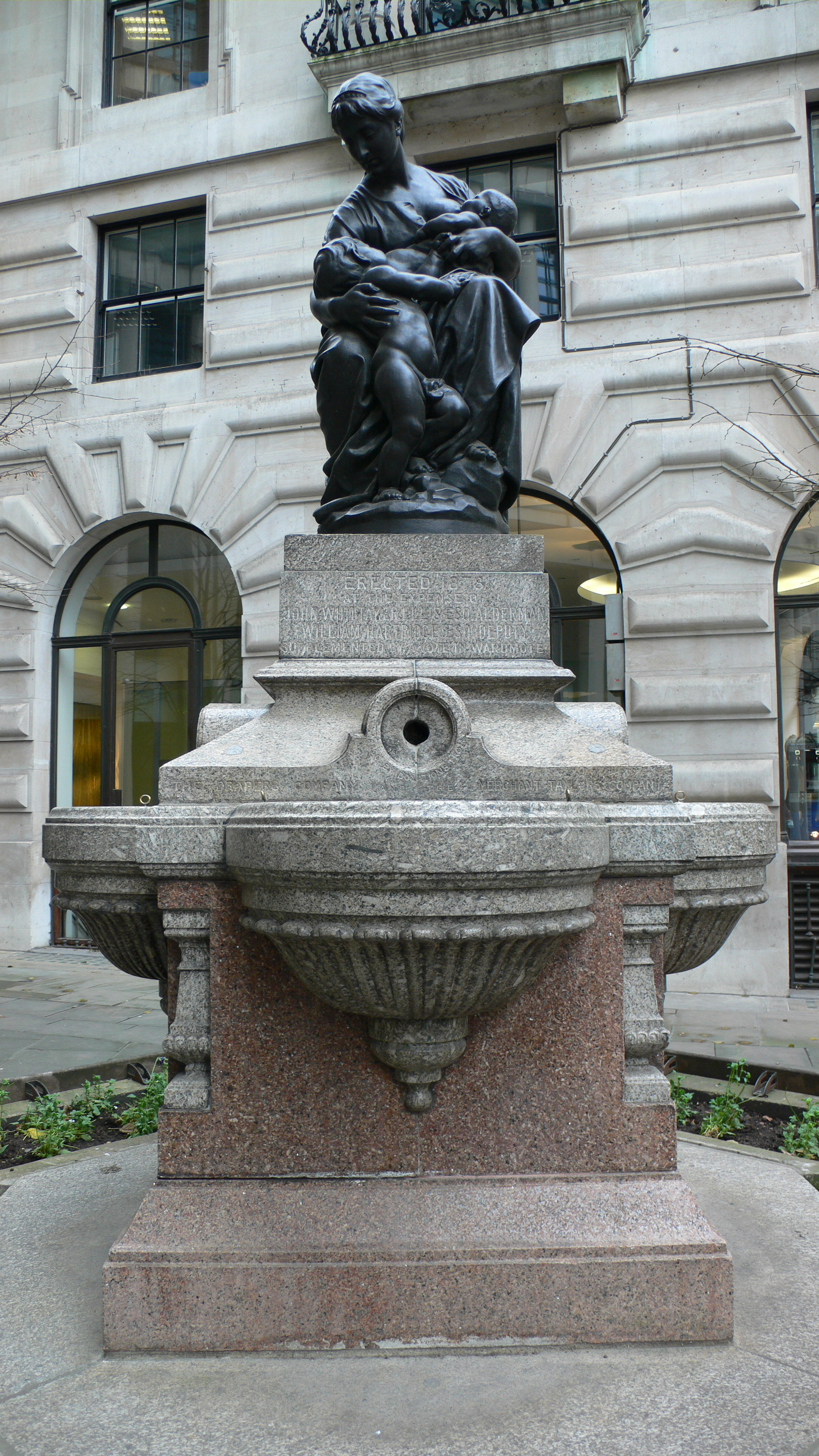
"Charity" sculpture by Jules Dalou, incorporated into a drinking fountain by James Edmeston, behind the Royal Exchange, London

== Literary work ==
Edmeston started by writing poetry publishing The Search, and other Poems in 1817.

== Ecclesiastical and charity career ==
He served as the church warden at St. Barnabas in Homerton, Middlesex, and was a strong supporter of and frequent visitor to the London Orphan Asylum. Edmeston is said to have written 2000 hymns, one every Sunday. His best-known hymn is the popular wedding hymn 'Lead us, Heavenly Father, lead us / O'er the world's tempestuous sea'. The hymn has been set to several tunes, one of which, Mannheim, is by German composer Friedrich Filitz.

He died in Homerton in 1867.
