= Frank Fuller =

Frank Fuller may refer to:

- Frank Fuller (American football) (1929–1993), American football defensive tackle
- Frank Fuller (baseball) (1893–1965), backup infielder in Major League Baseball

== See also ==
- Francis Fuller (disambiguation)
