= William Greenhill =

English nonconformist clergyman

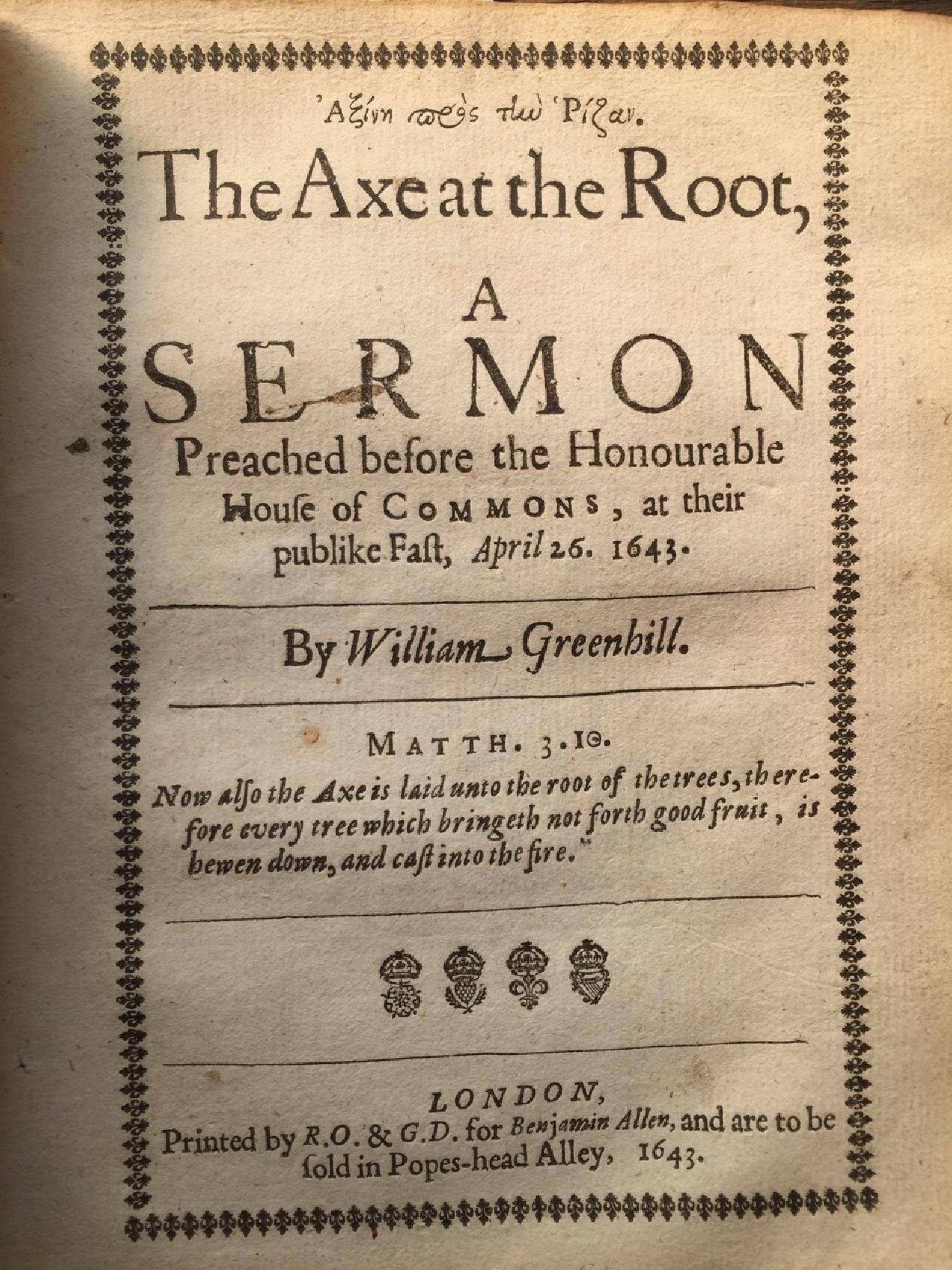

William Greenhill (1591 – 27 September 1671) was an English nonconformist clergyman, independent minister, and member of the Westminster Assembly.

== Life ==
He was born probably in Oxfordshire. At the age of thirteen he matriculated at the University of Oxford on 8 June 1604 and was elected a demy of Magdalen College, Oxford, on 8 January 1605. He graduated B.A. on 25 January 1609, and M.A. on 9 July 1612, in which year he resigned his demyship.

From 1615 to 1633 William Greenhill held the Magdalen College living of New Shoreham, Sussex. He appears to have officiated in some ministerial capacity in the diocese of Norwich, when Matthew Wren was bishop; he got into trouble for refusing to read The Book of Sports. He then moved to London, and was chosen afternoon preacher to the congregation at Stepney, while Jeremiah Burroughes ministered in the morning.

He was a member of the Westminster Assembly of Divines, convened in 1643, and was one of the Independents. In the same year, on 26 April, he preached before the House of Commons of England on occasion of a public fast, and his sermon was published by command of the house, with the title The Axe at the Root. In 1644 he was present at the formation of Stepney Meeting House, the congregational church in Stepney, and was appointed first pastor. For a time he shared preaching duties with Jeremy Burroughs and Matthew Mead.

In 1649, after the death of Charles, he was appointed by the parliament chaplain to three of the late king Charles's children: James, Duke of York (afterwards James II); Henry, Duke of Gloucester; and the Lady Henrietta Anne.

In 1654 he was appointed by Oliver Cromwell one of the 'commissioners for approbation of public preachers,' known as 'triers.' In 1658 he was on the committee drawing up the Savoy Declaration. It was also probably by Cromwell that he was appointed vicar of St. Dunstan and All Saints, the old parish church of Stepney, while he continued pastor of the independent church. This post he held for about seven years.

He was ejected immediately after the Restoration in 1660, but he retained the pastorate of the independent church.

Shortly after Greenhill’s death, Matthew Mead was called to succeed him as pastor, and he was ordained on 14 December 1671 by Joseph Caryl, John Owen and two others.

== Works ==
His chief work is his Exposition of the Prophet Ezekiel, a full commentary. It was published in five volumes between 1645 and 1662. The last volume is said to be scarce, and it is supposed that many copies were destroyed in the Great Fire of London of 1666. The first volume is dedicated to the Princess Elizabeth, second daughter to Charles I, then nine years old. He calls her 'the excellent princess and most hopeful lady.' The connection may have been through his friend Henry Burton, acquainted with the royal family. The whole work was reprinted (with some omissions and alterations) in 1837-9. Greenhill also published (besides editing books by several of his friends) two volumes of sermons, one called Sermons of Christ, His Discovery of Himself, &c., 1656; the other called The Sound-hearted Christian, &c., by W. G., 1670 (in some copies 1671).
