= Timothy Rogers =

Timothy Rogers (1658–1728) was an English nonconformist minister. He was also known as an author on depression which he himself suffered from.

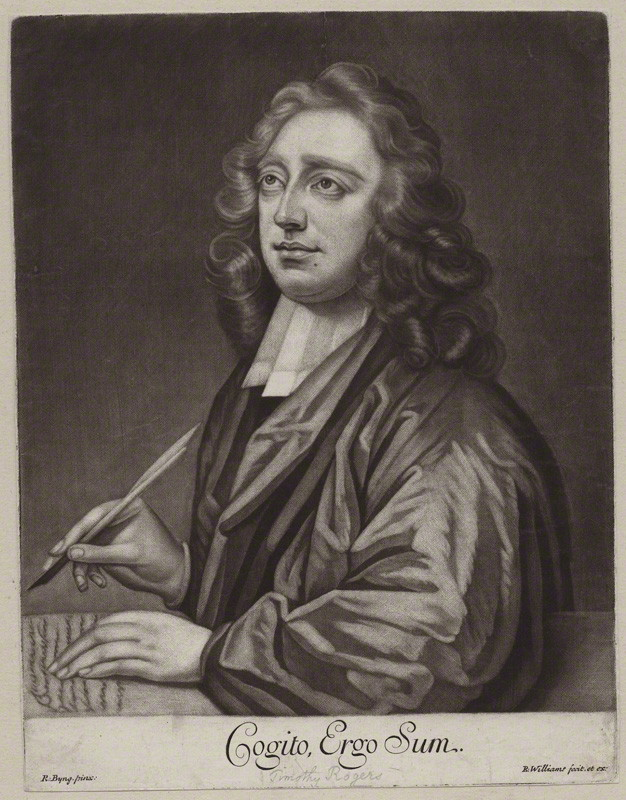
Timothy Rogers

== Life ==
The son of John Rogers (1610–1680), he was born at Barnard Castle, County Durham on 24 May 1658. He was educated at Glasgow University, where he matriculated in 1673, and then studied under Edward Veal at Wapping.

Rogers began his career in the dissenting ministry as evening lecturer at Crosby Square, Bishopsgate. Some time after 1682 he was struck down by a form of hypochondria, from which he recovered in 1690. This experience led to his writing Practical Discourses on Sickness and Recovery, 1690. He then became assistant to John Shower. Shower was then minister of the Presbyterian congregation in Jewin Street, and moved in 1701 to the Old Jewry Meeting-house. Rogers's hypochondria returned, and in 1707 he left the ministry.

William Ashhurst and Thomas Lane, two London Whig politicians, helped Rogers in his condition, now identified as a form of clinical depression, and the Old Jewry congregation gave him a pension.

Retiring to Wantage, Berkshire, Rogers died there in November 1728; he was buried in the churchyard on 29 November.

== Works ==
Rogers published:

- Early religion, or, The way for a young man to remember his Creator, 1683 (with Edward Veel)
- Practical Discourses on Sickness and Recovery, 1690
- A Discourse concerning ... the Disease of Melancholy; in three parts, 1691; 2nd ed. 1706; 3rd ed. 1808, (with life by Walter Wilson).
- The Character of a Good Woman, Both in a Single and Married State, 1697
- A Sermon preach'd to the Societies for Reformation of Manners, 1701

Rogers wrote a preface to the Works of Thomas Gouge the younger (1665?–1700). He gave funeral sermons for Robert Linager (1682), Anthony Dunswell (1692), Edmund Hill (1692), Edward Rede (1694), M. Hasselborn (1696), and Elizabeth Dunton (1697).

=== The Character of a Good Woman (1697) ===
Rogers' The Character of a Good Woman, Both in a Single and Married State (1697) is an example of the handbook genre that was popular in late 17th-century England. Unlike earlier works which identified modesty, humility and honesty as the antidote to women's perceived natural deficiencies, Rogers describes these as inherent qualities in women which can be cultivated in order to mitigate the vanity instilled by social life. Rather than characterising women as more prone to corruption, or in more need of salvation than men, The Character of a Good Woman describes woman as "generally more serious than men ... [and] as far beyond in the lessons Devotion as in the tuneableness and sweetness of your voice."

== Family ==
John Rogers, his grandson, was minister at Poole, Dorset.

== Notes ==
Attribution

This article incorporates text from a publication now in the public domain: Lee, Sidney, ed. (1897). "Rogers, Timothy (1658-1728)". Dictionary of National Biography. Vol. 49. London: Smith, Elder & Co.
