= Simon Browne =

Dissenting minister and theologian

Simon Browne (1680–1732) was a dissenting minister and theologian. He was born in Shepton Mallet, Somerset, England, in 1680.

== Early life ==
Browne was preaching by the age of 20, and first became a minister at an independent church in Portsmouth before moving, in 1716, to preach at the Old Jewry meeting-house in London.

He had a volume of sermons published in 1722, and also a collection entitled Hymns and Spiritual Songs, which included "Come, Holy Spirit, Heavenly Dove" and "And Now, My Soul, Another Year".

== Self-blame ==
Browne was attacked by a highway robber in the early 1720s, and killed him in self-defence. Although he faced no legal consequences for this act, Browne was convinced that he had used excessive force, and had thus become a murderer. He developed the belief, that due to his act of murder, he had become eternally damned, and that his soul had been removed from his body.

This belief has some similarities to the Cotard delusion (although at the distance of some centuries, a definitive diagnosis is impossible).

== Writings ==
Browne abandoned the ministry in late 1723 due to the sudden depression brought on by the highway robbery, and returned to Shepton Mallet.

There he continued to write, including books for children, translations of Latin and Greek poetry, and an abstract of the Bible. He also published three theological works: A Fit Rebuke to a Ludicrous Infidel, A Defence of the Religion of Nature and the Christian Revelation, and A Sober and Charitable Disquisition Concerning The Importance of the Doctrine of the Trinity. He also penned "1 Corinthians" in Matthews Henry's commentary as listed in the preface to volume 6.

== Death ==
Simon Browne died in Shepton Mallet in 1732 and was buried in the meeting-house there.
