= Samuel Brewer (dissenter) =

English dissenting clergyman (1724–1796)

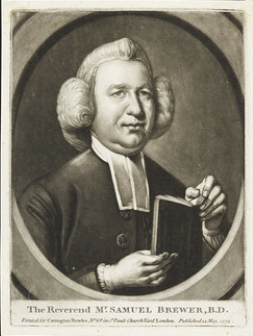
Samuel Brewer in 1774

Samuel Brewer (1724 – 11 June, 1796) was an English dissenting clergyman who was minister at the Stepney Meeting House, London, from 1746 to 1796. He succeeded John Hubbard.

== Life ==
When Brewer took over Stepney Meeting House, the congregation was quite small, but over the years he built it up. He was not sectarian maintaining friendly relations with Anglicans from the established church.

He was particularly friends with George Whitefield, and also very supportive to Samson Occom and Nathaniel Whitaker during their visit to London to raise money for a Christian church in New Hampshire in British Colonial America.

George Ford provided his funeral oration.

His grandson was the hymnist James Edmeston.
