= Frances Fuller (disambiguation) =

Frances Fuller was an American actress.

Frances Fuller may also refer to:

- Frances Fuller (writer), American historian and novelist

== See also ==
- Francis Fuller (disambiguation)
