= Matthew Mead (minister) =

English minister

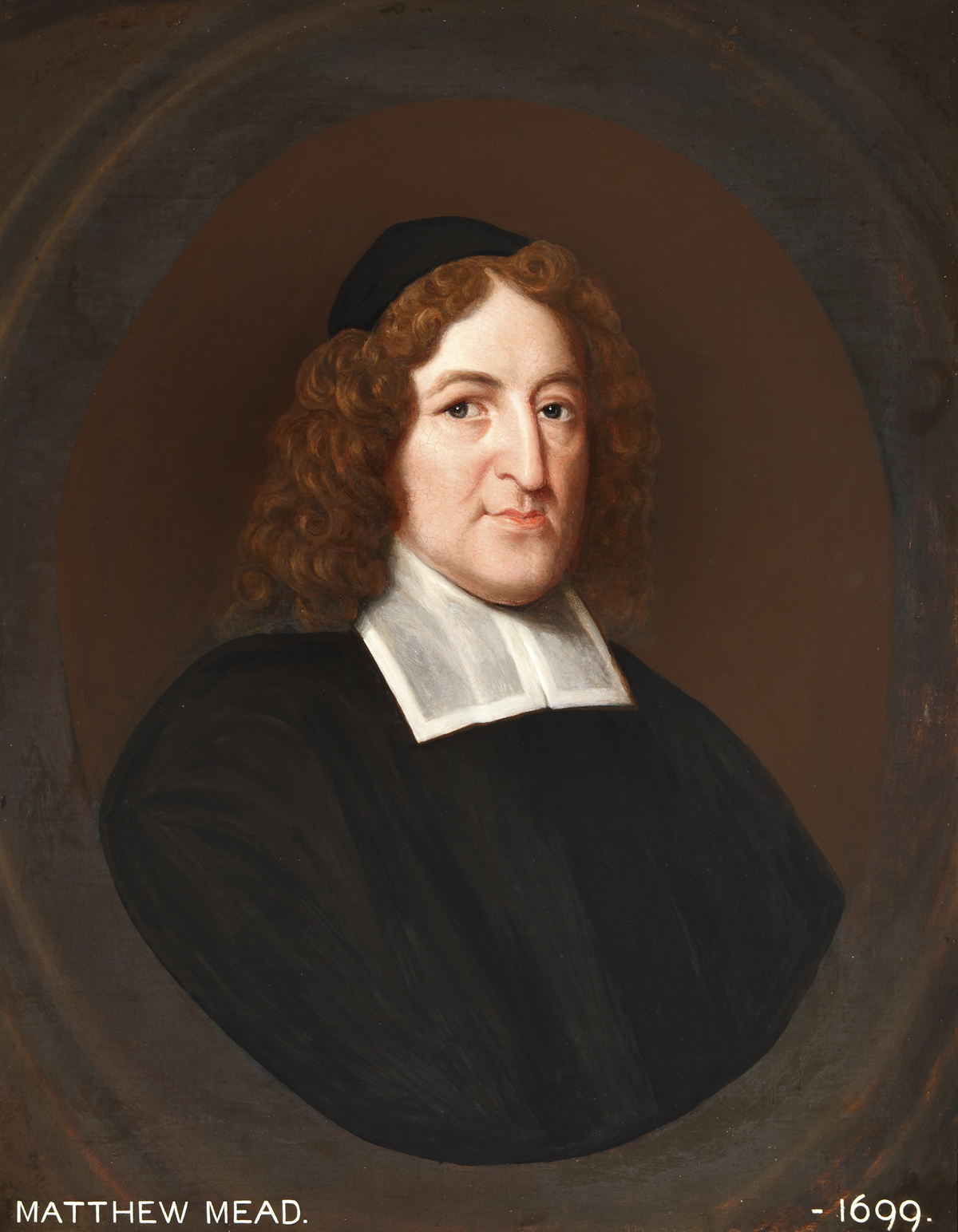
- Born: c. 1630; Leighton Buzzard, Bedfordshire
- Died: 16 October 1699 (aged 68–69)
- Occupation: Minister

Matthew Mead or Meade (c. 1630 – 16 October 1699) was an English Independent minister.

== Early life ==
The second son of Richard Mead of Mursley, Buckinghamshire, by his wife Joane, he was born about 1630 at Leighton Buzzard, Bedfordshire. In 1648, he was elected scholar, and on 6 August 1649 admitted a Fellow of King's College, Cambridge. He resigned on 6 June 1651, William Cole says to avoid expulsion, owing perhaps to refusal of the engagement; but he had gained ill-will by urging the expulsion of Richard Johnson and others.

== In search of a position ==
Francis Charlett, rector of Great Brickhill, Buckinghamshire, died in 1653; Mead hoped to succeed him, but the patron, John Duncombe, presented Thomas Clutterbuck. Mead, on the ground that the patron's right had lapsed, obtained a presentation under the Great Seal. Duncombe appealed to the law, and a verdict for Clutterbuck was given at the Aylesbury assizes. Mead began another suit on the plea of Duncombe's malignancy. Clutterbuck resigned his title, and Duncombe, in July 1655, presented Robert Hocknell, whom the 'commissioners for approbation' (triers) rejected, putting in Mead by aid of a troop of horse. After some violent proceedings, the matter was compromised by Duncombe's agreeing to present William Peirce, a nephew of Hugh Peters. Mead now became morning lecturer at St. Dunstan's, Stepney, the afternoon lecturer being William Greenhill, who held the vicarage. He lived in Gracechurch Street, and was admitted a member, on 28 December 1656, of the congregational church formed at Stepney by Greenhill in 1644. On 22 January 1658, he was appointed by Oliver Cromwell to the 'new chapel' of St Paul's Church, Shadwell.

From Shadwell, as well as from his lectureship, Mead was displaced at the Restoration of 1660. He obtained a lectureship at St Sepulchre's, Holborn, from which he was ejected by the Act of Uniformity 1662.

== Stepney congregation ==
In 1663, he was living at Worcester House, Stepney. Either the Conventicle Act (1664) or the Five Miles Act, which came into operation in 1666, drove him to Holland. He seems to have been in London during the great plague of 1665. On 31 January 1669, he was called to Stepney as assistant to Greenhill at Stepney. Shortly after Greenhill's death he was called (13 October 1671) to succeed him as pastor, and was ordained on 14 December 1671 by John Owen, Joseph Caryl, and two others. In 1674, a meeting-house (opened 13 September) was built for him at Stepney; its roof was upheld by four round pine pillars, presented to him by the States of Holland; above the ceiling was an attic with concealed entrance, a hiding-place for the congregation in troubled times. His congregation was the largest in London. On 1 May 1674, he instituted a Mayday sermon to the young; he always held a Good Friday service.

About 1680, Mead became the guardian of James Peirce, the Exeter heretic, who lived in his house for some years. In December 1682 Sir William Smith with a strong guard invaded his meeting-house, pulled down the pulpit, and broke up the forms. In June 1683 Mead was apprehended on suspicion of complicity in the Rye House Plot, and brought before the privy council, where the king ordered his discharge.

== Later life ==
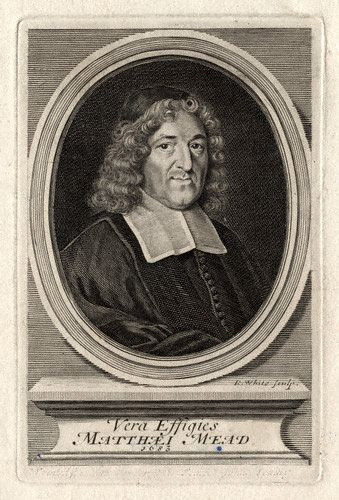
1683 engraving of Matthew Mead, by Robert White

Mead succeeded John Owen in September 1683 as one of the Tuesday morning lecturers (presbyterian and congregational) at the merchants' lecture in Pinners' Hall. Pleading there on one occasion on behalf of poor ministers, he got a collection of £300., ladies putting their rings and watches into the plates. In 1686 he was again in Holland, preaching at Utrecht; he returned on King James's declaration for liberty of conscience in 1687.

After the Glorious Revolution, galleries were built (25 March 1689) in his meeting-house, and the adjoining residence and garden were settled (16 July) by the congregation on Mead and his heirs. Mead supported the movement initiated (1690) by John Howe for an amalgamation of the presbyterian and congregationalist bodies. The 'happy union' held its meeting at Stepney on 6 April 1691, when Mead preached his sermon 'Two Sticks made One' (Ezek. xxxvii. 19). On the rupture of the union (1694) over the alleged heresies of Daniel Williams, Mead took a moderate part, but remained in the Pinners' Hall lectureship when the presbyterians seceded. When Edmund Calamy applied to him (1694) for ordination he declined to act, for fear of giving umbrage to others.

Mead preached his last sermon on May day 1699, and died on 16 October 1699, aged 70. He was buried in Stepney churchyard; Calamy gives the Latin inscription on his tombstone. Howe preached his funeral sermon. Peirce describes him as a gentleman and a scholar. An elegy on his death, Tristiæ Christianæ, was issued in a folio sheet, 1699.

== Works ==
Besides separate sermons, 1660–98, including funeral sermons for Thomas Rosewell (1692) and Timothy Cruso, Mead published:

- Ἐν ὀλίγῳ Χριστιανός, the Almost Christian Discovered, 1662. The substance of sermons at St. Sepulchre's, Holborn, in 1661, it was often reprinted; in Dutch, Utrecht, 1682; in Welsh, Merthyr Tydfil, 1825.
- Solomon's Prescription for the Removal of the Pestilence, 1666, 1667, with appendix.
- The Good of Early Obedience, 1683, Mayday sermons.
- The Vision of the Wheels, 1689, sermons on Ezekiel.

Posthumous were:

- The Young Man's Remembrancer, 3rd edit. 1701, his last two Mayday sermons; often reprinted.
- Original Sermons on the Jews; and on Falling into the Hands of … God … with a Memoir, 1836, edited from shorthand notes transcribed by James Andrews in 1703 and 1710.

Mead had a hand in the English Greek Lexicon, 1661. His farewell sermon before ejection was published separately, 1662, and also in the Compleat Collection, 1663. He wrote a preface to The Life and Death of Nathaniel Mather, 1689.

== Family ==
Mead married Elizabeth Walton on 3 January 1654 at St. Mary Woolnoth Church in the City of London. Elizabeth was from Allhallows, Lombard Street, London.

They had 13 children, of whom the physician Richard Mead was the 11th.

An elder son, Samuel, was a fellow-student with Calamy at Utrecht in 1687; published at Utrecht a Disputatio, 1686, an Exercitatio, 1687, and an Oratio, 1689; in 1694 he was an evening lecturer at Salters' Hall, but was not ordained, and became a chancery practitioner.
