= Francis Fuller the Elder =

English Nonconformist divine

Francis Fuller the elder (1637?–1701), was an English Nonconformist divine.

Fuller, born in or about 1637, was youngest son of John Fuller, vicar of Stebbing and minister of St. Martin's, Ironmonger Lane, London. He was educated at Queens' College, Cambridge, where he proceeded M.A. in 1660, and was incorporated at Oxford on 14 July 1663. He found himself, however, unable to conform, and was accordingly expelled from Warkworth, Northamptonshire, when acting as curate to Dr. Temple, the incumbent. Shortly afterwards he migrated to the west of England, preaching occasionally at Bath and Bristol. Finally he settled in London as assistant to Timothy Cruso at the English presbyterian meeting-house in Poor Jewry Lane.

He continued with Cruso's successor, William Harris, until his death on 21 July 1701, at the age of sixty-four. His funeral sermon was preached by his friend, Jeremiah White, and published at London, 1702. By his wife Bridget, who survived him, Fuller had two sons, born in Bristol, Francis and Samuel, who died about 1682. Calamy describes him as "a facetious pleasant man", while Samuel Palmer adds that he "discovered great sagacity in judging of some future events".

== Works ==
Job Orton found some of Fuller's works "very excellent, entertaining, and useful". Besides an address to the reader prefixed to Timothy Cruso's Three Last Sermons, London, 1698, Fuller wrote:

- Words to give to the Young-man Knowledg and Discretion. Or, the Law of Kindness in the Tongue of a Father to his Son, London, 1685.
- A Treatise of Faith and Repentance. (A Discourse of self-denial; being an appendix to the treatise of Faith), London, 1685.
- A Treatise of Grace and Duty, London, 1689.
- Peace in War by Christ, the Prince of Peace. A Sermon [on Micah v. 5] preached … on the last Publick Fast, June the 26th, 1696, London, 1696.
- Some Rules how to use the World, so as not to abuse either That or our Selves, London [1695?].
- Of the Shortness of Time [a sermon on 1 Cor. vii. 9], London, 1700.
