= Francis Fuller the Younger =

English medical writer (1670–1706)

Francis Fuller the younger (1670–1706), was an English medical writer.

Fuller was the second son of Francis Fuller, nonconformist divine, and his wife Bridget. He was born at Bristol, and entered at St. John's College, Cambridge, in 1687. He graduated B.A. at Cambridge in 1691, and M.A. in 1704. He had severe hypochondriasis following his too vigorous external treatment of an attack of itch. The hypochondriasis was accompanied by dyspepsia, and he cured himself by exercise on horseback and by emetics. This led him to write a book on the use of exercise in the treatment of disease, called Medicina Gymnastica, or a Treatise concerning the power of Exercise with respect to the Animal Œconomy, and the great necessity of it in the Cure of several Distempers, 1704. A second edition was published in the same year, a third in 1707, a fifth in 1718, a sixth in 1728, and a ninth and last in 1777. Sydenham had been an advocate for fresh air and exercise as remedies in consumption and hypochondriasis, and Fuller enlarges upon his suggestions. He shows but little knowledge of disease; he thought highly of millipedes in the treatment of rheumatism, and of liquorice in that of consumption, but has the merit of recommending the regular use of chafing, or, as it is now called, massage, where exercise by locomotion is impossible. He died in June 1706.
