= Edward Veel =

Edward Veel or Veal (c. 1632–1708) was an English academic, ejected minister and dissenting tutor.

== Life ==
Veel was born, probably in Gloucestershire, about 1632. He matriculated at Christ Church, Oxford, on 27 February 1651, and graduated B.A. 13 February 1652, M.A. 21 February 1654. Between those graduation dates, he was elected fellow of Trinity College, Dublin, and was promoted to a senior fellowship before 24 November 1656. On 14 August 1657 he was ordained at Winwick, Lancashire, by the fourth Lancashire presbyterian classis; this was on a call from the parish of Dunboyne, County Meath, where he had officiated from 1655, with a stipend under the civil establishment of Henry Cromwell.

On 3 July 1661 Veel was made B.D. at Trinity College. Shortly afterwards he was deprived for nonconformity, and, having received a certificate (31 December 1661) of his eminent usefulness from Stephen Charnock and five other nonconformist divines, he left Ireland in January 1662. He became chaplain to Sir William Waller, after whose death in 1668 he was pastor to a small congregation at New Stairs, Wapping. He kept also a dissenting academy at Stepney for "university learning"; among his pupils was Samuel Wesley.

Veel died on 6 June 1708, aged 76. His funeral sermon was preached in the parish church of Wapping by Thomas Simmons (d. March 1717–18), his successor.

== Works ==
Besides sermons (some in the Morning Exercises at Cripplegate), Veel published two volumes of Discourses, 1703, and 1705. He contributed to Matthew Poole's Annotations upon the Holy Bible of (1683).

His publications include;

- Early religion, or, The way for a young man to remember his Creator proposed in a sermon preach'd upon the death of Mr. Robert Linager, a young gentleman, who left this world, Octob. 26, 1682, with an account of some passages of his life and death, with Timothy Rogers
- Treatise of divine providence (London: printed by R. Roberts for Thomas Cockerill, 1684), also by Stephen Charnock and Richard Adams
- Proposals for printing (by subscription) an exposition on the whole book of Canticles, by the late reverend and learned divine John Davenport of New-England recommended by the persons undernam'd, and a specimen of the said book annex'd. (London: by Thomas Cocerill, 1687), also by Samuel Annesley
- Two discourses: the first, Of man's enmity to God, from Rom. VIII,7 ... ; the second, Of the salvation of sinners, from I Tim. I, 15 (1699)

== Notes ==
Attribution

This article incorporates text from a publication now in the public domain: Lee, Sidney, ed. (1899). "Veel, Edward". Dictionary of National Biography. Vol. 58. London: Smith, Elder & Co.
