= Old Jewry Meeting-house =

Coordinates: 51.5143°N 0.0909°W

The Old Jewry Meeting-house was a meeting-house for an English Presbyterian congregation, built around 1701, in the Old Jewry, a small street in the centre of the City of London. Its first minister was John Shower. In 1808 new premises were built in Jewin Street.

== Origin ==
Edmund Calamy the Younger, an ejected minister, gathered a congregation from 1672 at Curriers' Hall. After his death in 1685, it moved to Jewin Street in 1692, and, expanding, under John Shower, had a purpose-built meeting-house constructed nearby in Old Jewry. This structure, opened in around 1701, gave the congregation its name for over a century.

== New building ==
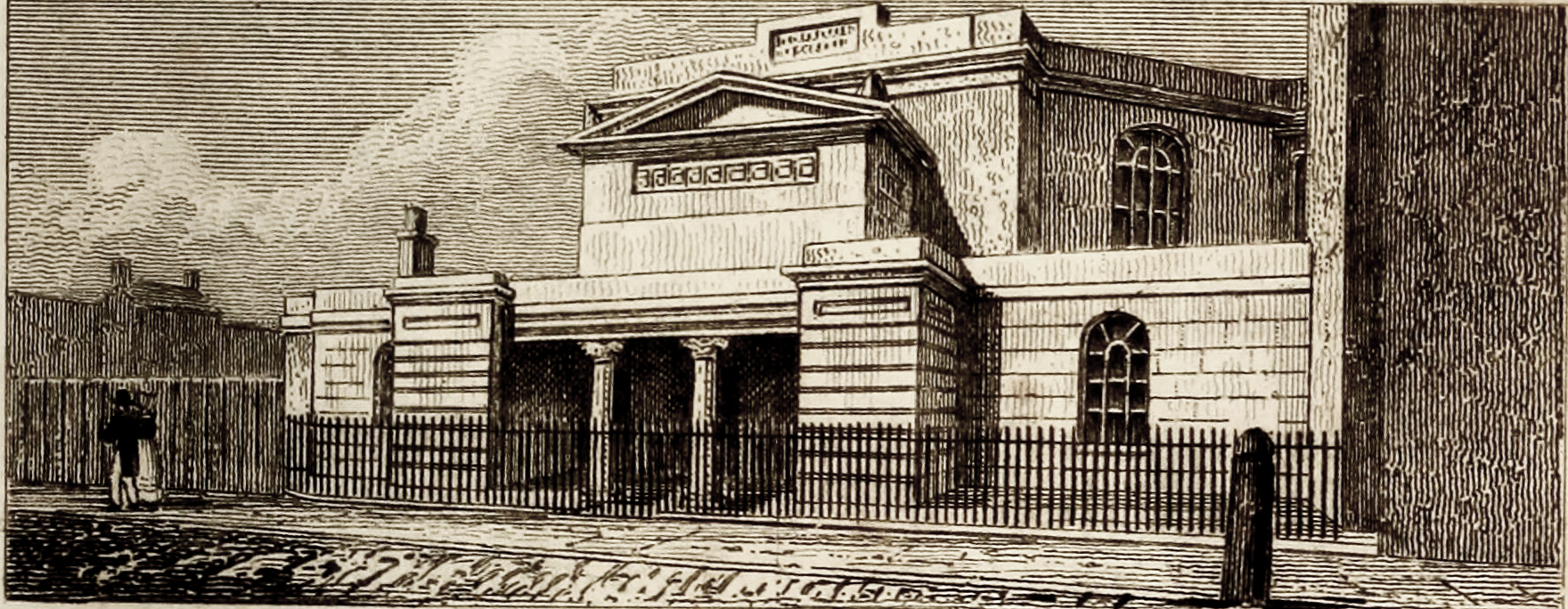
Old Jewry Chapel in Jewin Street, 1808–1846

In 1808 the meeting-house was rebuilt in Jewin Street, on a site almost opposite the one it had occupied between 1692 and 1701, for Abraham Rees as minister. (It was distinct from the Jewin Street Chapel, an Independent congregation, also known as "Woodgate's Meeting-House" after the previous minister; at the time the minister there was Timothy Priestley. See also the Jewin Welsh Presbyterian Chapel, which had premises on that street.)

The move came about because of the imminent end of the lease in Old Jewry, in 1810. The architect of the new chapel was Edmund Aikin. The old brick meeting-house was knocked down, to make way for the "New Bank Buildings", designed by Sir John Soane.

A decline in the congregation caused the closure of the chapel in 1840. It passed from Presbyterian control in 1841. The new Methodist tenants demolished the chapel in 1846, rebuilding it in a Gothic style in 1847.

== Ministers ==
- John Shower
- Timothy Rogers as assistant
- Joseph Bennett as assistant
- Simon Browne
- Thomas Leavesley
- Samuel Chandler
- Henry Miles
- Richard Price
- Thomas Amory
- Nathaniel White
- Abraham Rees
- 1825–1840 David Davison, resigned 1840, was the last pastor. The building became a Wesleyan chapel.
