= Stepney Meeting House =

Coordinates: 51.5174°N 0.0522°W

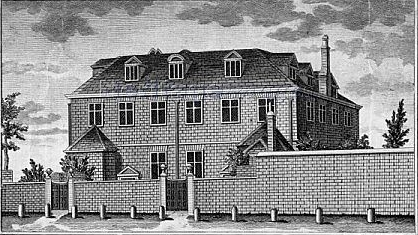
Stepney Meeting House in 1783

Stepney Meeting House was an independent church in Stepney, East London. It was founded in 1644 by Henry Barton and his wife, William Parker, John Odinsell, William Greenhill, and John Pococke, in the presence of Henry Burton, vicar at St Matthew Friday Street.

== History ==
William Greenhill was the first minister, from its foundation until his death in 1671. He was succeeded by Matthew Mead.

== Contemporary ==
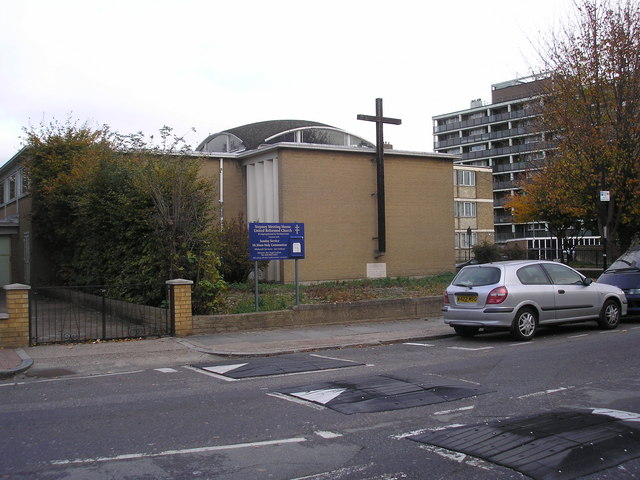
Stepney Meeting House in 2007

In 1974, following the 1972 merger of the Congregationalist church with the Presbyterians into the United Reformed Church, the Congregationalist of the Stepney Meeting House joined up with the Presbyterians of the John Knox Presbyterian Church of England, to create a single congregation.
