= List of honorary fellows of Homerton College, Cambridge =

This is a list of Honorary Fellows of Homerton College, Cambridge.

- Sue Black, Baroness Black of Strome
- Sir Leszek Borysiewicz
- Louise Casey, Baroness Casey of Blackstock
- Sir David Harrison
- Jesse Jackson
- Michelle Mitchell
- Daljit Nagra
- Meg Rosoff
- Jane Shaw
- Geoffrey Ward
