= Skillicorn =

Skillicorn is a surname. Notable people with the surname include:

- Alice Skillicorn (1894–1979), British academic
- Allen Skillicorn (born 1974), American politician
- Dennis Skillicorn (1959–2009), American murderer
