= Robert Mather =

Robert Mather may refer to:

- Robert Mather (Australian politician) (1914–2002), Australian politician, member of the Tasmanian House of Assembly
- Robert Butcher Mather (1851–1933), architect, civic leader and mayor in Blackpool, Lancashire, England
- Robert Cotton Mather (1808–1877), English missionary in India
