= John Corliss =

John Corliss may refer to:

- John Blaisdell Corliss (1851–1929), U.S. Representative from Michigan, 1895–1903
- Jack Corliss, scientist and discoverer of undersea hydrothermal vents
