= Kathleen Crane =

American marine geologist

- Born: 1951 (age 74–75)
- Education: Oregon State University, Scripps Institution of Oceanography
- Scientific career
- Fields: Geology, oceanography, geophysics

Kathleen (Kathy) Crane (born 1951) is an American marine geologist, best known for her contributions to the discovery of hydrothermal vents on the Galápagos Rift along the East Pacific Rise in the mid-1970s.

== Education ==
Crane received a Bachelors of Arts in Geology, with a minor in German, from Oregon State University in 1973. In 1977, she received a doctorate from Scripps Institution of Oceanography with a dissertation entitled "Hydrothermal Activity and Near Axis Structure at Mid-Ocean Spreading Centers". From 1977-1979, she studied mid-ocean ridges as a postdoctoral fellow with Robert (Bob) Ballard at the Woods Hole Oceanographic Institution.

== Discovery of hydrothermal vents ==
In June 1976, on the Pleiades II expedition on the R/V Melville to the Galápagos Rift, Crane detected a 0.1 °C anomaly using a temperature-monitoring system she had developed for the Deep-Tow seafloor imaging system run by Fred Noel Spiess of the Marine Physical Laboratory at Scripps Institution of Oceanography. The temperature anomaly, as well as seafloor images of volcanic features, provided strong support for the hypothesis that hydrothermal vents existed on the seafloor. Crane nick-named the sites “Clambake I" and "Clambake II", after the abundance of clamshells in the area, and deployed transponders near the vents. She published the maps and temperature anomaly in the Journal of Geophysical Research in November 1977, and on the structure and tectonics in the Journal of Geology in November 1978, and in the Journal of Geophysical Research in October 1979.

In February 1977, Crane's map and transponders enabled a team of geochemists and geophysicists, led by chief scientists John (Jack) Corliss, from Oregon State University, Tjeerd van Andel from Stanford University, Richard (Dick) Von Herzen from Woods Hole Oceanographic Institution, and Robert (Bob) Ballard from Woods Hole Oceanographic Institution, to return to the Clambake site with the deep-ocean research submersible, DSV Alvin on the R/V Knorr. Close-up photography and biological sampling of Clambake I and II led to the discovery of the biological process of chemosynthesis in clams, mussels, and tube worms in the deep ocean.

In the 1980s, Crane was involved in mapping hydrothermal vents on the Juan de Fuca Ridge and additional vent fields along the East Pacific Rise. She also published geophysical models of along-axis spacing of sea-floor volcanism.

In 1990, Crane was part of an expedition of American, Soviet and Canadian scientists, sponsored by the National Geographic Society and the Soviet Academy of Sciences, that discovered hydrothermal vents on the bottom of Lake Baikal in southern Siberia, which revealed that the lake lies in a continental rift zone.

== Scientific career ==
From 1979-2001, Crane was a research associate at Lamont–Doherty Earth Observatory, where she studied the formation of mid-ocean ridges. In 1985, she was awarded a Fulbright Award at University of Oslo and University of Paris. From 1985 to 2001, she was a professor of oceanography at Hunter College of the City University of New York. From 1993-2001, she managed the Arctic Environmental Security program at the United States Naval Research Laboratory, served as U.S. mission coordinator for the Russian-American Long-term Census of the Arctic program, and authored the Arctic Environmental Atlas. From 2001 to 2015, she was a Program Manager in the Arctic Research Program of the Climate Program Office of the National Oceanic and Atmospheric Administration (NOAA).

Crane has published over 90 peer-reviewed articles and is the author of the 2003 autobiography, Sea Legs: Tales of a Woman Oceanographer, which received acclaim as a personal memoir as well as for its first-hand reports of "ocean science, Cold War science, and women's participation in science".

== See also ==
- Hydrothermal vent
