= Alan Bamford =

British academic

Alan George Bamford CBE, (12 July 1930 – 18 June 2011) was a British academic. From 1985 to 1991, he was Principal of Homerton College, Cambridge.

Bamford was educated at Prescot Grammar School and Borough Road College, London. He was a teacher in Lancashire from 1952 to 1962. Bamford was a Lecturer in Primary Education at the University of Liverpool from 1962 to 1963; Senior Lecturer in Education at Chester College from 1963 to 1966; Principal Lecturer in Education at St Katharine’s College, Liverpool from 1966 to 1971; Principal of Westhill Coll., Birmingham from 1971 to 1985.

Academic offices
Preceded by Alison Shrubsole	Principal of Homerton College, Cambridge; 1985–1991	Succeeded by Katharine Bridget Perry
