= John Horobin =

John Charles Horobin (1856–1902) was a British academic. He was the first Principal of Homerton College, Cambridge.

Horobin was born in Tean, Staffordshire and educated at Emmanuel College, Cambridge, graduating BA in 1888 and MA in 1892. He was a member of the London School Board from 1891 to 1896; and Principal of Homerton from 1890 to his death on 26 July 1902.

Academic offices
Preceded by First appointment	Principal of Homerton College, Cambridge; 1894–1902	Succeeded by Mary Miller Allan
