= Kate Pretty =

British archaeologist and college principal

Katharine Bridget 'Kate' Pretty, CBE, FSA (born 18 October 1945) is a British archaeologist and academic. She served as Principal of Homerton College, Cambridge from 1991 to 2013, and additionally Deputy Vice-Chancellor of the University of Cambridge from 2010 to 2013

== Early life and education ==
Pretty was born on 18 October 1945. She was educated at King Edward VI High School for Girls, a private school in Birmingham. She studied at New Hall, Cambridge, graduating with Bachelor of Arts (BA) and Doctor of Philosophy (PhD) degrees.

== Academic career ==
At New Hall, Cambridge, Pretty was a college lecturer and Fellow in archaeology from 1972 to 1991; admissions tutor from 1979 to 1985; and senior tutor from 1985 to 1991. She was Principal of Homerton College, Cambridge from 1991 to 2013. Under her leadership, Homerton became the newest college of the University of Cambridge, having previously been an Approved Society. In addition, she served as Pro-Vice-Chancellor, from 2004 to 2010, and Deputy Vice-Chancellor, from 2010 to 2013, of the university.

== Honours ==
In November 2009, Pretty was appointed Commander of the Order of the British Empire (CBE) 'for services to higher education'.

On 9 March 2000, she was elected Fellow of the Society of Antiquaries of London (FSA). In October 2011, she was elected an Honorary Fellow of Harris Manchester College, Oxford.

== Personal life ==
Pretty was married to fellow archaeologist Tjeerd van Andel.

Academic offices
Preceded by Alison Cheveley Shrubsole	Principal of Homerton College, Cambridge; 1991–2013	Succeeded by Geoff Ward
