= Philip Kuenen =

Dutch geologist

Philip Henry Kuenen
- Born: 22 July 1902; Dundee, United Kingdom
- Died: 17 December 1976 (aged 74); Leiden, Netherlands
- Awards: Francis P. Shepard Medal; Gustav-Steinmann-Medaille (1966)
- Scientific career
- Fields: Geology
- Doctoral students: Tjeerd van Andel

Philip Henry Kuenen (22 July 1902, in Dundee – 17 December 1976, in Leiden) was a Dutch geologist.

Kuenen spent his early childhood in Scotland, where his father (Johannes Petrus Kuenen) was professor of physics at University College, Dundee until 1906. He studied geology at Leiden University, where he was a pupil of K. Martin and B.G. Escher. He finished his studies in 1925 and then became assistant to Escher. He worked on paleontology and experimental geology.

In 1929–1930 Kuenen participated in the Snellius expedition to the seas surrounding the Sunda Islands of the Dutch East Indies. In 1934 he became lecturer at Groningen University. Because the Dutch government had decided that geology would not be a major subject at Groningen University, Kuenen was able to dedicate most of his time to research. Only in 1946 he became a full professor, during the German occupation in World War II the Nazis had prevented this because he had British ancestors. The same year he became member of the Royal Netherlands Academy of Arts and Sciences.

Kuenen is known particularly for his work on marine geology and he published a book on the subject. Some of his other contributions to geology were geochemical calculations about sediments and the water cycle and research on absolute and relative sea level changes, the rounding of sediment particles, normal faulting in the continental slope domain and especially turbidites and turbidity currents. He studied many geological and sedimentological topics through experiments as well as in geological outcrops.

In 1970 the Doeglas commission advised the Dutch government to stop all geological research in Groningen, and to concentrate geological research at other universities. Kuenen was a big opponent of this plan but could not prevent it. After a neural attack in 1970, he retired in 1972 and died at Leiden in December 1976.

== See also ==
- Johannes Kuenen

== Sources ==
- L.M.J.U. van Straaten, 1977: In memoriam Ph. H. Kuenen in Geologie & Mijnbouw 56 (1), pp. 1–3
- A.J. Pannekoek, 1962: Geological research at the universities of The Netherlands, 1877–1962 in Geologie & Mijnbouw, vol. 41 no. 4 pp. 161–174
- Bourgeois, J., 1990. Philip Henry Kuenen: Dictionary of Scientific Biography, 2nd Supplement. NY: Scribner's. Vol. 17, pp. 509–514.
