= Beryl Paston Brown =

British academic and educator

Beryl Paston Brown DBE
- Brown in 1967
- Born: 7 March 1909; Streatham, London, U.K.
- Died: 25 July 1997 (age 88); Lewes, East Sussex, U.K.
- Occupations: Educator, college administrator
- Known for: Principal, Homerton College, Cambridge (1961– 1971)

Dame Beryl Paston Brown, DBE (7 March 1909 – 25 July 1997) was a British academic and educator. She was Principal of Homerton College, Cambridge, from 1961 to 1971.

== Early life and education ==
Beryl Paston Brown was born in Streatham, Surrey, the daughter of Paston Charles Brown and Florence May Brown. Her father was a bank clerk. She was educated at Streatham Hill High School and Newnham College, Cambridge. She completed a teacher training course in London, however the Great Depression made it very difficult to secure a teaching post.

== Career ==
Paston Brown was a lecturer at Portsmouth Training College from 1933 to 1937, and at Goldsmiths' College from 1937 to 1951. She was a temporary lecturer at Newnham College from 1944 to 1946.

She was principal of the City of Leicester Training College from 1952 to 1961. As Principal of Homerton College, Cambridge University, from 1961 to 1971, Dame Beryl was credited with having developed a contemporary, relatively liberal social and academic life for students, as well as a teaching course degree which was validated by London University. "Dame Beryl combined high intelligence and great charm with a commitment to some very enlightened principles, and in many ways she set the tone for Homerton’s recognition by the University as a place of serious intellectual capability," recalled her colleague David Bridges. A proposal for the establishment of the B.Ed to the Council of the Senate of Cambridge University was first turned down in 1966, for fear of lowering standards, but was eventually approved in the 1970s with the assistance of Newnham College. In 1971 she retired, and was succeeded by Alison Cheveley Shrubsole.

Paston Brown was chair of the Association of Teachers in Colleges and Departments of Education from 1965 to 1966, and editor of the association's journal, Education for Teaching. She was a member of the Newsom Committee, and helped produce the report Half Our Future (1963).

Beryl Paston Brown was named DBE in 1967. She retired to Lewes, East Sussex, where she became an Open University tutor and was awarded an Open University honorary degree.

== Publications ==
- "Literature as Medium for the Synthesis of School and Society" (1946)
- "‘Participation’‐‐and College Government" (1971)
- Teacher Education for a Multi-Cultural Society (1978, report)

== Death and legacy ==
Dame Beryl Paston Brown died in Lewes, East Sussex in 1997, aged 88. Homerton College has a portrait of Paston Brown, painted by Richard P. Cook.

Academic offices
Preceded by Alice Havergal Skillicorn	Principal of Homerton College, Cambridge; 1961–1971	Succeeded by Alison Cheveley Shrubsole
