= Congregational Board of Education =

UK academic organization

The Congregational Board of Education was set up in 1843 "to promote popular education, partaking of a religious character and under no circumstances receiving aid from public money administered by Government" (extract from original rules).

== The earlier Congregational Fund Board ==
An earlier organisation – the Independent or Congregational Fund Board – was established in 1695 to assist poor ministers and to give young men who had already received a classical education, the theological and other training preparatory to the Christian ministry.

Until 1826, when what is now University College, London opened, English Dissenters were largely excluded from higher education, as only practising Anglicans could graduate from Oxford and Cambridge universities. A system of dissenting academies developed, including Homerton Academy and Hoxton Academy in London.

== The 1843 organisation ==
With liberalisation, the Congregationalists adapted their focus, and the Board reorganised the former Homerton Academy as New College, London and what became Homerton College, Cambridge. Morley Memorial Primary School in Cambridge was also set up as a training institution for students at Homerton College.

In 1868, the poet Matthew Arnold – who was a school inspector by profession – was commissioned to report on the eligibility of the Homerton schools for public funding.
