= Tjeerd van Andel =

Dutch geologist (1923–2010)

Tjeerd Hendrik van Andel
- Born: 15 January 1923; Rotterdam, Netherlands
- Died: 17 September 2010 (aged 87); Cambridge, England
- Education: University of Groningen
- Spouse: Kate Pretty
- Awards: Francis P. Shepard Medal; Van Waterschoot van der Gracht Medal
- Scientific career
- Fields: Marine geology, geoarchaeology
- Workplaces: Scripps Institute of Oceanography; Oregon State University; Stanford University; University of Cambridge
- Thesis: Provenance, transport and deposition of Rhine sediments; a heavy minerals study on river sands from the drainage area of the Rhine. (1950)
- Doctoral advisor: Philip Kuenen
- Doctoral students: Jack Corliss

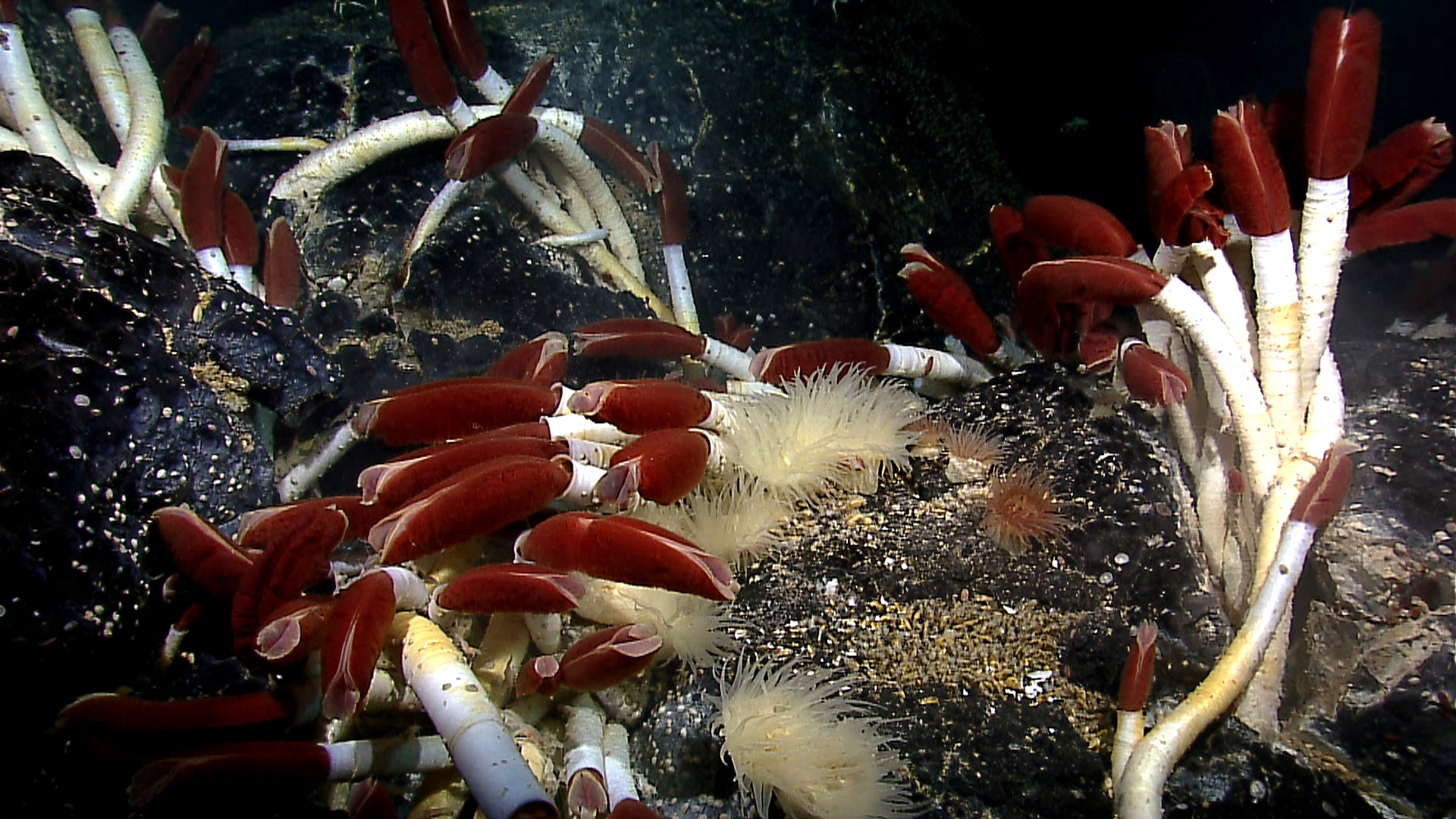
Colony of Riftia tubeworms, anemones and mussels from a hydrothermal vent field on the Galapagos Rise. Image from the 2011 NOAA Okeanos Explorer Program, Galapagos Rift Expedition.

Tjeerd Hendrik van Andel (15 January 1923 – 17 September 2010), also known as Jerry, was a Dutch geologist, oceanographer and geoarchaeologist. Over a long career he worked in both industry and academia, and his work was recognised with the award of a number of medals and distinguished fellowships. He led the first expedition and dive with the crewed submersible Alvin that discovered life around deep hydrothermal vents in 1977.

== Early life and education ==
Tjeerd van Andel was born in January 1923 in Rotterdam, Netherlands. His mother and father were a psychologist and a psychiatrist. He had a younger sister, Mies, and they spent some of their early years on Java, where Van Andel's interest in the past began with visits to Hindu temples. Van Andel went to the University of Groningen to study archaeology in 1940, where he studied under Albert Egges van Giffen. After the Second World War, when Van Andel returned to his studies, he embarked on a PhD with geologist Philip Kuenen, completing his dissertation in 1950 on the heavy minerals and sediments of the River Rhine.

== Career ==
Van Andel first worked for Royal Dutch Shell, Amsterdam. He later moved with Shell to Venezuela, before taking up a post at Scripps Institution of Oceanography in California in 1957. In 1967, Van Andel was appointed to develop a marine geology and oceanography programme at Oregon State University. In 1976, Van Andel took up a professorship in oceanography at Stanford University where he continued his work in marine geology. He also became involved in landscape archaeological projects in the Argolis region of the Peloponnese, Greece. In 1987, Van Andel retired, and moved to the United Kingdom where he joined the Department of Earth Sciences at the University of Cambridge as an honorary professor. Here, he continued to teach, and developed new research projects in geosciences and geo-archaeology.

== Deep sea discoveries ==
In 1974 Van Andel led the first dives in the submersible Alvin to examine the volcanic rocks of the seafloor at the Project FAMOUS site on the Mid-Atlantic Ridge. In February 1977, Van Andel dived again on Alvin with pilot Jack Donnelly and scientist Jack Corliss, this time to the Galapagos ridge beneath the Pacific ocean. The target location for the dive had been identified the year before by marine geologist Kathy Crane, from deep-towed imagery, but this descent was the first crewed dive to the Pacific sea floor on Alvin. As they descended to 2,500 m (8,200 ft) water depth, they began to see giant white clam shells, up to 60 cm (2 ft) long, in heaps on the seafloor, clustered around hot springs. Van Andel, Corliss and Donnelly were the first people to directly observe the hot, seafloor hydrothermal vents, and to see the completely unexpected deep sea fauna of molluscs and other marine animals that lived around these vents. During the Galapagos expedition, Alvin was equipped with a robotic arm to grab rock samples from the sea floor. Instead, it was put into service to collect shellfish. These samples then had to be bottled in vodka on ship, as the expedition had no other biological preserving medium available.

Van Andel recorded his observations in a personal diary, excerpted by Naomi Oreskes:

In the middle of this ... barren vastness ... a small oasis ... with coral gardens, pink and gold anemones, white crabs in great variety and profusion, yellow, brown, liver-colored fish, medusoid large clumps of some kind of mussel ten inches long, crevices filled with their huge bleached shells ... What produced this little paradise in the ... sea floor desert?

== New Views on an Old Planet ==
In 1985, Van Andel published the book New Views on an Old Planet, which used the theories of continental drift and plate tectonics to explore elements of the history of the planet. The book developed from an introductory class Van Andel taught to undergraduates and was designed to cater to non-geologists. Ten years later, Van Andel published a revised second edition with the strap line "a history of global change", reflecting the breadth of the new volume. One reviewer commented that the book was "the most lucid and accessible summary of earth history in print".

== Awards ==
Van Andel's contributions were recognised with a number of senior medals and awards, including:

- 1978 Francis P. Shepard Medal in Marine Geology
- 1984 Van Waterschoot van der Gracht Medal, from the Royal Netherlands Geological Society.

Van Andel was elected a corresponding member of the Royal Netherlands Academy of Arts and Sciences in 1975. In 1980, he was elected a Fellow of the American Geophysical Union. He was also a Fellow of the American Association for the Advancement of Science (from 1981) and a member of the California Academy of Sciences.

== Personal life ==
Van Andel was married to archaeologist Kate Pretty. He died of heart failure on 17 September 2010 in Cambridge, England, aged 87.
