= Julie Corliss =

American medical writer

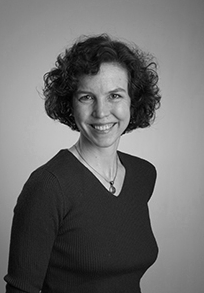
Julie Corliss

Julie Corliss is an American medical writer with more than sixteen years of experience in consumer health issues. Her work has been published in Newsweek, HealthNews and Harvard Health Publications. She helped Dr. George L. Blackburn write Break Through Your Set Point a weight loss book published by HarperCollins.

== Biography ==
After receiving a BA in biology at Oberlin College, she worked for several years as a research assistant for Dr. William E. Connor, an internationally known expert on the health benefits of fish oil. She obtained a master's certificate in science communication at the University of California, Santa Cruz, then worked as a writer and public affairs specialist at the National Cancer Institute, the US Department of Agriculture and the Center for Astrophysics | Harvard & Smithsonian.

For eight years, she was a staff medical writer for HealthNews, a consumer health publication affiliated with the New England Journal of Medicine. Since 1993, she has done freelance medical writing for a variety of publications, including Newsweek, Howard Hughes Medical Institute Bulletin, Cancer Updates, Research, and Education (CURE) and Harvard Women's Health Watch.

She currently works as a senior medical editor for Harvard Health Publications.

Her father is the scientist, Jack Corliss.

== Selected publications ==
=== Newsweek ===
- "Brain Check", cover story on Mind-Body Medicine (co-authored with Herbert Benson, MD, and Geoffrey Cowley), (September 2004_

=== Harvard Health Publications ===
- "Weight Less, Live Longer: Strategies for successful weigh loss" (2006)
- "Hands: Strategies for strong, pain-free hands" (2005)
- "Celiac disease: When the body goes against the grains" (July 2006)
- "Nitroglycerin: A blast from the past remains a trusted standby" (July 2005)

=== Health News ===
- "Food Irradiation: A Recipe for Safer Food?" (June 2004)
- "'Vegging Out' for Better Health?" (November 2003)
- "Low-Carb Diet Lowdown" (July 2003)
- "Space for Women: Perspectives on Careers in Science" (booklet) (1995)
