= Mary Allan (British academic) =

Scottish academic and educator

- Born: 12 August 1869; Glasgow, Scotland, U.K.
- Died: 1 November 1947 (age 78); Cambridge, England, U.K.
- Occupations: Academic administrator, educator
- Known for: Principal of Homerton College, Cambridge (1903–1935)

Mary Miller Allan (12 August 1869 – 1 November 1947) was a Scottish academic and educator. From 1903 to 1935, she was Principal of Homerton College, Cambridge.

== Early life and education ==
Allan was born and raised in Glasgow, the daughter of William Allan and Margaret Young. She was educated at the University of St Andrews, graduating with a Lady Literate in Arts (LLA) degree in 1894, which was the practice before women were allowed to earn standard degrees at the university.

== Career ==
Allan was head teacher at the Higher Grade Central School in Leeds when she became principal of Homerton College, Cambridge in 1903. She succeeded John Horobin, though Horobin's widow Maud Brereton was acting principal after his death. Allan appointed female lecturers, and became the first female president of the Training College Association in 1916. She retired from Homerton in 1935. She was succeeded as principal by Alice Skillicorn.

== Death and legacy ==
Mary Miller Allan died in 1947 in Cambridge, at the age of 78. There is a Mary Allan Building at Cambridge, named in her memory. A 1919 portrait of Allan, by Hugh Goldwin Rivière, is in the college's collection.

Academic offices
Preceded by John Charles Horobin	Principal of Homerton College, Cambridge; 1903–1935	Succeeded by Alice Havergal Skillicorn
