= Simon Woolley, Baron Woolley of Woodford =

British politician and activist (born 1961)

The Right Honourable The Lord Woolley of Woodford
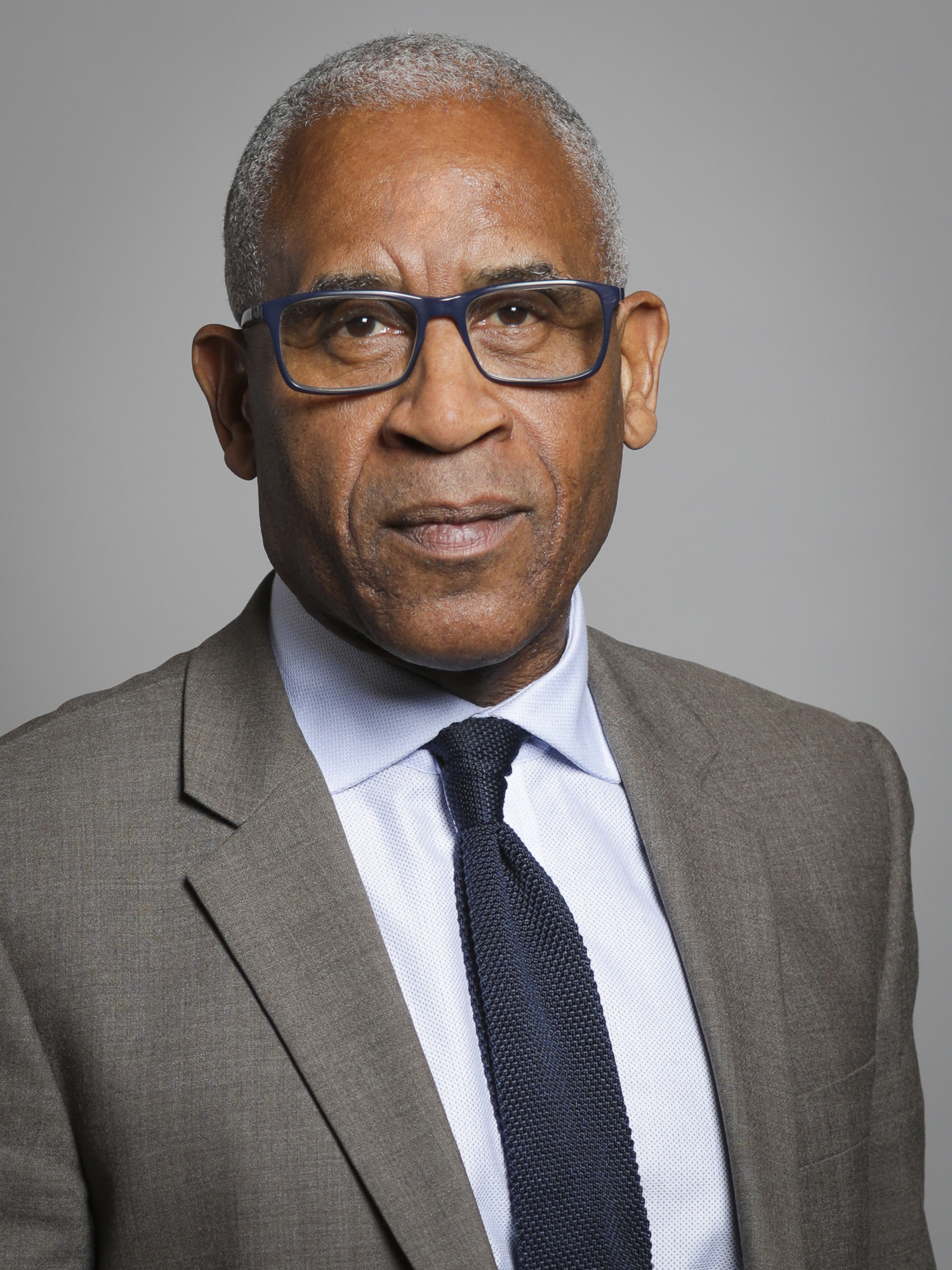

Member of the House of Lords
- Lord Temporal
- Life peerage 14 October 2019

Principal of Homerton College, Cambridge
- Incumbent
- Assumed office 1 October 2021
- Preceded by: Geoff Ward

Personal details
- Born: 24 December 1961 (age 64) Leicester, East Midlands, England
- Party: Crossbench
- Education: Middlesex University (BA); Queen Mary University of London (MA)
- Occupation: Politician and activist
- Known for: Political activism Operation Black Vote (OBV) founder

Simon Woolley, Baron Woolley of Woodford (born 24 December 1961), is a British politician and activist. He founded and was director of Operation Black Vote (OBV), is a trustee of the charity Police Now, and has been Principal of Homerton College, Cambridge, since October 2021.

Woolley has been a crossbench member of the House of Lords since October 2019. He was chair of the UK Government Race Disparity Unit advisory group between January 2018 and July 2020.

== Early life and education ==
Woolley was born to Lolita, a Windrush generation nurse in Leicester in the East Midlands of England on 24 December 1961, and aged two, she sent him to a Catholic orphanage. He was fostered then adopted and raised by parents Phillis and Dan Fox. Woolley grew up on the St Matthew's estate, which he has described as "a working-class council estate but it was a hard-working council estate. You never felt that you were short of anything". Woolley's adoptive parents fostered a number of other children during his childhood. Dan Fox died when Woolley was 14 years old.

Woolley left school without any A-Level qualifications and started his working life in an apprenticeship as a car mechanic. He moved to London at the age of 19 and spent four successful years in advertising, employed by The Rank Organisation in Wardour Street, before deciding to study Spanish and Politics at Middlesex University. During his studies, Woolley spent a year in Costa Rica and Colombia. He studied at Queen Mary University of London, and was awarded a Master of Arts in Hispanic literature from the University of London in 1994.

== Career ==
Woolley became engaged with British politics, joining the campaign group Charter 88. He started to research the potential impact of a black vote, which he argued could influence electoral outcomes in marginal seats. These findings encouraged Woolley to launch Operation Black Vote (OBV) in 1996. Operation Black Vote has launched voter registration campaigns, an app to inspire and inform black and minority ethnic (BME) individuals and worked with Saatchi & Saatchi on a pro bono advertising campaign.

Woolley also worked to empower communities and to integrate better politics education into the school curriculum. The Esmée Fairbairn Foundation estimated that Woolley's efforts encouraged millions of people to vote. Much of his work has been around nurturing BME civic and politic talent.

Woolley served as a Commissioner for the Equality and Human Rights Commission. In 2008, the Government Equalities Office released Woolley's report How to achieve better BME political representation. He was appointed to the Equalities Commission in 2009. He has launched two governmental investigations, including REACH, which looked to tackle the alienation of black youth, as well as working with Harriet Harman on the political representation of black and minority ethnic women. He worked with Bernie Grant, Al Sharpton, Naomi Campbell and Jesse Jackson on grassroots campaigns highlighting racial discrimination.

In 2017, Operation Black Vote, The Guardian newspaper and Green Park Ltd launched the Colour of Power, which to date is the most in-depth look at the racial make-up of Britain's top jobs across 28 sectors that dominate British society. The results were reported in The Guardian: "Barely 3% of Britain’s most powerful and influential people are from black and minority ethnic groups, according to a broad new analysis that highlights startling inequality despite decades of legislation to address discrimination".

In 2019, Woolley called for local councillors to become more diverse, after it emerged that of the 200 councillors in South Gloucestershire, Bath and North East Somerset and North Somerset, none was from a black, Asian or minority ethnic background. In May 2019, Woolley and Operation Black Vote launched a ground-breaking report into more than 130 key local authorities that emphasised the lack of BME representation. In more than one-third of those local authorities, many with sizeable BME populations, they either had no or just one BME councillor.

Along with former Downing Street advisors Nick Timothy and Will Tanner, Woolley is seen as the inspiration and one of the architects for the Government of the United Kingdom Race Disparity Unit, and he served as the Advisory Chair. He has worked with the Open Source Foundation on their global drugs policy projects. He secured £90 million of funding to encourage disadvantaged young people to work. When Operation Black Vote started, there were four black or minority ethnic members of parliament; as of 2019, there are more than 50. Woolley has written for The Guardian, Huffington Post and The Independent.

On 30 March 2021, it was announced that Woolley had been elected as the next principal of Homerton College, Cambridge. On 1 October 2021, he took up the appointment in succession to Professor Geoffrey Ward. Woolley is the first black man to be head of an Oxbridge college.

In 2022, Woolley's memoir Soar: My Journey from Council Estate to House of Lords was published, with a foreword by Rev. Jesse Jackson (Manilla Press/Bonnier Books).

In February 2025, Woolley was announced as one of the new Independent Non-Executive Directors of the Co-operative Group.

In July 2026, Woolley was one of several high-profile figures to make statements and also launch a petition in defence of Jason Arday, who had been accused in national media of plagiarism and serial dishonesty. At a vigil for Arday in Trafalgar Square on 17 August 2026, Woolley called the press coverage of Arday, a "public assassination" and a "lynching".

== Awards and honours ==
Woolley has been included in the Powerlist – which features the 100 most influential people of African or African Caribbean heritage in the United Kingdom – every year since 2012. He was selected as one of the Evening Standard's Most Influential People in 2010. In 2010 and 2011, he was selected as one of The Daily Telegraph's 100 Most Influential People.

In 2012, he was awarded an honorary doctorate for his equality efforts from the University of Westminster. He was made an Honorary fellow of Magdalen College, Oxford in 2022.

Woolley was appointed a Knight Bachelor in the 2019 Birthday Honours for his services to race equality, thus becoming Sir Simon Woolley. He said he had to think hard about accepting the honour: "Many black or minority ethnic individuals have to think hard about whether to take an award or not, particularly those offered an award with empire in its title ... It's a difficult choice and whatever decision they make I fully support them. In the case of the knighthood, I didn't have to make that exact call. It has more to do with medieval times and the 13th century than empire."

Woolley was nominated for a life peerage to sit as a crossbencher in the House of Lords by Prime Minister Theresa May in her 2019 Resignation Honours List. He was created Baron Woolley of Woodford, of Woodford in the London Borough of Redbridge, on 14 October 2019. He sat on the Lords Youth Unemployment Committee from 28 January 2021 until 16 November 2021.
