= Alison Shrubsole =

British educationist and university administrator

Alison Cheveley Shrubsole CBE (7 April 1925 - 4 October 2002) was a British educationist and university administrator.

She served for 14 years as Principal of Homerton College, Cambridge from 1971 to 1985. Prior to this she was Principal of Philippa Fawcett College, and before this Principal of Machakos Training College in East Africa. She graduated from Royal Holloway, University of London with a degree in history, before studying at the University of London's Institute of Education (now part of University College, London).

She was a Fellow of Hughes Hall, Cambridge, was appointed a Commander of the Most Excellent Order of the British Empire in 1982, and was awarded an honorary degree by the Open University in 1985.

Academic offices
Preceded by Beryl Paston Brown	Principal of Homerton College, Cambridge; 1971–1985	Succeeded by Alan George Bamford
