= Geoff Ward (academic) =

British academic (born 1954)

Principal of Homerton College, Cambridge
- In office 2013–2021
- Preceded by: Kate Pretty
- Succeeded by: Simon Woolley

Personal details
- Born: Geoffrey Christopher Ward; 1954 (age 71–72)

Academic background
- Education: Manchester Grammar School
- Alma mater: Clare College, Cambridge

Academic work
- Discipline: English literature
- Sub-discipline: American literature; New York School
- Institutions: University of Liverpool; University of Dundee; Royal Holloway, University of London; Homerton College, Cambridge; University of Cambridge

Geoffrey Christopher Ward, FRSA (born 1954) is a British academic specialising in American literature. He became Principal of Homerton College, University of Cambridge in 2013 (succeeded in 2021 by Simon Woolley). In 2020, the College announced that Ward would retire in September 2021 after eight years as Principal.

== Early life and education ==
Ward was educated at Manchester Grammar School, and Clare College, Cambridge, where he read English Literature and graduated with a first-class degree in 1975. Later, in 2006, he graduated with a Doctor of Philosophy (PhD), also from the University of Cambridge.

== Academic career ==
Ward formerly worked as lecturer then senior lecturer in English at the University of Liverpool. Following a year spent lecturing in Japan, he took up a Chair and the Headship of Department at the University of Dundee in 1995.

His first book Statutes of Liberty: The New York School of Poets (1993: new edition, 2001) was followed by other books and articles, including The Writing of America: Literature and Cultural Identity from the Puritans to the Present (Polity, 2002), which he researched during a year spent in the USA as a Fellow of the Leverhulme Foundation.

In 2002, he was made a Deputy Principal at Dundee. He left four years later to serve as Dean of the Faculty of Arts and then Vice Principal at Royal Holloway, University of London. He joined Homerton College, Cambridge, as Principal in 2013, serving in the role until 2021.

In addition to his scholarly work, Ward has written and presented occasional broadcasts for BBC Radio 3, including on David Foster Wallace. A Life Fellow of the Royal Society of Arts, he has also been elected to an Honorary Fellowship at Harris Manchester College, Oxford.

== Personal life ==
In 1992, Ward married Marion Wynne-Davies. Wynne-Davies is also a scholar of literature, and specialises in Renaissance literature. Together, they have two sons.

Academic offices
Preceded by Dr Kate Pretty	Principal of Homerton College, Cambridge; 2013 – 2021	Succeeded by Simon Woolley, Baron Woolley of Woodford
