= Homerton College, Cambridge =

College of the University of Cambridge

Coordinates: 52.1864°N 0.1366°E

Homerton College
- University of Cambridge
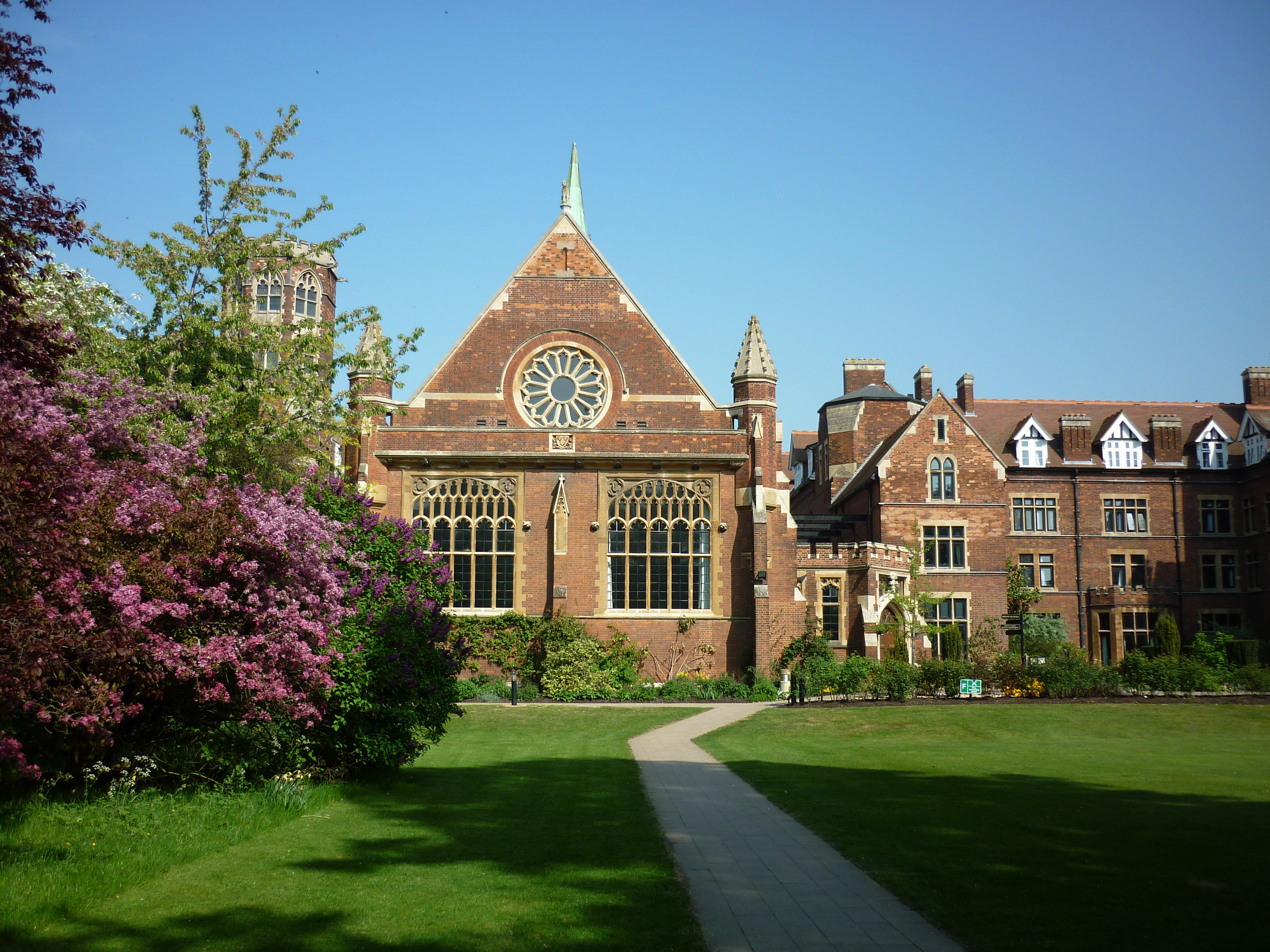
- The Cavendish Building, Homerton College

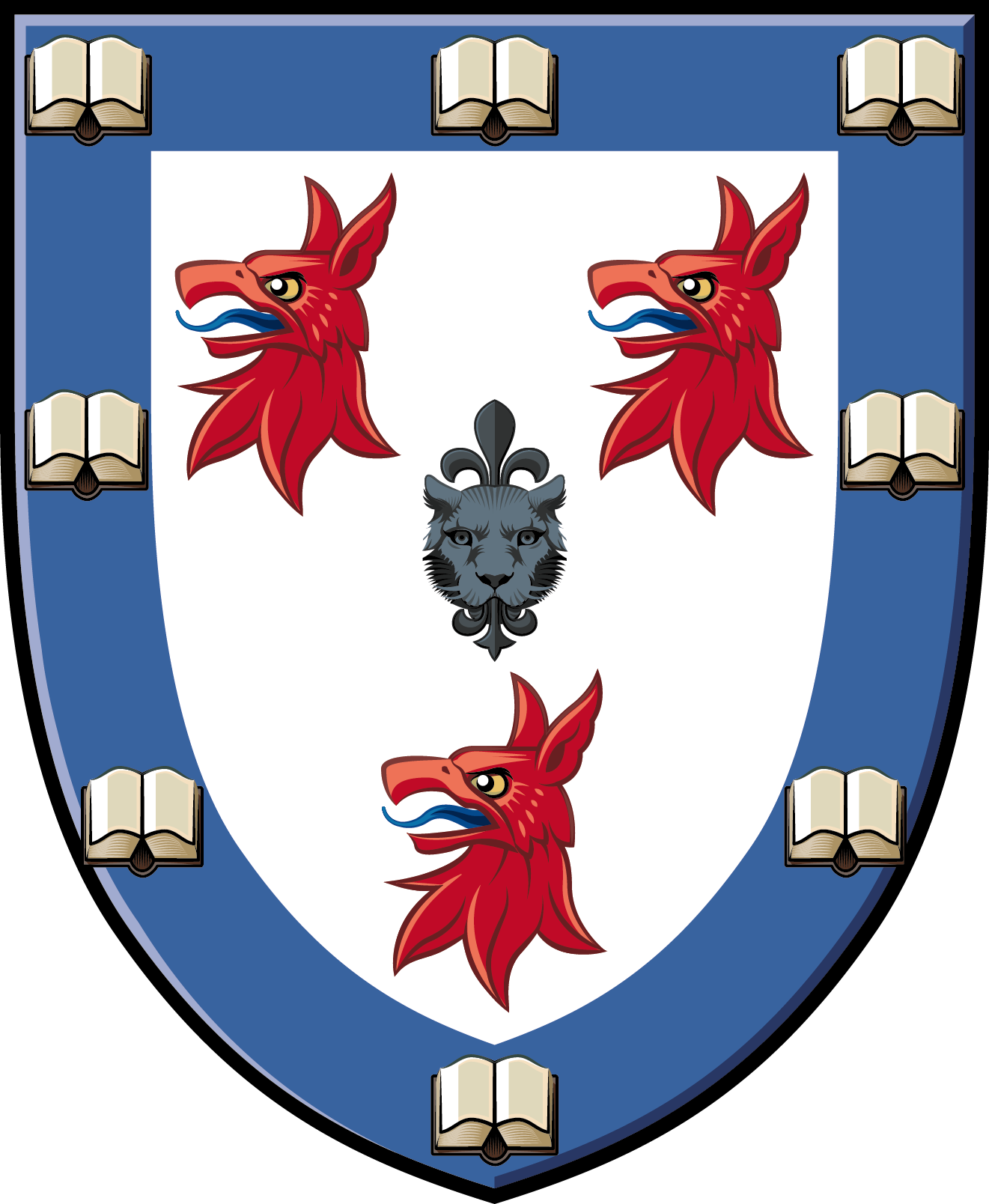
- Arms: Argent, a leopard's face jessant-de-lys sable between three griffins' heads erased gules; on a bordure azure eight open books proper.
Scarf colours: navy, with two equally-spaced narrow white stripes
- Location: Hills Road (map)
- Abbreviation: HO
- Motto: Respice Finem (Latin)
- Motto in English: Look to the end
- Established: 1768
- Named after: Homerton, London, UK
- Former names: Homerton Academy (1768–1852); Training Institution of the Congregational Board of Education (1852–1894)
- Sister colleges: Harris Manchester College, Oxford; Mansfield College, Oxford
- Principal: Lord Woolley of Woodford
- Undergraduates: 618 (2022–23)
- Postgraduates: 746 (2022–23)
- Endowment: £148m (2021)
- Website: homerton.cam.ac.uk
- JCR: hus-jcr.co.uk
- MCR: homerton-mcr.co.uk
- Boat club: Homerton College Boat Club

Map
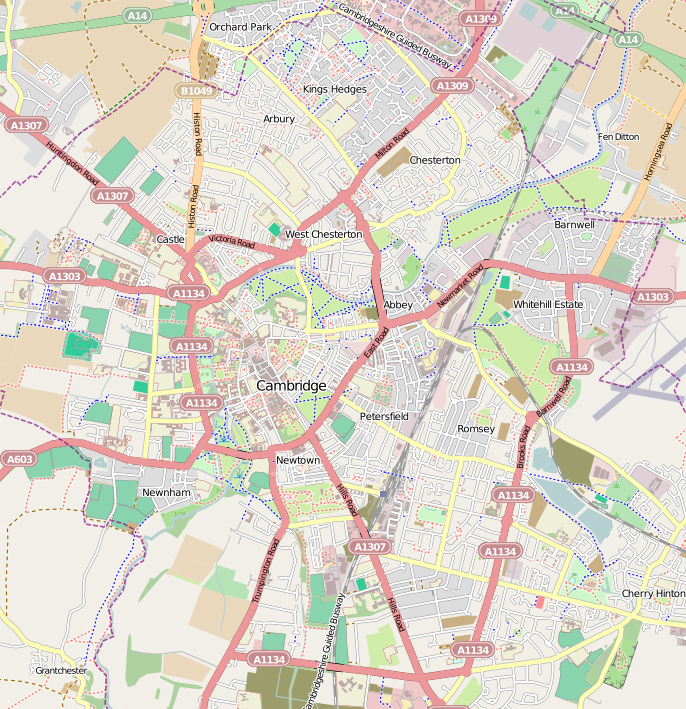
- Location within Cambridge

Homerton College is a constituent college of the University of Cambridge. Its first premises were acquired in Homerton, London in 1768, by an informal gathering of Protestant dissenters with origins in the seventeenth century. In 1894, the college moved from Homerton High Street, Hackney, London, to Cambridge. Homerton was admitted as an "Approved Society" of the university in 1976, and received its Royal charter in 2010, affirming its status as a full college of the university. The college celebrated its 250th anniversary in 2018.

With around 600 undergraduates, 750 postgraduates, and 90 fellows, it has more students than any other Cambridge college but, because only half of those are resident undergraduates, its undergraduate presence is similar to large colleges such as Trinity and St John's. The college has particularly strong ties to public service, as well as academia, having educated many prominent dissenting thinkers, educationalists, politicians, and missionary explorers.

The college has extensive grounds which encompass sports fields, water features and beehives, and the focal point of the college, its Victorian Gothic hall. It also has a wide range of student clubs and societies, including Homerton College Boat Club, Homerton College Music Society and the Homerton College Rugby Football Club.

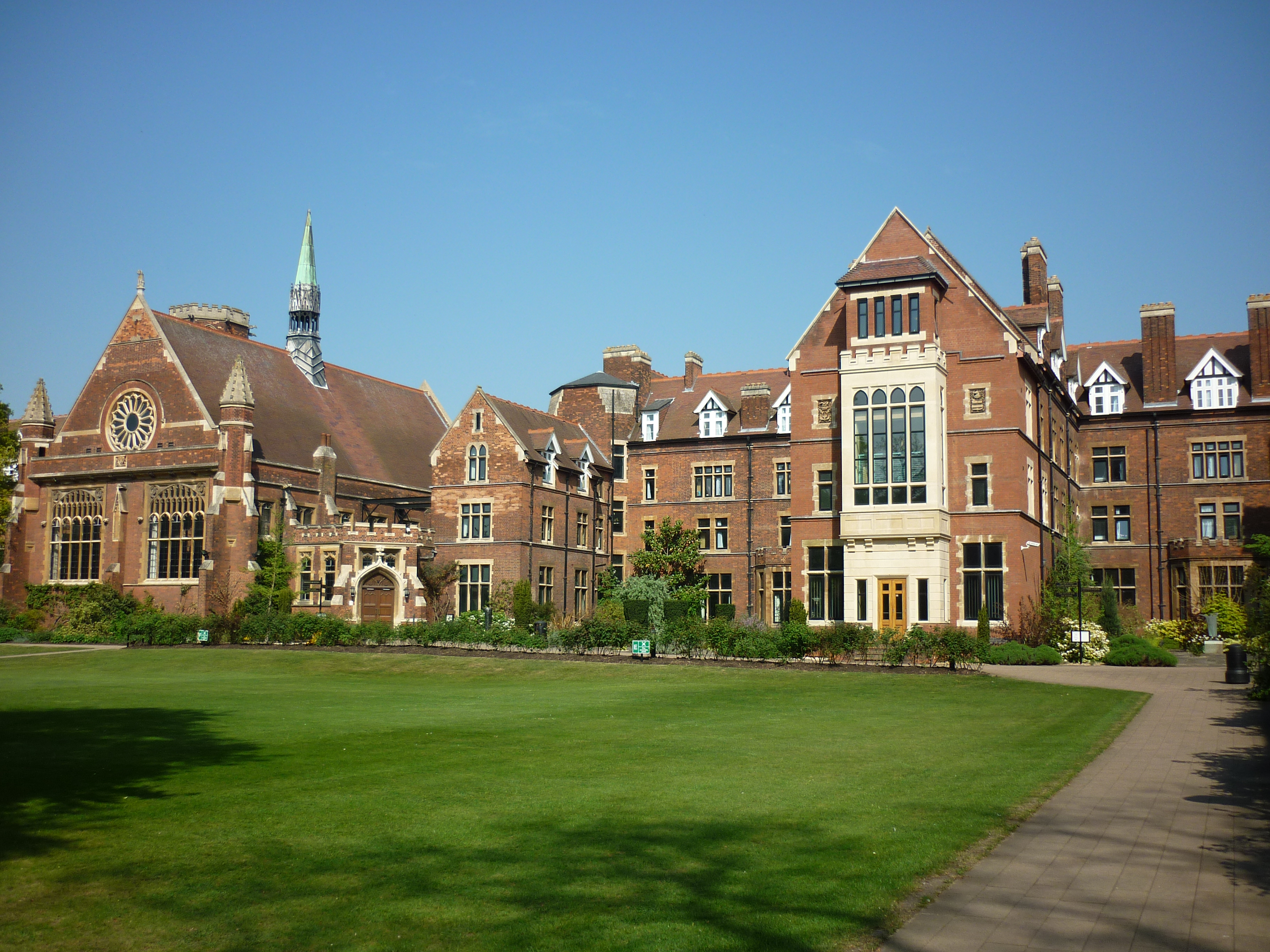
The Cavendish Building.

== History ==
=== Early history ===
The college's origins date back to the seventeenth century. In 1695, a Congregation Fund was created in London to educate Calvinist ministers. As non-conformists, they were barred by law from attending Oxbridge colleges, and so studied a modern curriculum, with particular emphasis on philosophy, science, and modern history. In 1730, a formal society – known as the King's Head Society after the pub at the Royal Exchange where they held their meetings – was founded to sponsor young men to attend dissenting academies. Today, a secret society and discussion club at the college of the same name maintains some of its traditions. By 1768, the Society was large enough to need its own premises, so it purchased a large property in Homerton High Street, in London's East End.

By 1817, the institution had become known as "Homerton Academy Society", later "Homerton College Society". At that time, it produced some of the nation's foremost dissenting figures, many closely involved in the movements opposed to the slave trade and the Corn Laws. For several years, the college was affiliated to the University of London, but when its theological function was moved to New College London in 1850, it was re-founded by the Congregational Board of Education to concentrate on the study of education itself. It did so by transferring its theological courses to New College London, of which the Rev. John Harris DD was the Congregationalist Principal, and by extending and rebuilding the old mansion house and 1820s buildings of the academy, at a cost of £10,000. The college reopened in April 1852 as the Training Institution of the Congregational Board of Education, with Samuel Morley as its treasurer. Shortly afterwards, it began admitting women students. Then Principal John Horobin called an end to mixed education in 1896, shortly after the move to Cambridge, and the college remained all-women for 80 years thereafter.

Towards the end of the century, the growth of industry had turned the village of Homerton into a manufacturing centre, lowering the quality of life of the students and, between 1878 and 1885, there were seven deaths from tuberculosis, smallpox and typhoid. At the same time, increasing numbers of students required more space.

In 1881, former students of Homerton College who were members of Glyn Cricket Club formed a football section to help keep their players fit during the winter months. The football section continued to grow over the ensuing years and is now Leyton Orient Football Club – a fact acknowledged by an annual match between the college's football team and that of the Leyton Orient Supporters Club.

=== Move to Cambridge ===
In 1894, the Congregational Board of Education were able to purchase the estate of Cavendish College, Cambridge (named after the then-Chancellor of the university and not to be confused with Lucy Cavendish College) which had become available. It had been founded to allow poorer students to sit Cambridge tripos exams without the expense of joining a true Cambridge college. It was briefly recognised as a "Public Hostel" of the university in 1882, but a lack of money had brought the venture to an end.

All its estates and furniture were bought for £10,000 by the Congregational Board, and students and staff moved from the old Hackney premises into the vacant college buildings at Cambridge. Initially taking the name of Homerton New College at Cavendish College, it shortly afterwards became just Homerton College, Cambridge. John Charles Horobin became the first Principal: his portrait hangs in the college's Great Hall.

The first woman to head the college was Mary Miller Allan, who was responsible for Homerton's national reputation as a trainer of women teachers. Her successor in 1935 was Miss Alice Skillicorn, a former HMI, who took the college through World War Two, during which time it was bombed. Dame Beryl Paston Brown was Principal in the 1960s, at a time when Homerton's numbers doubled after the introduction of three-year training courses in 1960.

In December 1976, under the headship of Principal Alison Cheveley Shrubsole, Homerton was accepted as an Approved Society of the University of Cambridge following a 3–1 vote of the Regent House in favour of its admission. The possibility of introducing a Cambridge Bachelor of Education (BEd) degree had been given as one of the reasons for the original move into Cambridge. It was after the shake-up and governmental criticisms of teacher training in the early 1970s that the university admitted Homerton because, by then, all of its students were doing four-year honours courses.

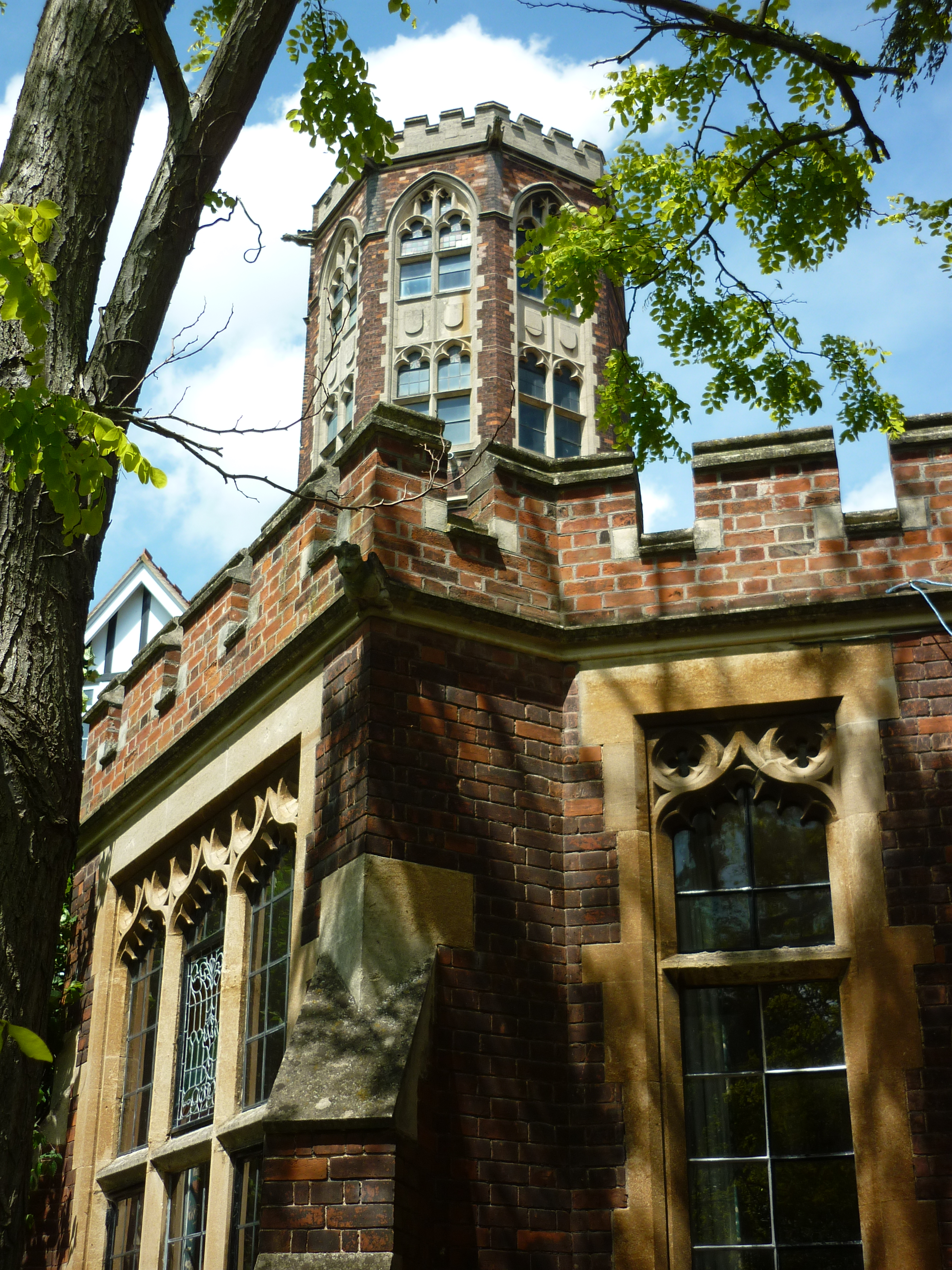
Homerton's Castellated Tower.

In late 2000, the Regent House approved a proposal to "converge" Homerton with the rest of the university. Convergence involved the transfer of most of the college's teaching and research activity to the new University of Cambridge Faculty of Education and the diversification of the college into a wide range of Tripos subjects. In September 2001, Homerton admitted its first non-education Tripos students. At the same time the old BEd degree was retired in favour of a three-year B.A. in education, followed by a one-year Post Graduate Certificate of Education.

At the time of convergence, it was envisaged that Homerton would move from the status of Approved Society to that of Approved Foundation or full college. In December 2008 Homerton's application to move to full college status was approved by the University Council. The change in status was completed with the grant of a Royal Charter on 11 March 2010.

== Buildings and grounds ==
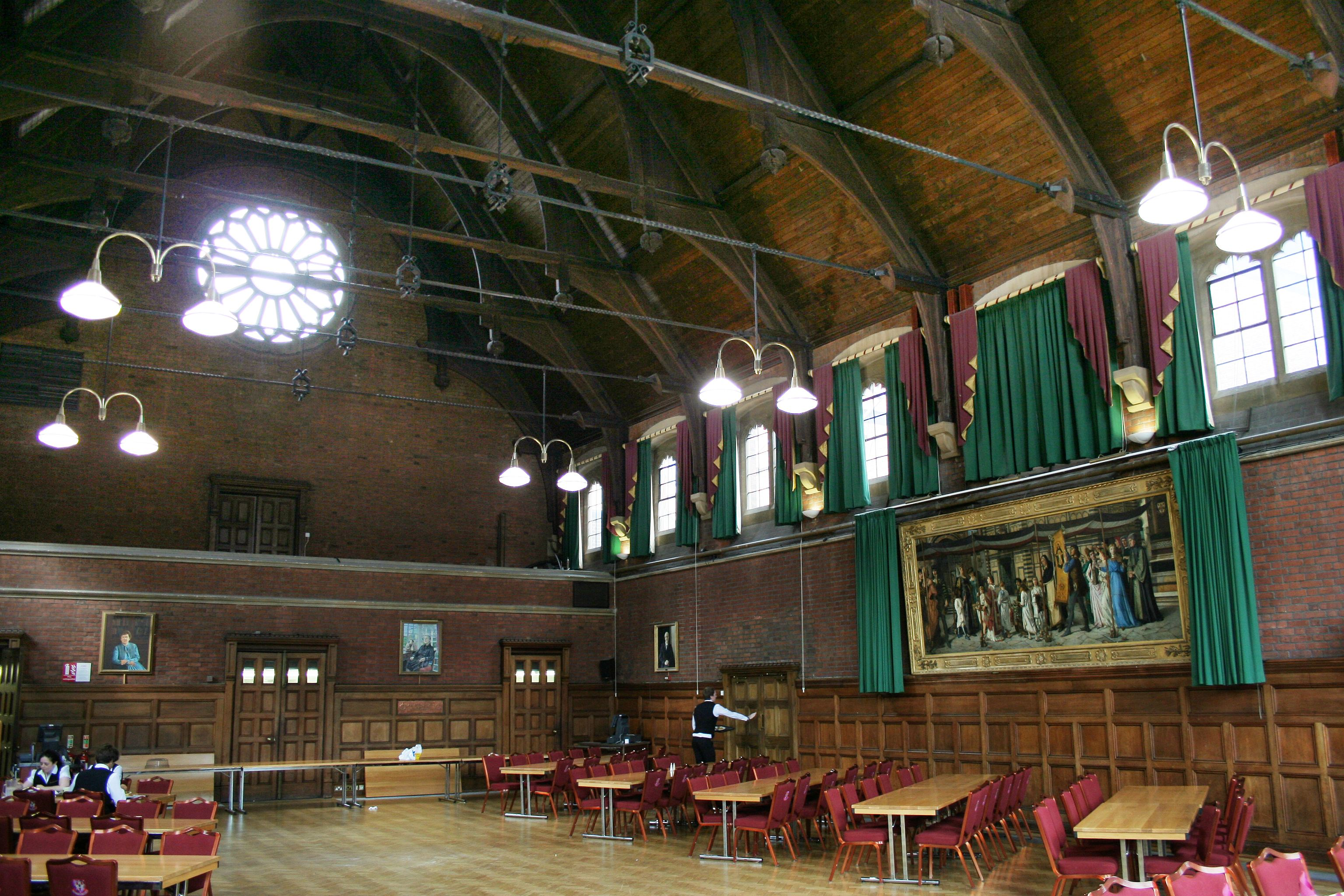
The Great Hall (1889) with Jane Benham Hay's 'The Florentine Procession' on display.

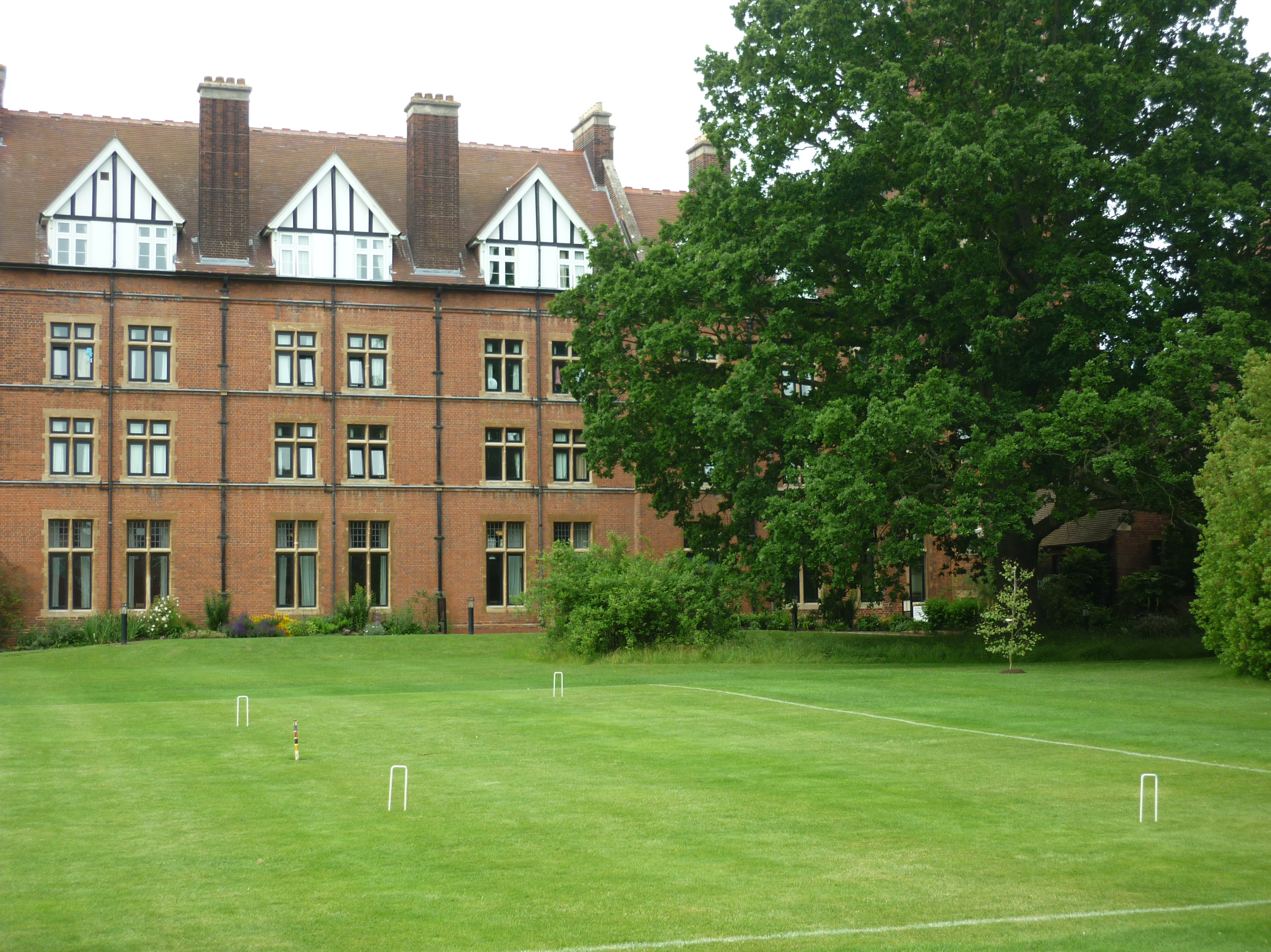
The college croquet lawn in summer

The original Victorian Cavendish College buildings were constructed in 1876 in the Gothic Revival style, using a combination of red Suffolk brick and Bath stone dressings. One of the most notable features is an oak doorway with an ogee arch flanked above by ornamental grotesques. Several years later, the Cambridge architect William Wren designed additions to the eastern end of the college buildings in the Neo-Gothic style – now occupied by the Principal's office. The castellated tower is the tallest part of the original college buildings, and it is possible to see the spires of Ely Cathedral on a clear day from its uppermost floor.

When it was built in 1889, the Great Hall was the largest college hall in Cambridge. It now houses one of the college's most notable works of art – the Pre-Raphaelite piece by Jane Benham Hay known as 'The Florentine Procession', painted in the 1860s and winning 'Picture of the Year' in the 1867 Saturday Review. Encircling the Hall are portraits of former Principals of the college.

The Hall features a hammer-beam roof, American walnut panelling, a gallery, rose windows, a fleche, and a bell originating from the old college in London which sounds before the College Grace is read at Formal dinner. A new dining hall was designed by Feilden Fowles and opened in 2022; Rowan Moore named it as one of his five best buildings of the year.

Other notable buildings of the college include the Ibberson Building, built in 1914, and named after its architect Herbert George Ibberson. It is considered to be the college's most significant building; with Grade Two listed status, the only listed building on the site. An example of arts and crafts architecture, its present-day Combination Room was probably the only grade two listed gymnasium in the world. Trumpington House, completed in 1847 and which once held the college's wine collection in its basement, was built in the style of classical revival and is currently leased to the Faculty of Education. Additionally, there is a science education centre named in honour of John Hammond, who campaigned for the college to receive its Royal Charter.

Homerton's library includes thousands of books covering numerous academic disciplines. Unique to Homerton, however, is a children's book collection, which contains early editions of many famous books from 1780 onwards.

Homerton has more green space around its buildings than many other Cambridge colleges. In its grounds are several rare examples of wild orchids and over 150 species of plants, which act as a rich habitat for various forms of wildlife – including grey squirrels, carrion crows, woodpeckers, stock doves, rabbits, the 'College fox', and in the summer a small colony of swifts, which nest under the eaves of the roof of the Cavendish building after their return from Africa. There is also a large orchard, where students relax in warm weather.

=== Accommodation ===
Like the majority of Cambridge colleges, Homerton offers on-site accommodation for its students for all three years. This is provided primarily by five purpose-built accommodation buildings: East House, West House, South Court, Harrison House and Morley House. Harrison House and Morley House exclusively house graduate students and fellows; Harrison was opened in November 2006, and Morley in 2016. Harrison is named after Sir David Harrison. Other accommodation is provided in the ABC and D&E blocks, both part of the main college buildings, as well as in Queen's Wing (opened by Queen Elizabeth the Queen Mother in 1957) which also contains the Homerton Union of Students and both the Undergraduate and Graduate Common Rooms.

Outside of university terms, the accommodation attracts extensive use for conference purposes.

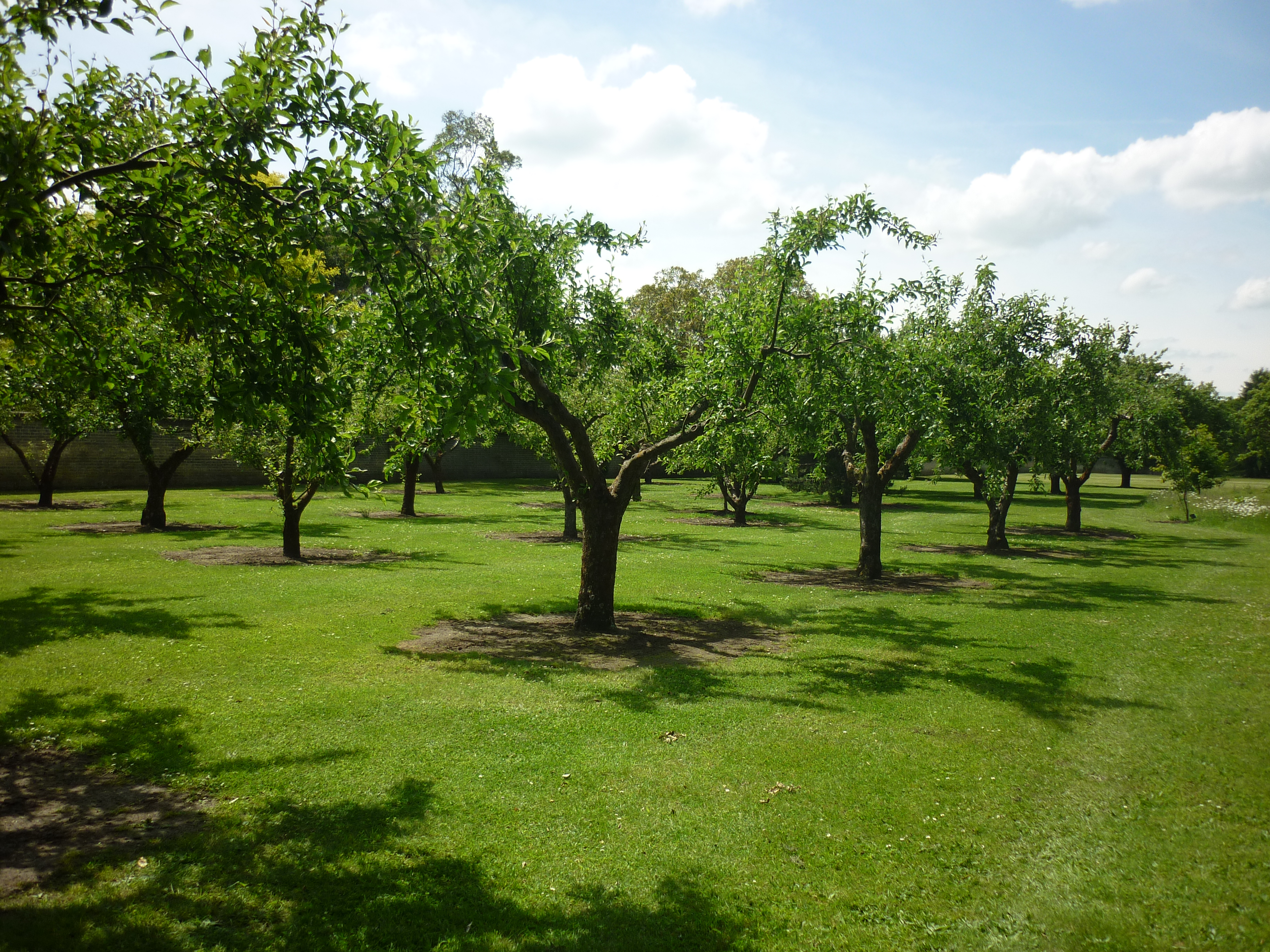
The college orchard

== Student life ==
=== Traditions ===
Homerton has several unique traditions. At its Matriculation Dinner new undergraduates are made to form two lines and drink wine from the 'Homerton Horn' – an African cow horn with silver mounts, whilst speaking several Anglo-Saxon phrases to one another (including the greeting "Wassail!", and the response "Frith and Freondship sae th'y'" – 'peace and friendship be with you'). In recent years, the tradition has been adapted so that undergraduates say these Anglo-Saxon phrases to the person sat across from them on the table, and take subsequent drinks from their own glasses, rather than every undergraduate drinking from the ceremonial horn, which has historically resulted in epidemics of 'Freshers Flu'.

Because the college was all-female for much of its history, the design of the college gown is that of those traditionally worn by female undergraduates in early twentieth century Cambridge (this is shared by all the historically female colleges: Girton, Newnham, and Murray Edwards). The gown is based on the original Cambridge black gown, still worn by undergraduates at Peterhouse, but has the slits in the sleeves closed up. As a homage to its all-female origins, or simply because the college has never had one re-designed, this gown is now worn by all undergraduates at the college regardless of sex.

=== Homerton Union of Students ===
The Homerton Union of Students is one of the most active student unions in the university. The President – the only paid, sabbatical Presidency of all the Cambridge colleges – manages, along with a Vice-president Internal and a Vice President External, a team of students on the executive committee and a team of 'Liberation officers'. Together, they organise 'Freshers Week'. Homerton's Fresher's week is longer than in most colleges, where students only have two to three days of 'Freshers week' before the start of term. They also organise events throughout the year for students, as well as offer pastoral support.

From 2013 until 2020 the HUS organized an annual and immensely popular Harry Potter Formal Hall, at which students and staff would dress as characters from the books, sketches would be acted, and live owls were brought in for entertainment. Formal halls were suspended in 2021 owing to the COVID-19 pandemic, but returned in 2022. Homerton's Harry Potter Formal Halls were discontinued in 2023 when an incoming HUS president allegedly objected to their connection with J. K. Rowling and her gender critical views.

=== May Ball ===
The college holds an annual May Ball in Cambridge. In 2018, the ball was attended by over 1500 guests, the largest ever hosted on Homerton's grounds, to celebrate the college's 250th anniversary.

=== Homerton Charter Choir ===
The college's Charter Choir sing evensong every Tuesday and is formed of choral scholars and volunteers from the college and the wider community. The choir tours abroad once a year, recently travelling to Portsmouth, Gibraltar and Iceland. The choir is directed by Daniel Trocmé-Latter, the music director of studies at the college.

=== Boat Club ===
Homerton College Boat Club (HCBC) is the rowing club of the college. HCBC colours are navy blue with white trim, although the club's Zephyr (garment) is white with blue trim. The blade colour is white with a single blue (RAL-290-20-30) vertical stripe. It is traditional to wear a sock of each of the boat club's colours when racing with a blue sock on the foot opposite the rigger.

The Men's 1st VIII hold the Oxbridge record for the most places advanced during one series of bumps (either Mays, Lents, or Torpids/Eights for Oxford), advancing 13 places in the May Bumps 2001, where the crew moved up a division to division 3 and also won blades.

=== Widening participation ===
In 2022, Homerton made offers to five students, who are among more than 50 candidates from backgrounds of educational disadvantage to be offered a place on the University of Cambridge's first-ever pre-degree foundation year.

== People associated with Homerton ==
Principals, treasurers, fellows (including honorary fellows) or students who studied at Homerton Academy or Homerton College before and after it officially became part of Cambridge University. Graduates of the college are collectively known as Homertonians.

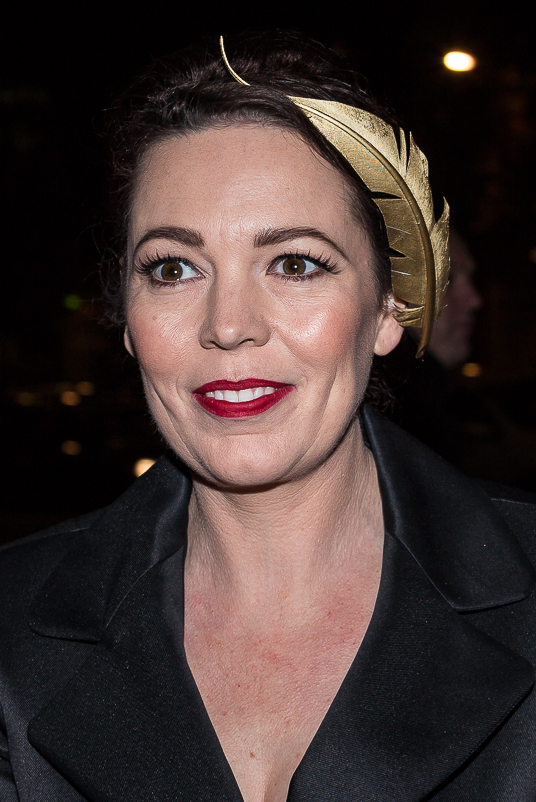
Olivia Colman, English actress. (Matriculated; did not graduate)

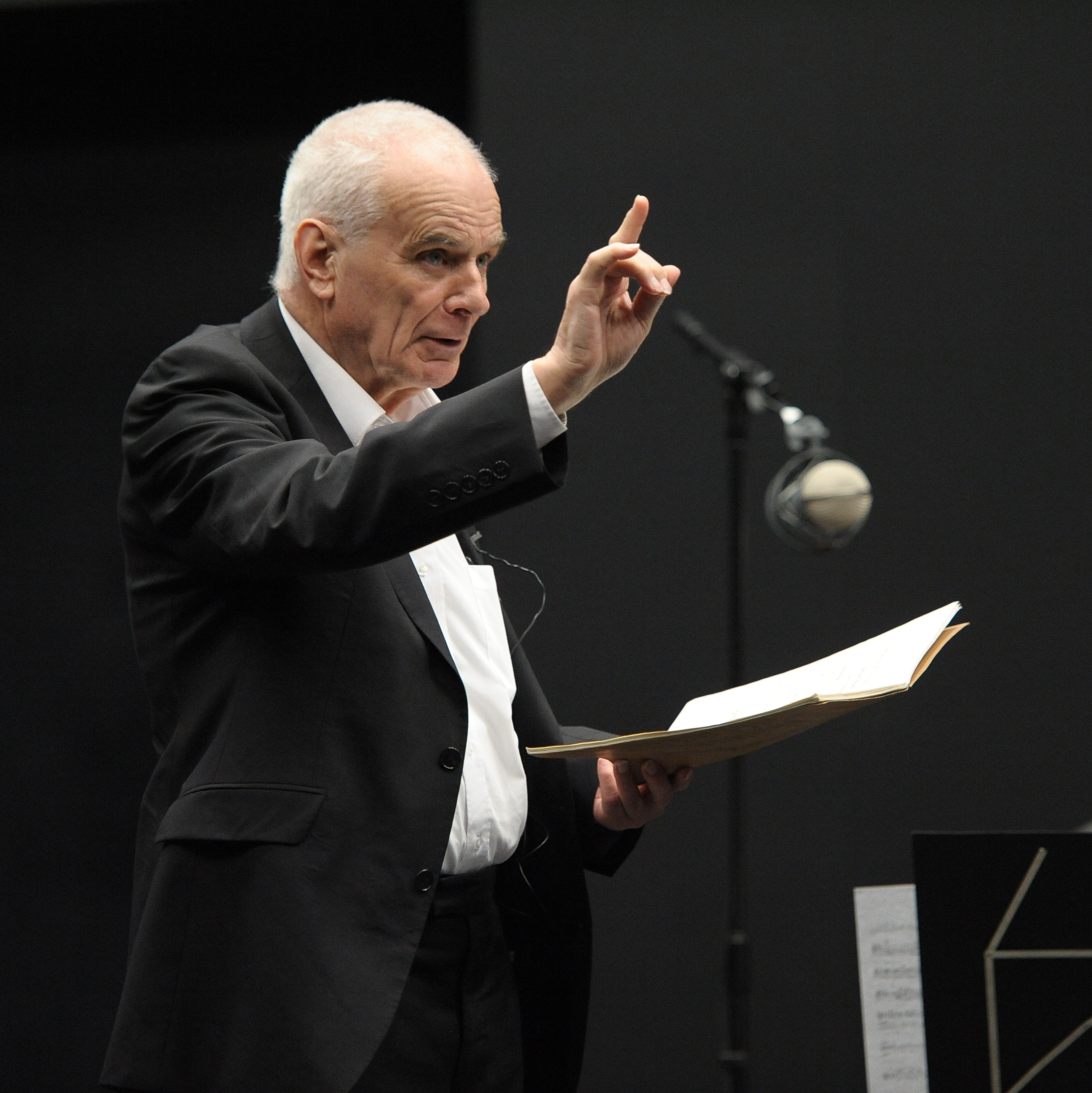
Sir Peter Maxwell Davies, Honorary Fellow. English composer and conductor; Master of the Queen's Music.

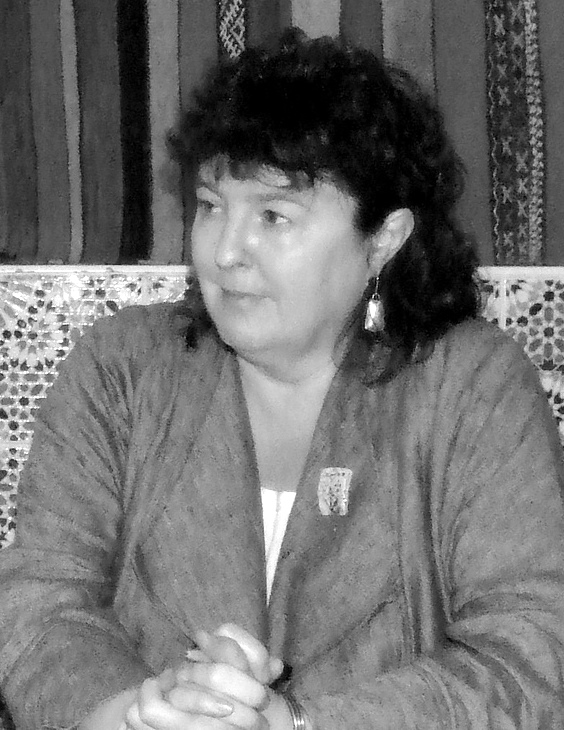
Dame Carol Ann Duffy, Honorary Fellow. British poet and playwright; Poet laureate from 2009 to 2019

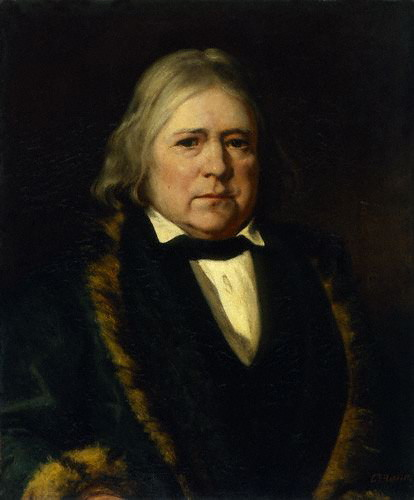
William Johnson Fox, English religious and political orator.

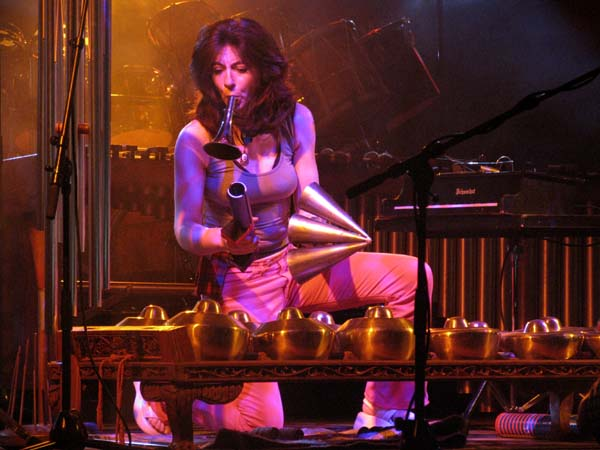
Dame Evelyn Glennie, Honorary Fellow. Scottish virtuoso multi-percussionist.

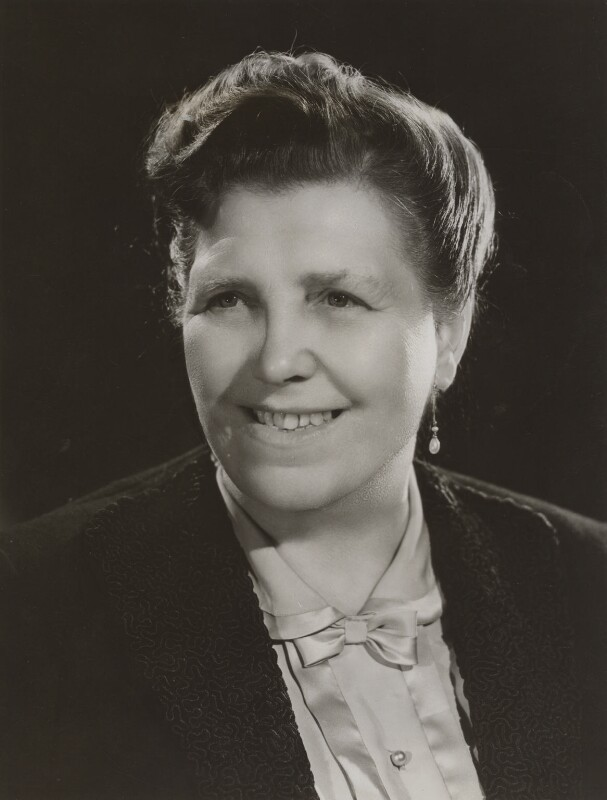
Leah Manning, British educationalist, social reformer, and Member of Parliament (MP).

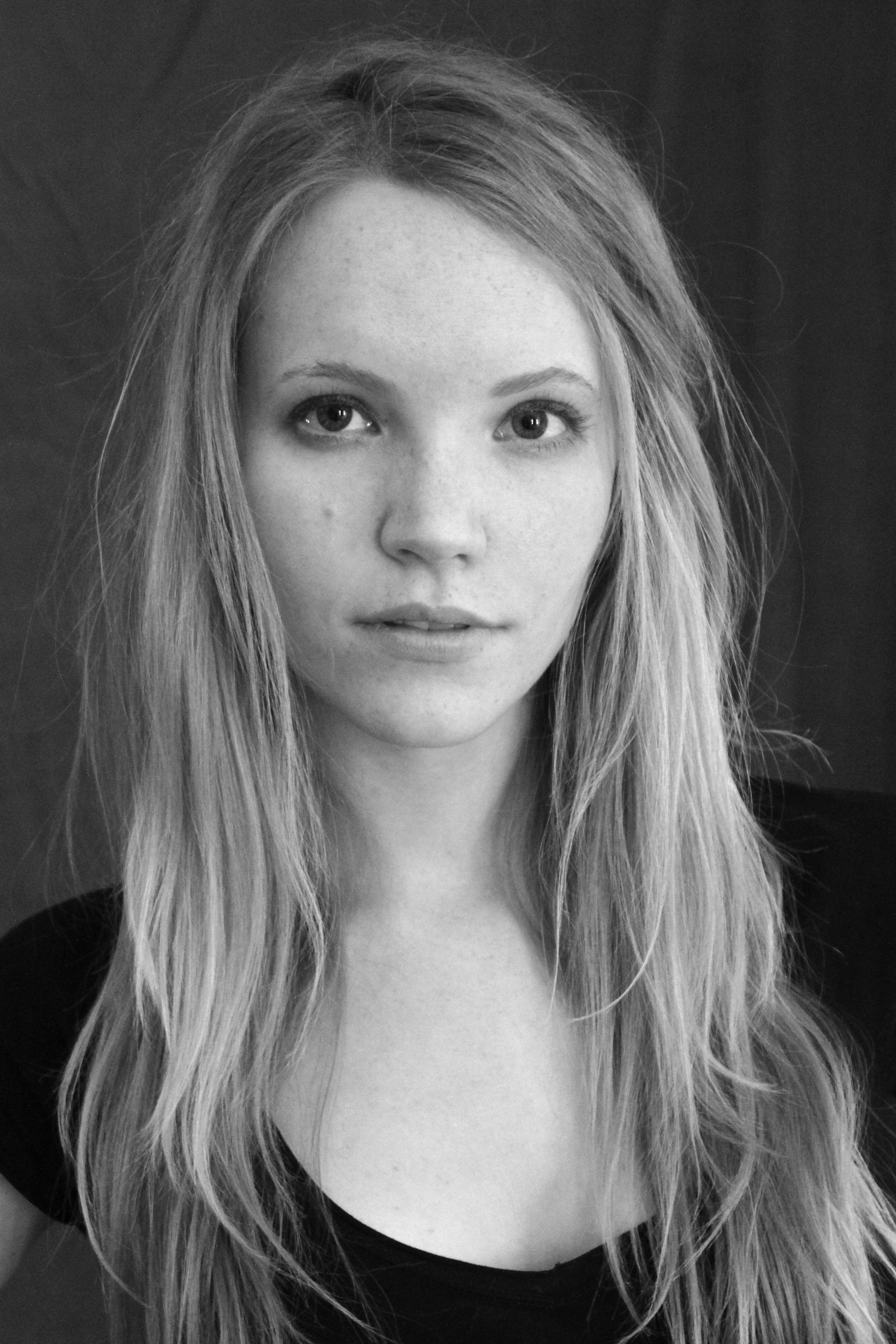
Tamzin Merchant, English actress.

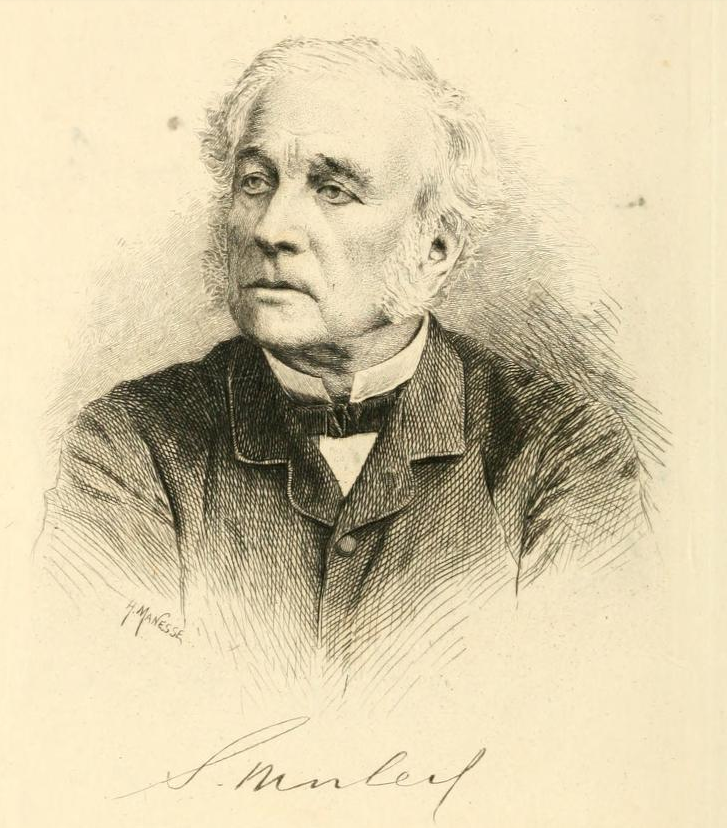
Samuel Morley (MP), English manufacturer, philanthropist, dissenter, abolitionist, political radical, and statesman.

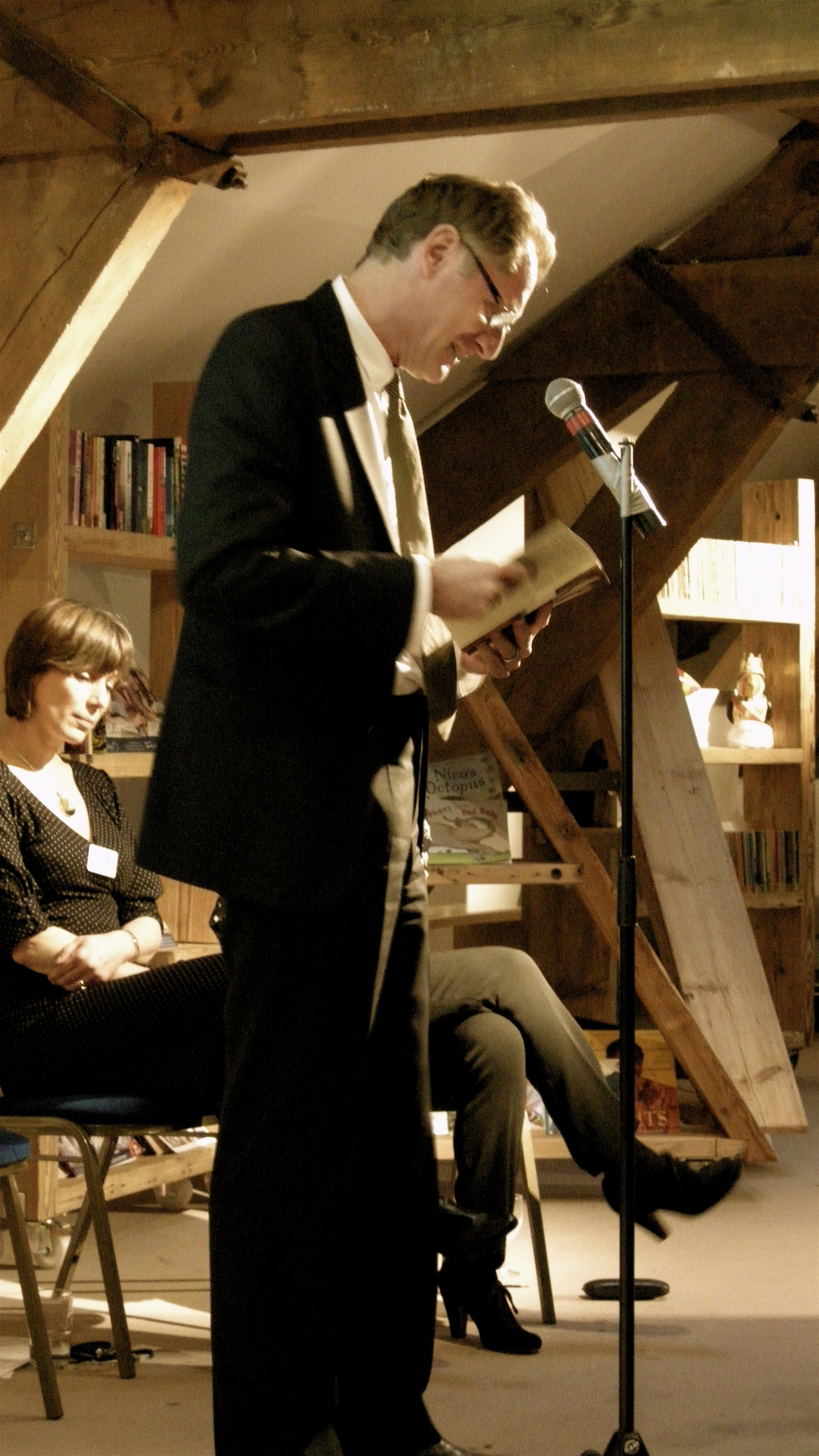
Sir Andrew Motion, Honorary Fellow. English poet, novelist, and biographer; Poet laureate from 1999 to May 2009.

Name	Birth	Death	Career
John Conder	1714	1781	Independent minister and tutor.
Daniel Fisher	1731	1807	Dissenting minister and tutor.
Henry Mayo	1733	1793	Independent minister and editor of The London Magazine. Samuel Johnson's adversary and "literary anvil" according to his biographer James Boswell.
John Fell	1735	1797	Congregationalist minister and classical tutor.
Samuel Blatchford	1767	1828	First President of the Rensselaer Polytechnic Institute, the oldest technological university in the English-speaking world.
John Pye-Smith	1774	1851	Congregational theologian, author, and tutor, associated with reconciling geological sciences with the Bible, repealing the Corn Laws and abolishing slavery.
Ezekiel Blomfield	1778	1818	Congregational minister, influential author and compiler of religious works and works on natural history.
William Johnson Fox	1786	1864	English religious and political orator.
William Ellis	1794	1872	English missionary, traveller, geographer, and ethnographer.
Edward Stallybrass	1794	1884	British missionary to the Buryat people of Siberia; translator of the Bible into Mongolian.
Robert Halley	1796	1876	English Congregationalist minister and abolitionist. He was noted for his association with the politics of Repeal of the Corn Laws, and became Classical Tutor at Highbury College and Principal of New College London.
William Jacobson	1803	1884	Regius Professor of Divinity at University of Oxford (1848–1865), Vice-Principal of Magdalen Hall (later Hertford College, Oxford) (1832) and Bishop of Chester (1865–1884).
Samuel Dyer	1804	1843	British Protestant missionary to China, pioneering typographer and translator of the Bible into Chinese.
Robert Cotton Mather	1808	1877	English missionary, author, and translator in India.
Samuel Morley	1809	1886	English manufacturer, philanthropist, dissenter, abolitionist, political radical, and statesman.
Leah Manning	1886	1977	British educationalist, social reformer, and Labour Member of Parliament (MP). Organised the evacuation of Basque children during the Spanish Civil War.
Betty Rea	1905	1965	English sculptor and educationalist.
Dora Jessie Saint	1913	2012	Best known by her pen name "Miss Read"; English novelist and schoolmistress.
Efua Sutherland	1924	1996	Ghanaian playwright, children's author, and dramatist. Founder of the Ghana Drama Studio, the Ghana Society of Writers, and the Ghana Experimental Theatre.
Julie Covington	1946		English singer and actress, best known for recording the original version of "Don't Cry for Me Argentina".
John Hopkins	1949		British composer.
Cherie Lunghi	1952		English film, television, and theatre actress.
Tony Little	1954		British schoolmaster, former head of Chigwell School and Oakham School before becoming headmaster of Eton College in 2002.
Jan Ravens	1958		English actress and impressionist, first female president of the Cambridge University Footlights Dramatic Club (Footlights).
Nick Hancock	1962		English actor and television presenter; former presenter of Room 101.
Olivia Colman	1974		Academy Award and BAFTA Award-winning English actress.
Benjamin Caron	1976		Multi-BAFTA, Emmy and Golden Globe winning Director.
Sam Yates	1983		Award-winning English director.
Tamzin Merchant	1987		English actress; best known for her roles in the 2005 film Pride & Prejudice and television series The Tudors.
Henry Fieldman	1988		British rower, two-time world champion and Olympic athlete.
Liam Williams	1988		British comedian and writer.
Olivia Coffey	1989		American rower, three-time world champion and Olympic athlete.
Kiran Millwood Hargrave	1990		British poet and novelist.

=== Principals ===
A list of Homerton principals since the college moved to Cambridge in 1894:

Principal	Tenure
John Charles Horobin	1894–1902
Mary Miller Allan	1903–1935
Alice Havergal Skillicorn	1935–1960
Dame Beryl Paston Brown	1961–1971
Alison Cheveley Shrubsole	1971–1985
Alan George Bamford	1985–1991
Kate Pretty	1991–2013
Geoff Ward	2013–2021
Simon Woolley, Baron Woolley of Woodford	2021–present
