= Alice Skillicorn =

Former college principal

Havergal Skillicorn
- Born: 1894; Ramsey, Isle of Man
- Died: 3 February 1979 (aged 84–85)
- Occupation(s): Educator, college administrator
- Known for: Principal, Homerton College, Cambridge (1935–1960)

Alice Havergal Skillicorn CBE (1894 – 3 February 1979) was a Manx academic. From 1935 to 1960, she was Principal of Homerton College, Cambridge.

== Biography ==
Skillicorn was born in Ramsey, Isle of Man, the daughter of Edward Skillicorn and Alice Kelly Goldsmith. Her father was a shoemaker, and her mother was a baker and confectioner. She earned a teaching certificate in 1916 and studied at the London School of Economics.

Skillicorn taught in London and Durham. She was an HMI from 1928 until her appointment at Homerton in 1935, succeeding Mary Allan. She retired from Homerton College in 1960, to be succeeded by Beryl Paston Brown.

Skillicorn lived on campus during the week, but also shared a house in Cambridge with her partner, fellow educator Dorothy Sergeant. Sergeant died in 1969, and Skillicorn died on 3 February 1979. Homerton College owns a portrait of Skillcorn, painted by Henry Lamb in 1953. Skillicorn Gates, " a set of handsome wrought-iron gates" installed on the campus of Homerton College in 1956, were designed by Molly Harrison and funded by alumnae in her honor.

Academic offices
Preceded by Mary Miller Allan	Principal of Homerton College, Cambridge; 1935–1960	Succeeded by Beryl Paston Brown
