= Robert Cotton Mather =

English missionary in India

Robert Cotton Mather (1808–1877) was an English missionary in India.

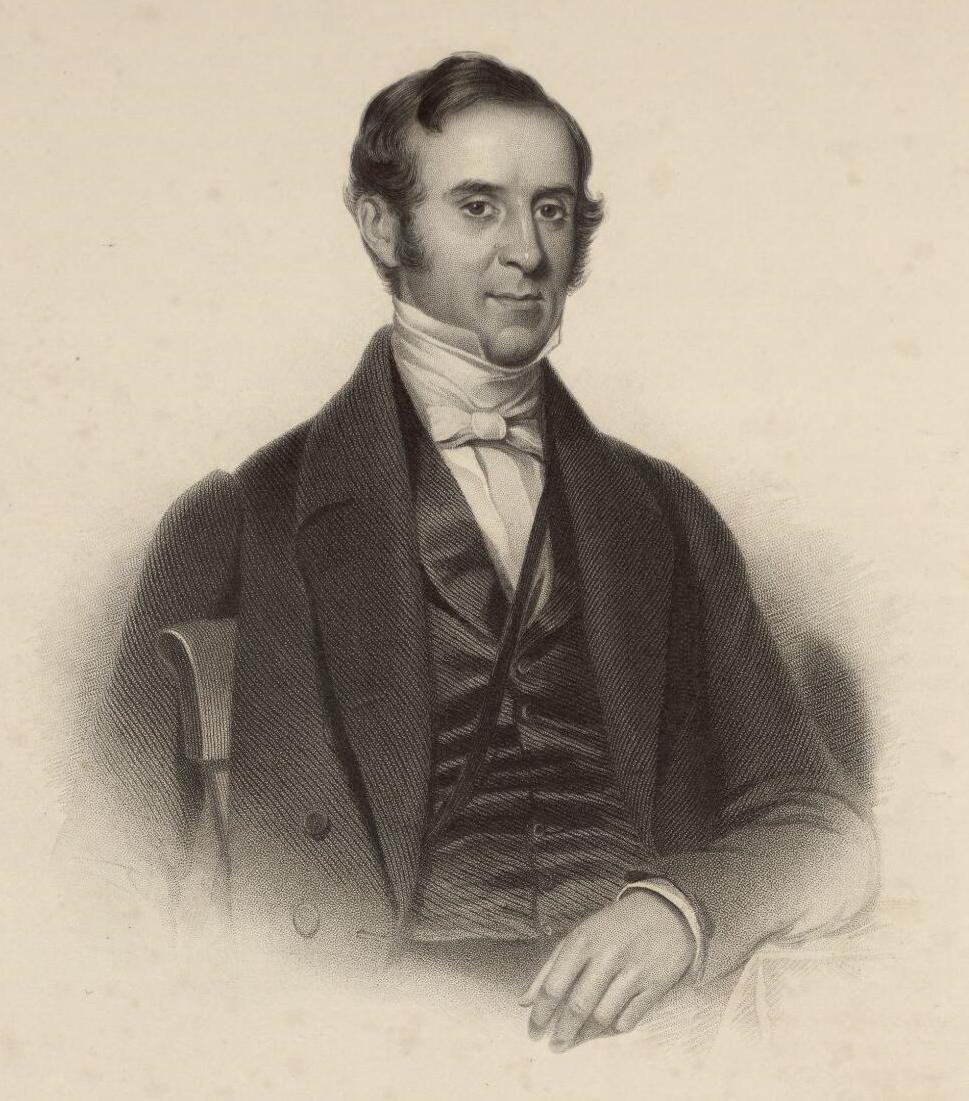
Robert Cotton Mather, engraving by John Cochran after Henry Room

== Life ==
The son of James Mather, a congregational minister, he was born at New Windsor, Manchester, on 8 November 1808, and educated at Edinburgh and Glasgow universities, and Homerton College. After his ordination at Lendal Chapel, York, on 1 June 1833, he went to India as an agent of the London Missionary Society.

Mather had the pastorate of the Union Chapel, Calcutta, for a few months, then moved to Benares, where he remained until May 1838. He settled at Mirzapur. There, he established a new mission, and over time, gathered a Christian community, built schools and churches, founded the orphan school press, started and edited a monthly journal in Hindustani, preached in the languages of Northern India, and was a member of various missionary associations in India.

Mather returned to England in 1873, after forty years' work in India. At the time of his death, which took place at Torrington Park, Finchley, London, on 21 April 1877, he was engaged on a commentary on the Old Testament in the same language.

== Works ==
Cotton revised and edited the entire Bible in Hindustani, and in recognition of this work the University of Glasgow conferred on him the degree of LL.D. in 1862. He also wrote tracts in Hindi and Urdu, and among his English writings is Christian Missions in India, London, 1858. He edited Matthew Atmore Sherring's Indian Church during the Great Rebellion, 1859. In England he published a commentary on the New Testament in Hindustani.

== Family ==
Mather's wife Elizabeth, née Sewell, had been a church member of Hew Court Chapel, Carey Street, London. She published a Hindustani dictionary of the Bible. After Mather's death she joined the female mission at Mirzapur, and died 29 March 1879. Their youngest son, C. B. Mather, went as medical missionary to East Africa. Their daughter Margaret married Matthew Atmore Sherring.

== Notes ==
Attribution

This article incorporates text from a publication now in the public domain: "Mather, Robert Cotton". Dictionary of National Biography. London: Smith, Elder & Co. 1885–1900.
