= Jack Corliss =

American geochemical oceanographer

John B. ("Jack") Corliss is a scientist who has worked in the fields of geology, oceanography, and the origins of life.

Corliss is a University of California, San Diego Alumnus, receiving his PhD from Scripps Institution of Oceanography in the 1960s. As part of his doctoral work under Tjeerd van Andel, he analyzed samples of basaltic rock from the Mid-Atlantic Ridge. Chemical traces in these rocks showed evidence of hot water circulation, suggesting the existence of undersea hot springs known as hydrothermal vents.

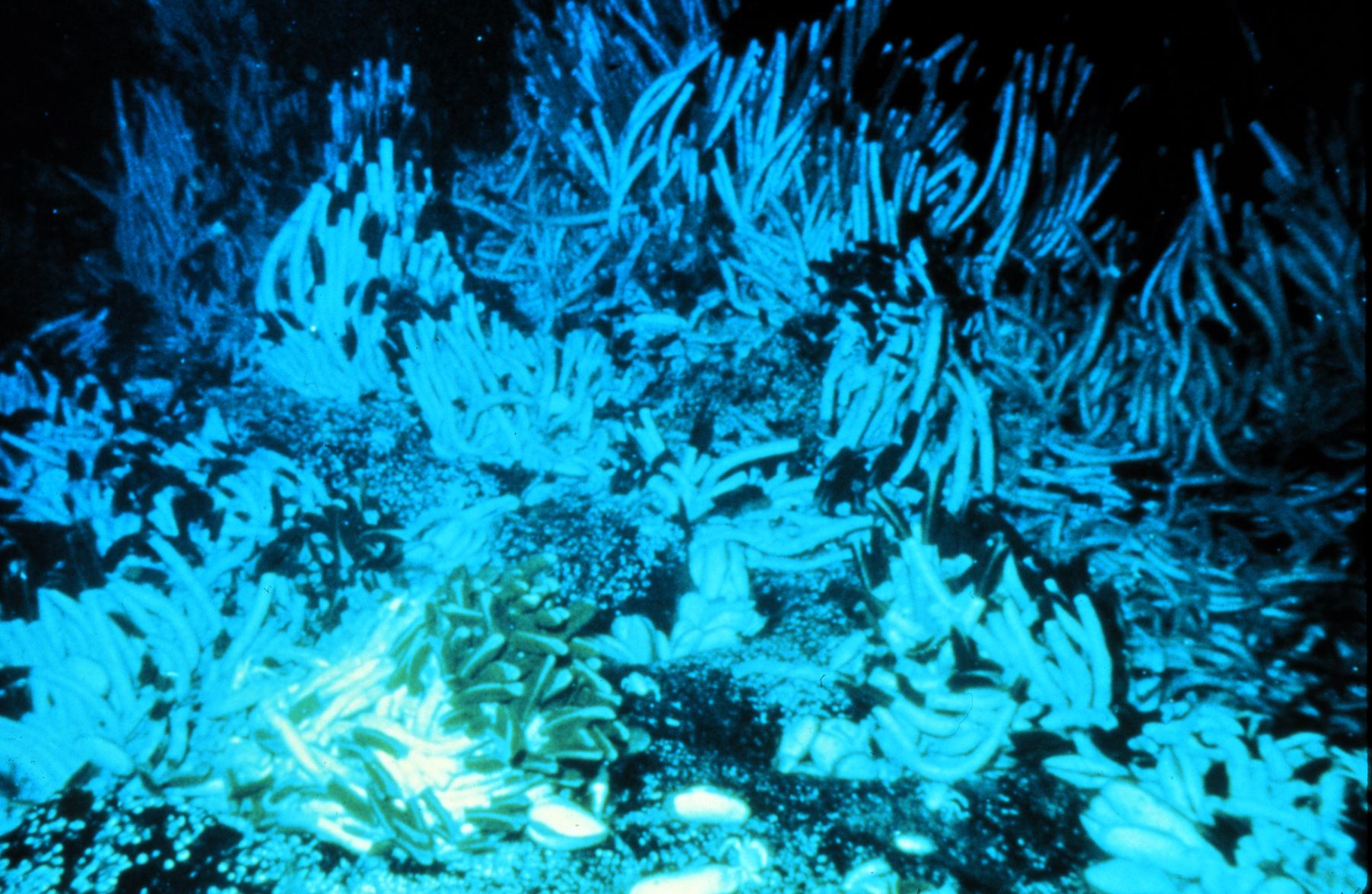
Tube worms around an undersea hydrothermal vent

Following the completion of his PhD, Corliss became a researcher at Oregon State University. In 1977, Corliss, Richard von Herzen, and Robert Ballard led a project using the DSV Alvin submersible to look for the presumed hydrothermal vents near the Galápagos Islands. Corliss, Tjeerd van Andel, and pilot Jack Donnelly were the crew of the Alvin to first discover the vents and the unexpected community of living creatures including giant tube worms, clams and shrimp around them.

The discovery of the hydrothermal vent ecosystems caused Corliss to significantly shift his research, from geochemistry to the origins of life. He proposed that the earliest life on Earth began in deep sea vents. In 1981, he, John Baross, and Sarah Hoffman published a paper entitled "An Hypothesis Concerning the Relationship Between Submarine Hot Springs and the Origin of Life on Earth." In 1983, he moved to Budapest to continue working independently on this hypothesis.

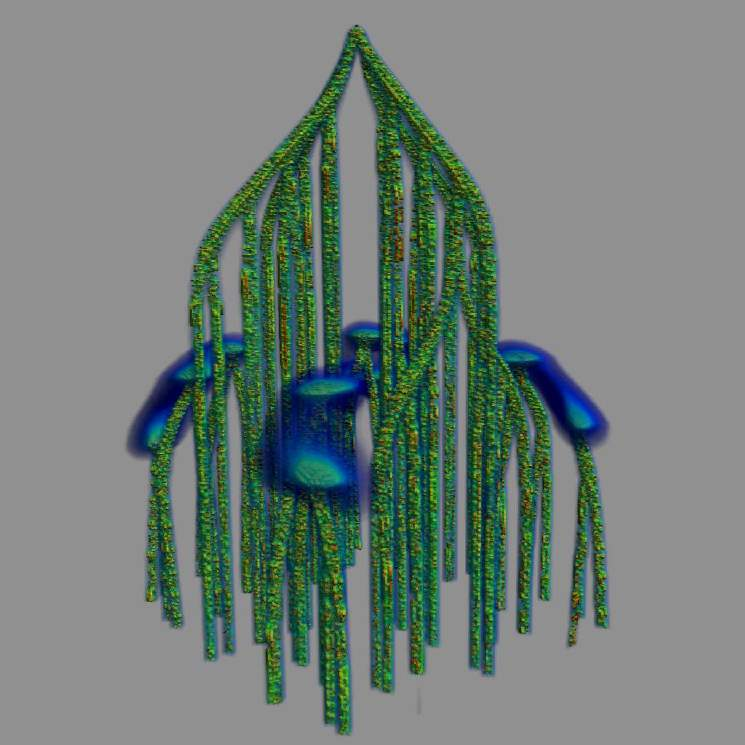
Corliss' CA model of evolution. Vertical axis represents time, horizontal axes represent speciation.

In 1988, Corliss joined the NASA Goddard Space Flight Center's high-performance computing division. There he began using massively parallel computers (the Goodyear MPP and later MasPar MP-1) for cellular automata simulations of evolutionary systems. In 1993, he became director of research at Biosphere 2 in Arizona. He was hired to bring rigor and openness to the project, following conflicts that had resulted in the mass resignation of the project's scientific advisory board.

In 1996, he returned to Budapest to teach biology, at the Central European University.

His daughter Julie Corliss is a medical science writer.
