= Katherine Jones, Viscountess Ranelagh =

17th-century Anglo-Irish scientist

Katherine Jones Viscountess Ranelagh
- Born: 22 March 1615; Youghal, Ireland
- Died: 23 December 1691 (aged 76)
- Resting place: St Martin-in-the-Fields, London
- Other names: Katherine Boyle; Lady Ranelagh
- Known for: Scientist
- Spouse: Arthur Jones
- Children: 4
- Scientific career
- Fields: Medicine

Katherine Jones, Viscountess Ranelagh (22 March 1615 – 23 December 1691), also known as Lady Ranelagh, was an Anglo-Irish scientist in seventeenth-century Ireland and England. She was also a political and religious philosopher, and a member of many intellectual circles including the Hartlib Circle, the Great Tew Circle, and the Invisible College. Her correspondents included Samuel Hartlib, Edward Hyde, William Laud (the Archbishop of Canterbury), Thomas Hyde, and John Milton. She was the sister of Robert Boyle and is thought to have been a great influence on his work in chemistry. In her own right, she was a political and social figure closely connected to the Hartlib Circle. Lady Ranelagh held a London salon during the 1650s, much frequented by virtuosi associated with Hartlib.

== Early life and marriage ==
External audio
- "The Almost Forgotten Story of Katherine Jones, Lady Ranelagh", Distillations Podcast, Science History Institute

Katherine Boyle was born in New College House on Emmet Street in Youghal, Ireland, to Catherine Fenton and Richard Boyle, the first Earl of Cork, on 22 March 1615. She was the seventh child of fifteen. Her siblings included the scientist, Robert Boyle, and the spiritual diarist Mary Rich, later Countess of Warwick. It is not clear how much education she received, although it is known that her brothers received an extensive education. She may have been tutored privately by the family chaplains and received an education in religion and manners. As a wealthy man, her father made sure that his sons were well educated and that he secured politically advantageous marriages for his daughters.

When Jones was nine and a half years old, she moved in with the Beaumont family because she was to be wedded to one of their sons, Sapcott Beaumont. When she was thirteen, Beaumont's father died; this event caused the marriage arrangements between the couple to dissolve. She moved back home and two years later married Arthur Jones, heir to Viscount Ranelagh, at the age of 15 and she became known as Katherine Jones. It was common for noble women to get married at a younger age, but normally women of this time would not get married until their twenties. As evidenced through letters to her father from her husband, it is insinuated that Arthur Jones was unfaithful to her. Their marriage was not a good one. They spent most of their time living apart, Katherine moving back and forth between Ireland and London, and Arthur spending much of his time travelling. They had three daughters and one son: Catherine, Elizabeth, Frances, and Richard. Katherine lived in Ireland until 1642 when she was trapped in Athlone Castle for four months due to the rebellions in Ireland. Frustrated, she moved to London with her four children in tow.

In 1630, Jones's mother died, causing her bereaved father to erect a monument in St. Patrick's Cathedral which depicts the Boyle family as statues with the parents in the middle surrounded by their children. After her mother's death, Jones assumed a maternal role for her younger siblings Robert and Mary. In one of his memoirs, Robert Boyle recalls a time when Katherine chastised him for eating plums that he was meant to save for his pregnant sister-in-law. Further accounts suggest that Katherine supplied similar moral guidance to her younger siblings throughout their lives and up until her death.

== Intellectual life ==
In the mid-1640s in London, she came to be a friend and supporter of John Milton, sending him as pupil her nephew Richard Barry in 1645. Sometime later, Milton also taught her son Richard.

Apart from Samuel Hartlib and his closest ally John Dury, she knew John Beale, Arnold Boate and Gerard Boate, Sir Cheney Culpeper, Theodore Haak, William Petty, Robert Wood, and Benjamin Worsley. Christopher Hill suggested that her house may have been the meeting place of the "Invisible College" of the later 1640s. From 1656 Henry Oldenburg was tutor to her son Richard. In the 1650s her brother Robert Boyle had a laboratory in her London house, as well as in Oxford, and they experimented together. She was also prominent in the Hartlib Circle of correspondents. She commissioned Robert Hooke in 1676 to modify her house to include a laboratory for her brother.

Her letters suggest that her influence and encouragement on Boyle's work were considerable. Boyle credited her in some of his works but using terms like "a great Lady" rather than her name. His contemporaries widely acknowledged Jones's influence on his work, but later historiographies dropped her from the record. Theirs was "a lifelong intellectual partnership, where brother and sister shared medical remedies, promoted each other's scientific ideas, and edited each other's manuscripts."

In 1656, she went to Ireland on family business, staying several years. With Arthur Annesley and William Morice she interceded for Milton, arrested after the English Restoration of 1660. In 1668 her brother came to live with her on Pall Mall. They lived together for the last 23 years of their lives and both died in 1691 within a short period of time. They are buried in the south chancel of St Martin-in-the-Fields, London.

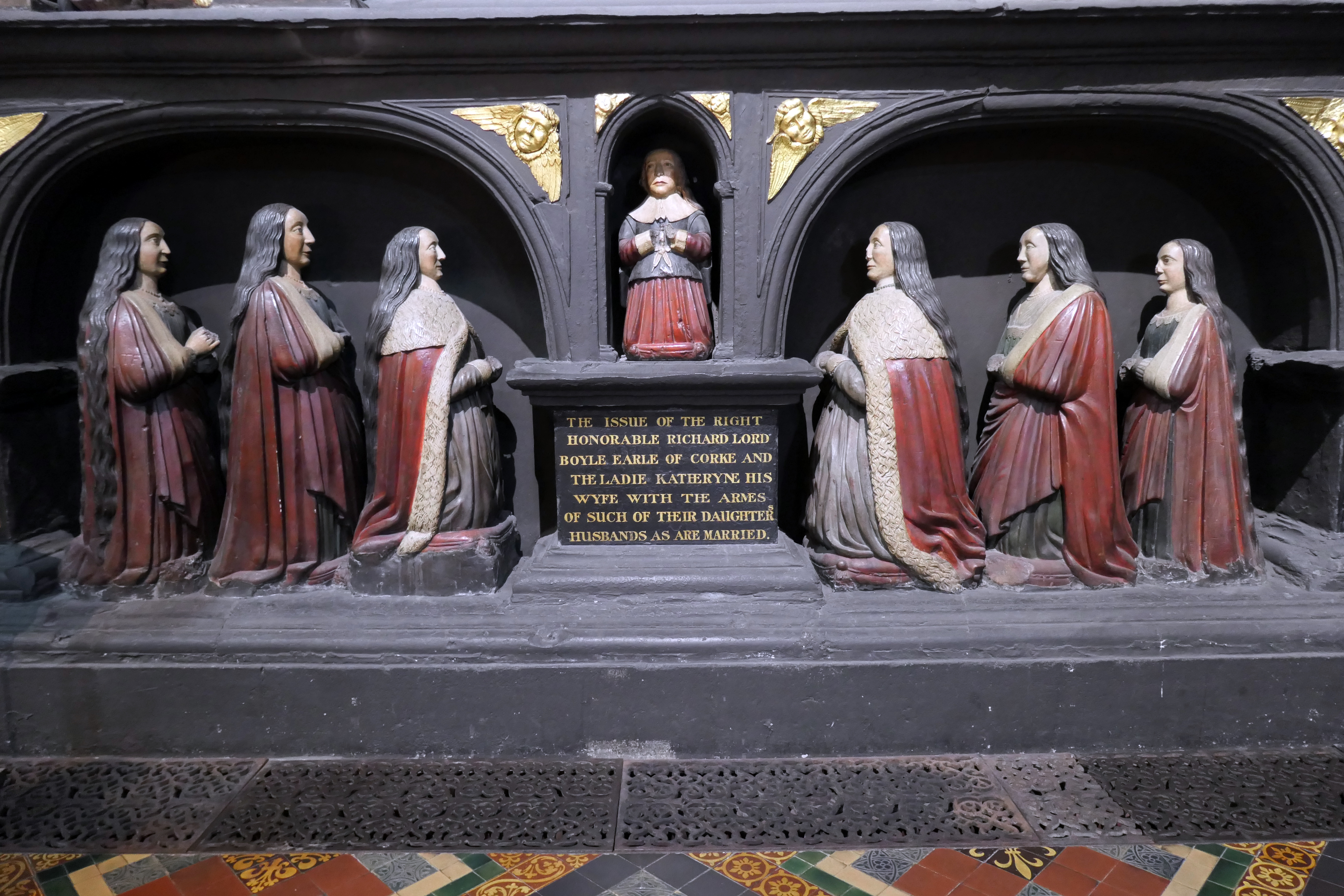
Katherine and her sisters on their parents' funeral monument

== Family ==
She had four children over the span of her life. Her children were:

- Catherine, born 1633, who married Sir William Parsons and then in 1660 Hugh Montgomery, 1st Earl of Mount Alexander. Later on, Catherine and Hugh would have a child named Catherine Montgomery. She would go on to marry Sir Francis Hamilton, 3rd Baronet of Castle Hamilton.
- Elizabeth, Jones's second daughter, was born around 1635 and would then go on to marry a footman much to her mother's dismay.
- Frances, born in Stalbridge in Dorset, England, on 17 August 1639, was Jones's youngest daughter. Frances was born prematurely and was often sick. She never married and instead lived with her mother for the majority of her life.
- Richard Jones, 1st Earl of Ranelagh, was born 8 February 1641. Richard was the only son born to Jones and her husband. He went on to marry Elizabeth Willoughby and they had three daughters together, Elizabeth, Frances, and Catherine. After Elizabeth, his wife, died he went on to marry the widow Lady Margaret Cecil. They did not produce any children together.

== Intellectual circles ==
Katherine Jones was involved in a number of intellectual circles including the Great Tew Circle, the Hartlib Circle, and the Invisible College. These intellectual circles were precursors to the Royal Society and included natural philosophers and experimenters. The Invisible College included many of Robert Boyle's acquaintances who were geographically spread out. Also, the Invisible College would often meet at Katherine Jones's house mainly due to the fact that she was Robert Boyle's oldest sister. Although their main interest was in science, they also believed in social improvements in aspects of education, science, and technology. The Great Tew Circle was started by Jones's friend Lucius Cary, the Viscount of Falkland. Members of the Great Tew Circle included Edward Hyde, William Chillingworth, Gilbert Sheldon, the Archbishop of Canterbury, Thomas Hobbes, Henry Hammond, Nicolas Culpeper and many others The Great Tew Circle's main. The Great Tew Circle which started with a couple of friends who conversed and studied together, became a place for people to go study and discuss their findings. This Circle of intellectuals was said to be a place where "liberty of conscience was preserved and respected."

Among Jones's intellectual acquaintances was Samuel Hartlib, creator of the Hartlib Circle group. She was introduced to Hartlib by her aunt Dorothy Moore when she first arrived in London in 1642. Hartlib collected correspondence from many intellectuals including Milton, René Descartes, John Dury, Lady Barrington, Benjamin Worsley, and Jones herself. It is known that Hartlib and Jones were very close. Among the collected letters of Samuel Hartlib is one in which Jones gives real estate advice to the Butlers. Hartlib even used Jones's address in London to receive letters. Jones's house often became a meeting place for people of many different political and religious backgrounds to discuss ideas.

Another one of Jones's friends was Thomas Willis, a writer and physician and member of the Oxford Club. The Oxford Club was a group of experimentalists looking to develop new and better ways to treat people's medical needs. Thomas Willis used Mayerne's Pharmacopoeia in his work of chemical experiments. Willis and Jones worked closely together on medical recipes and a few of her recipes even found their way into Willis's book, Pharmaceutice rationalis, written in 1674, although it is unclear which of Katherine's recipes he used. The Pharmaceutice rationalis is said to have pioneered the way we perceive anatomy and medicine today.

== Politics ==
Many people know of Jones because of her involvement in science and medicine, but her letters reveal that she was an avid political and religious philosopher. She was open-minded and her beliefs changed as she was confronted with new experiences. Jones primarily used epistolary as her means of communication, mostly when it came to sociopolitical ties. She used the connections she had with people through familial ties and friends in order to disperse information about the English Civil Wars and other politically charged situations. She would often write to powerful acquaintances during the civil wars that held high positions in order to sway peace between both parties. This would be her main form of communication and persuasion throughout her life.

In the 1630s, Jones followed the radical political belief of constitutional monarchy. In the 1640s due to her determination to spread critical thinking throughout all of Europe, she changed her political beliefs to support a republic. Another theory as to why she changed her beliefs from royalism to republicanism was that she saw the system of monarchy as a threat to the nation. This likely had to do with King Charles I of England, who became increasingly resistant to ceding any political power to Parliament in order to achieve peace during the Wars of the Three Kingdoms. Between 1642 and 1646, the beginning years of the first civil war, Jones was a staunch supporter of Charles, hoping he would find a quick resolution to the war. She wrote to Edward Hyde, a close friend, who was a political advisor to Charles. In the letter, she offered advice to Hyde to give to Charles on ways in which he might reconcile with Parliament to end the war quickly. However, the war would drag on for two more years, and Jones would ultimately end her support and sympathy for the king. Initially, Jones had sent a letter to Elizabeth Stuart, Queen of Bohemia, in the late 1640s to encourage her to talk to Charles, her brother. In the letter, Jones discussed her increasing disappointment with Charles as he refused to come to a peaceful resolution with Parliament. It is within this letter that Jones became more sympathetic to Parliament's cause. Between these two letters, it is apparent that Jones wanted peace more than anything. Her continuous shift in political alliances was chiefly for her desire to maintain peace within the country. If she felt that one side was closer to this desire than the other, then she would align herself with them. In 1648, Jones wrote to the Hartlib circle listing out seven questions total relating to the recent changes in political power. Jones, and other members of the Hartlib, were concerned about the legality of power being transferred from Charles to Parliament. Jones believed that Charles should remain King, but he should have the majority of his powers revoked. This included the royal veto. Essentially, she was advocating for a limited constitutional monarchy.

In the late 1640s, Jones's political associations changed once again as she became involved with religious nonconformists. These religious radicals, Protestants, Presbyterians, Independents, and Baptists, banded together in order to face the opposition of the Church of England. Jones was included within these groups as she was an advocate of the toleration movement when there was great division within London. Jones believed in respecting other people despite their religious affiliations and fought to unite nonconformist and conformists during the Great Plague of 1665. Although she called herself a conformist, she had a deep concern for the nonconformists and their treatment during the Plague. She argued that they were following their spiritual duties and doing what they believed God would want them to do despite what the law says. She said that they had the right to follow their own religious beliefs. The toleration movement carried on into the 1670s and 80s until the Toleration Act 1688 was enacted. In the 1670s, she supported the Whig cause and their belief in a limited monarchy and limited religious toleration.

== Influence on men ==
Jones wrote treatises for private circulation, which gave her a socially acceptable way to spread her ideas among circles of educated men without challenging the social norms of the time. She was in correspondence with many influential people.

Jones often used her connections with her intellectual circle to reform education to make it more widespread and available to girls. She also used her connections to spread interest in Protestantism to Ireland. She had many people to write to who both agreed with her and thought other things. With her aunt, the writer Dorothy King, Jones discussed how the education of girls had to be reformed to include "reason and intellect" instead of just domestic topics. She was an advocate for the education of girls, although the plans she made with Moore were never followed through.

Jones was also in correspondence with Elizabeth, Queen of Bohemia, the sister of King Charles I. In her letters, she addressed parliament and openly criticized it and the king. She criticized the inability of the king and parliament to reconcile their religious differences. In August 1646, four years after she had arrived in London, she openly criticized the King (Charles) for not negotiating a peaceful compromise with parliament after defeat. Jones, a usual advocate for peace between opposing parties, tried to use the Queen of Bohemia's influence with King Charles to urge him to settle on a peaceful resolution with Parliament.

== Science ==
Jones is known for her genius in medicine. In a letter to her brother, Lord Burlington, she described a friend of hers, Lady Clarendon, having "fits" and how she attended to her even when the doctors had given up on her. Jones used her own concoction and that seemed to be the only thing that helped Lady Clarendon. During the 1600s, women's involvement in what is today called chemistry was mostly in the form of medical remedies that they made in their kitchens. Sometimes these remedies included herbs and sometimes they were chemical compounds. These remedies could be found in their recipe books. Recipe books usually included domestic topics, finance keeping, food recipes, and medical remedies.

There is evidence that Jones practised chemistry in her own home with her brother, Robert Boyle. The chemistry and experiments practised by Jones can be found in her recipe book which examines scientific, and medical concoctions as well as recipes for food. According to Lynette Hunter, Jones had a chemistry set built for her brother in her home so that he could practice scientific experiments. Hunter speculates that she practiced alongside him.

A recipe book that is identified as belonging to the Boyle family has handwriting in it which has sometimes been attributed to Jones, on the basis of a reference to "My Brother Robert Boyl". Lynette Hunter suggested that Jones kept two recipe books of her own, one titled ‘Kitchen-Physick’, which included household remedies and food recipes and another book which included herbal remedies and chemistry. The ‘Kitchen-Physick’ recipe book included a recipe for "Spirit of Roses My Brother Robert Boyl's Way". However, Michelle DiMeo argues persuasively that the handwriting of "Hand One" in 'Kitchen-Physick' matches more closely that of her sister-in-law Margaret Boyle, Countess of Orrery. Married to Roger Boyle, 1st Earl of Orrery, it would have been entirely normal according to the usage of the time for Lady Orrery to refer to her brother-in-law (i.e., Arthur Jones) as "my brother". Handwriting analysis indicates that there are as many as four different styles of handwriting in the family recipe book. DiMeo emphasizes that the cookbook should be read as a multi-authored "compilation of the Orrery family's household knowledge and practice".

Nonetheless, some medical recipes in the book are explicitly attributed to Jones. They involve a range of both commonly available and exotic plant-based ingredients. The techniques mentioned in these recipes range from common methods such as bruising herbs in a mortar, to highly technical skills and apparatus for distillation. Jones's medical practice, therefore, was broad-ranging and included new and expensive scientific technologies as well as household and folk methods.

Jones's involvement in chemistry and her influence on her brother made her quite an extraordinary woman of her time. Women were not generally accepted into the field of medicine or chemistry at this time because it was assumed they would be busy taking care of the household instead of practising chemistry in their kitchens. The practice of chemistry was generally left to men who had the time and resources to conduct experiments.

== Death ==
In her final days, Jones was still avidly involved in politics and science. She wrote letters giving political advice to her friend whose husband wanted to move up in rank. She had the connections and the influence people wanted in politics so she had many friends asking her for advice and to put a good word in for them. She also still gave medical advice to people who wrote to her. Even in her last days, as she was getting sicker and frailer, she would have someone write letters for her since her hands were too weak to do it herself. She never stopped trying to help her friends.

Katherine Jones, Viscountess Ranelagh, died on 23 December 1691. Her cause of death is not fully known. Her brother, Robert Boyle, died on 31 December 1691, and left a behind a will which named Katherine Jones as the executor and the first person on his list of beneficiaries. In the will, he planned on giving her a ring that he had worn throughout his life, and cherished dearly. In the will, he states that he and Katherine shared a private love of this ring. He also left his estate to her and asked that it would be used as a Christian establishment. He also left receipts and recipes of his, from his research and medical practices. However, because she died before him, these receipts went to Robert Boyle's friend John Locke, who then published the second volume of Robert Boyle's Medicinal Experiments. Robert Boyle changed his will on 29 December 1691, to acknowledge the death of his sister and remove her as the primary executor. Katherine Jones's life was honoured with her brother Robert at a combined funeral on 7 January 1692. They were buried next to each other at the St. Martin-in-the-Fields. At the funeral Gilbert Burnet, a friend and the Bishop of Salisbury, spoke in remembrance of Katherine and his words are said to be one of the most famous depictions of her. He noted how she used her privileges to help and benefit others, and never did things for personal gain. He also noted that although she was very political and held strong opinions, "her Soul was never of a Party" and that she did not let politics bar her from helping others. He ended his remembrance of her with appreciation for her effect on her brother. His full remembrance:

"She lived the longest on the publickest Scene, she made the greatest Figure in all the Revolutions of these Kingdoms for above fifty Years, of any Woman of our Age. She employed it all for doing good to others, in which she laid out her Time, her Interest, and her Estate, with the greatest Zeal and the most Success that I have ever known. She was indefatigable as well as dextrous in it: and as her great Understanding, and the vast Esteem she was in, made all Persons in their several turns of Greatness, desire and value her Friendship; so she gave herself a clear Title to employ her Interest with them for the Service of others, by this that she never made any use of it to any End or Design of her own. She was contented with what she had; and though she was twice stript of it, she never moved on her own account, but was the general Intercessor for all Persons of Merit, or in want: This had in her the better Grace, and was both more Christian and more effectual, because it was not limited within any narrow Compass of Parties or Relations. When any Party was down, she had Credit and Zeal enough to serve them, and she employed that so effectually, that in the next Turn she had a new stock of Credit, which she laid out wholly in that Labour of Love, in which she spent her Life and though some particular Opinions might shut her up in a divided Communion, yet her Soul was never of a Party: She divided her Charities and Friendships both, her Esteem a well as her Bounty, with the truest Regard to Merit, and her own Obligations, without any Difference, made upon the Account of Opinion. She had with a vast Reach both of Knowledge and Apprehensions, a universal Affability and Easiness of Access, a Humility that descended to the meanest Persons and Concerns, an obliging Kindness and Readiness to advise those who had no occasion for any further Assistance from her; and with all these and many more excellent Qualities, she had the deepest Sense of Religion, and the most constant turning of her Thoughts and Discourses that way, that has been perhaps in our Age. Such a Sister became such a Brother."

It encompassed Jones's attitude of "piety and charity".
