= Hartlib Circle =

17th century correspondence network

The Hartlib Circle was the correspondence network set up in Western and Central Europe by Samuel Hartlib, an intelligencer based in London, and his associates, in the period 1630 to 1660. Hartlib worked closely with John Dury, an itinerant figure who worked to bring Protestants together.

== Workings of the Circle ==
=== Structure ===
J. T. Young writes:

At its nexus, it was an association of personal friends. Hartlib and Dury were the two key figures: Comenius, despite their best efforts, always remained a cause they were supporting rather than a fellow co-ordinator. Around them were Hübner, Haak, Pell, Moriaen, Rulise, Hotton and Appelius, later to be joined by Sadler, Culpeper, Worsley, Boyle and Clodius. But as soon as one looks any further than this from the centre, the lines of communication begin to branch and cross, threading their way into the entire intellectual community of Europe and America. It is a circle with a definable centre but an almost infinitely extendable periphery.

Examples given of the "periphery" are John Winthrop and Balthazar Gerbier.

=== Themes ===
- Agriculture and horticulture: Ralph Austen, John Beale, Robert Child, Cheney Culpeper, Cressy Dymock, Gabriel Plattes, Adolphus Speed.
- Alchemy, chemistry, mineralogy: Robert Boyle, Frederick Clod, Cheney Culpeper, John Worthington, Ezechiel Foxcroft, John French, Johann Moriaen, Gabriel Plattes.
- Finance: Cheney Culpeper, William Potter
- Mathematics: John Pell, Robert Wood.
- Medicine: William Rand, Thomas Coxe
- Pansophism: Hartlib and Dury were close allies of Comenius.
- Protestantism: Sarah Hewley, John Dury, John Sadler, John Stoughton.
- Settlement of Ireland: Gerard Boate and his brother Arnold Boate, William Petty, Benjamin Worsley.

=== Education ===
Educational reform was topical and central to the pansophist programme. Hartlib compiled a list of "advisers", and updated it. It included Jeremy Collier, Dury, Thomas Horne, Marchamont Nedham, John Pell, William Rand, Christian Ravius, Israel Tonge, and Moses Wall. The staff proposed for Durham College was influenced by the Circle's lobbying. John Hall was another associate who wrote on education. In the period 1648–50 many works on education appeared from Circle authors (Dury, Dymock, Hall, Cyprian Kinner, Petty, George Snell, and Worsley).

A letter from Hartlib to John Milton prompted the tract Of Education (1644), subtitled To Master Samuel Hartlib. But Milton's ideas were quite some way from those of the Comenians.

Individuals involved with the Hartlib Circle played an important role in Sweden's scientific revolution, as they travelled to consult on educational and religious reform, as well as tutored Swedish students who were sent abroad.

=== The problem of the "Invisible College" ===
Robert Boyle referred a few times in his correspondence to the 'Invisible College'. Scholarly attention has been paid to identifying this shadowy group. The social picture is not simplistic, since en masse Hartlib's contacts had fingers in every pie.

Margery Purver concluded that the Invisible College coincided with the Hartlib-led lobbyists, those who were promoting to the Parliament the concept of an Office of Address. The effective lifetime of this idea has been pinned down to the period 1647 to 1653, and as the second wave of speculation on the ideal society, after Comenius left England.

In the later Interregnum the "Invisible College" might refer to a group meeting in Gresham College. According to Christopher Hill, however, the 1645 group (the Gresham College club that was convened from 1645 by Theodore Haak, certainly a Hartlibian) was distinct from the Comenian Invisible College. Lady Katherine Ranelagh, who was Boyle's sister, had a London salon during the 1650s, much frequented by virtuosi associated with Hartlib.

== Projects ==
=== Office of Address ===
One of Hartlib's projects, a variant on Salomon's House that had more of a public face, was the "Office of Address" — he envisaged an office in every town where somebody might go to find things out. This might well be compatible with Baconian ideas, and a related public office scheme was mooted under James I (by Arthur Gorges and Walter Cope). But the immediate inspiration was Théophraste Renaudot and his Paris bureau d'adresse. For example, at a practical level, Hartlib thought people could advertise job vacancies there — and prospective employees would be able to find work. At a more studious level, Hartlib wanted academics to pool their knowledge so that the Office could act as a living and growing form of an encyclopedia, in which people could keep adding new information.

The Office of address idea was promoted by Considerations tending to the happy Accomplishment of Englands Reformation in Church and State (1647), written by Hartlib and Dury, a pamphlet also including an ambitious tiered system of educational reform. There was a limited implementation, by Henry Robinson, in 1650.

=== Foundation of the Royal Society ===
In 1660 Hartlib was at work writing to John Evelyn, an important broker of the royal charter for the eventual Royal Society. He was, however, not promoting a purist Baconian model, but an "Antilia". This was the name chosen by Johann Valentin Andreae for a more hermetic and utopian fellowship. The proposal, which conformed to Comenian ideas as more compatible with pansophia or universal wisdom, was in effect decisively rejected. Hartlib was relying on a plan of Bengt Skytte, a son of Johan Skytte and knighted by Charles I, and the move was away from Bacon's clearer emphasis on reforming the natural sciences. Despite some critical voices, the Hartlib-Comenius trend was written out of the Royal Society from the beginning. Hartlib himself died shortly after the Society was set up.

== Eclectic attitudes and associations ==
Hartlib was noted as a follower of Francis Bacon and Comenius, but his background in the German academies of the period gave him a broad view of other methods and approaches, including those of Petrus Ramus, Bartholomäus Keckermann, and Jacobus Acontius. Further, the Hartlib Circle was tolerant of hermetic ideas; Hartlib himself had an interest in sigils and astrology. Boyle too attempted to straddle the opening divide between experimental chemistry and alchemy, by treating the latter in a less esoteric way; he did distance himself to an extent from the Hartlib group on moving to Oxford around 1655.

Both Boyle and William Petty became more attached to a third or fourth loose association, the group around John Wilkins, at this period, now referred to as the Oxford Philosophical Club. Wilkins was to be the founding Secretary of the Royal Society.
