= Robert Child (agriculturalist) =

English physician, agriculturalist and alchemist

Robert Child (1613–1654) was an English physician, agriculturalist and alchemist. A recent view is that his approach to agriculture belongs to the early ideas on political economy.

== Early life ==
The son of John Child of Northfleet in Kent he was educated at Corpus Christi College, Cambridge. He then attended the universities of Leiden and Padua, taking a medical degree at Leiden in 1635, and his M.D. at Padua in 1638.

== In New England ==
Child did not practise medicine as a new graduate. In 1638 he travelled to New England, where his first stay lasted to 1641. There he came to know John Winthrop the younger, and a supporter of his ironworks project. Residing in Watertown, he joined the Nashaway Company, who were interested in iron ore; but left to go back to England.

Moore writes that, during the period from 1641, Child worked in England using good contacts, trying to make New England self-sufficient in iron. He also travelled widely in continental Europe, meeting the alchemist Pierre Jean Fabre.

On Child's return to New England in 1645, he was active in running the Saugus ironworks. He took an interest in the fur trade; he was also prospecting for a vineyard, but became involved in local politics and religious matters. This second visit ended in his departure in 1647, forced out as a Presbyterian.

Child had taken part in agitation against the dominant Independents (congregationalists) in the Massachusetts Bay Colony, becoming the leader of the dissident Remonstrant group, who took their name from the "Remonstrance and Humble Petition" he wrote. Scholars disagree on its aims, but they included extending the Long Parliament's control across the Atlantic. The group of seven signatories included also Samuel Maverick (the others being Thomas Burton, lawyer at Hingham, John Dand, Thomas Fowle, John Smith, Thomas Joy and David Yale).

Pamphlets on the case, in the Massachusetts General Court, appeared in 1647. New-England's Jonas cast up in London was by Child's brother John, a major in the parliamentary army. New England's Salamander was by Edward Winslow, who had been instructed to counter the arguments of the Remonstrants and Samuel Gorton. It has been suggested that the "Jonas" pamphlet was written by William Vassall.

== Alchemy ==
Child shared with John Winthrop the younger, and Richard Leader of the Saugus works, an interest in alchemy arising from the metallurgy of iron. In the 17th century, a number of writers stated that Child was Eirenaeus Philalethes, the pseudonymous alchemist. That view was circulated by Johann Ferdinand Hertodt, among others.– It was incorrect, since the pseudonym concealed in fact his associate George Starkey from Massachusetts Bay Colony. Child, along with Benjamin Worsley, also took an interest in the chemical work of Johann Glauber.

Among Child's chemical contacts was John French who wrote on distillation. He knew Robert Boyle well enough to introduce Starkey to him, in 1650. At that time he was also setting up a group including Thomas Henshaw, Thomas Vaughan and William Webbe, to gather and translate alchemical and chemical texts.

== Agriculture ==
Child was an advocate of intensive cultivation over traditional agriculture. His views were expressed in The Defects and Remedies of English Husbandry (1652) and put him at odds with conventional wisdom, as represented by Walter Blith. He is now considered to have been ahead of his time. This work, known also as Child's "Large Letter", formed part of Samuel Hartlib His Legacie of 1651; others who contributed to the work include Cressy Dymock, Gabriel Plats (in the 1655 edition) and Richard Weston. The farming use of marl provoked a comment by Child published in the Legacie, suggesting that "husbandmen" should take an interest in what could be dug out of the ground.

Samuel Hartlib was an intelligencer whose wide-ranging group of correspondents is now identified as the Hartlib Circle; Child had joined it by 1645. He was in agreement with other members of the Circle in approving of enclosures of land. Gerard and Arnold Boate's Ireland's Naturall History was representative of the Circle's interests, and took up Child's suggestion in a survey of "Metals, Minerals ..." in Ireland.

== Last years ==
In 1651 Child was invited by Arthur Hill to his estate in Ulster. He remained there for the rest of his life, working on natural history and studying the agriculture of the area.
