= Invisible College =

Informal group of scholars, as in Royal Society of London's precursor groups

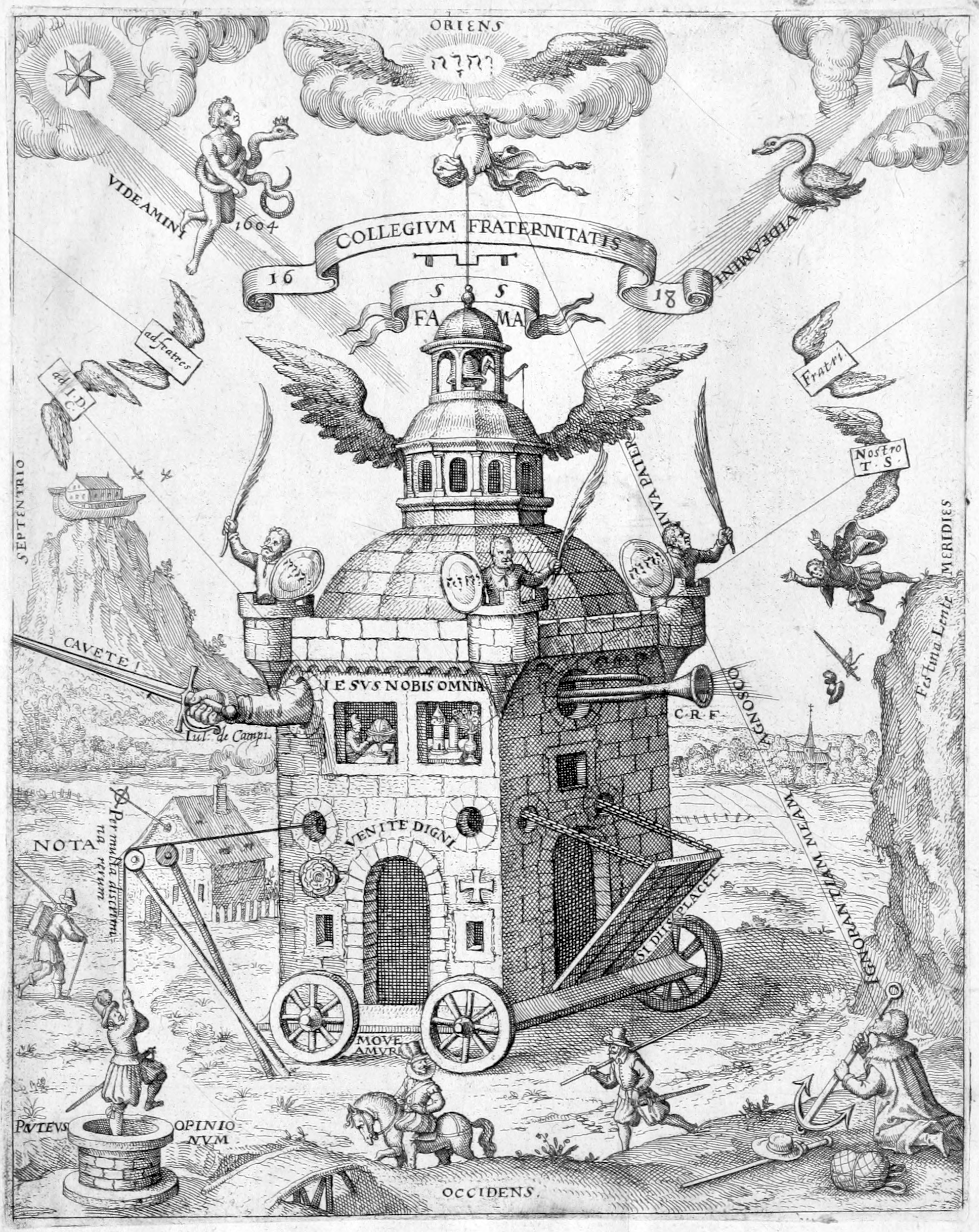
Emblematic image of a Rosicrucian College; illustration from Speculum sophicum Rhodo-stauroticum, a 1618 work by Theophilus Schweighardt. Frances Yates identifies this as the "Invisible College of the Rosy Cross".

Invisible College is a term used to describe a non-public network of researchers operating in an informal way. Originally used to describe the early association of the Enlightenment-era Royal Society of London, which consisted of a number of natural philosophers such as Robert Boyle and Christopher Wren, the term has been of considerable interest to scholars since the 1960s with the research of Derek Price and Donald Beaver. Research on this topic has focused closely on law schools and the sciences.

== Background ==
The name historically originates from a group of individuals in the mid-seventeenth century who eventually formed the Royal Society of London. Prior to that, they met informally, separate from the more prominent groups associated with Wadham College (Oxford University) and Gresham College. They corresponded via letters to garner recognition for their work, establish precedence, and stay informed about others' research. Members of this early Royal Society of Scientists did not belong to a formal institution, thus they referred to themselves as an invisible college due to their "geographic closeness and regular meetings based on shared scientific interests". In the current academic framework, the term has become less specific, and its meaning and interpretation have varied widely among different authors. The term accrued currency for the exchanges of correspondence within the Republic of Letters.

== Connection with Robert Boyle and the Royal Society ==
=== Detailed evidence ===
In letters in 1646 and 1647, Boyle refers to "our invisible college" or "our philosophical college". The society's common theme was to acquire knowledge through experimental investigation. Three dated letters are the basic documentary evidence: Boyle sent them to Isaac Marcombes (Boyle's former tutor and a Huguenot, who was then in Geneva), Francis Tallents who at that point was a fellow of Magdalene College, Cambridge, and London-based Samuel Hartlib.

Dorothy Stimson writes that "The work of the Royal Society in seventeenth century England is of such significance in the development of experimental science and in the recognition given this "new philosophy" that great importance is attached to any part of the life of that century which may help to explain the origins and growth of the Society." and that Comenius was in large part a big influence on this group.

On the historical movement, Clay Shirky notes in his book Cognitive Surplus that:

Much of the members’ practical work involved chemistry. They were strongly critical of the alchemists, their intellectual forebears, who for centuries had made only fitful progress. By contrast, the Invisible College put chemistry on a sound footing in a matter of a couple of decades, one of the most important intellectual transitions in the history of science. What did the Invisible College have that the alchemists didn’t? It wasn’t their tools—chemists and alchemists both started out with vials, braziers, and scales. Nor was it insight—no single figure suddenly advanced chemistry, as Newton did with physics. The Invisible College had one big advantage over the alchemists: they had one another.

The Hartlib Circle were a far-reaching group of correspondents linked to Hartlib, an intelligencer. They included Sir Cheney Culpeper and Benjamin Worsley who were interested, among other matters, in alchemy. Worsley in 1646 was experimenting on saltpetre manufacture, and Charles Webster in the Oxford Dictionary of National Biography argues that he was the "prime mover" of the Invisible College at this point: a network with aims and views close to those of the Hartlib Circle with which it overlapped. Margery Purver concludes that the 1647 reference of "invisible college" was to the group around Hartlib concerned to lobby Parliament in favour of an "Office of Address" or centralised communication centre for the exchange of information. Maddison suggests that the "Invisible College" might have comprised Worsley, John Dury and others with Boyle, who were interested in profiting from science (and possibly involving George Starkey).

Richard S. Westfall distinguishes Hartlib's "Comenian circle" from other groups; and gives a list of "invisible college" members based on this identification. They comprise: William Petty, Boyle, Arnold Boate and Gerard Boate, Cressy Dymock, and Gabriel Platte. Miles Symner may have belonged to this circle.

=== Historiography of the Royal Society ===
Lauren Kassell, writing for the Oxford Dictionary of National Biography, notes that the group of natural philosophers meeting in London from 1645 was identified as the "invisible college" by Thomas Birch, writing in the 18th century; this identification then became orthodox, for example in the first edition Dictionary of National Biography. This other group, later centred on Wadham College, Oxford and John Wilkins, was centrally concerned in the founding of the Royal Society; and Boyle became part of it in the 1650s. It is more properly called "the men of Gresham", from its connection with Gresham College in London.

It is the identification of the Gresham group with the "invisible college" that is now generally queried by scholars. Christopher Hill writes that the Gresham group was convened in 1645 by Theodore Haak in Samuel Foster's rooms in Gresham College; and notes Haak's membership of the Hartlib Circle and Comenian connections, while also distinguishing the two groups. Haak is mentioned as convener in an account by John Wallis, who talks about a previous group containing many physicians who then came to Foster's rooms; but Wallis's account is generally seen to be somewhat at variance with the history provided by Thomas Sprat of the Royal Society.

== Modern use ==
The concept of invisible college was developed in the sociology of science by Diana Crane (1972) building on Derek J. de Solla Price's work on citation networks. It is related to, but significantly different from, other concepts of expert communities, such as epistemic communities (Haas, 1992) or communities of practice (Wenger, 1998). Recently, the concept was applied to the global network of communications among scientists by Caroline S. Wagner in The New Invisible College: Science for Development (Brookings 2008).

Alesia Zuccala notes that previous studies on the invisible college have indicated that it functions as "a fairly organized system for scientists" and that "a certain degree of predictable behavior (i.e. information sharing and collaboration)" can be found within this system.

Lievrow and others note that "In contrast to the considerable research attention that has been paid to examining the communication of scientific knowledge, especially through formal channels like publishing (e.g. Menzel 1968), there has been remarkably little study of why. and how scientific knowledge itself might grow as a function of both formal and informal communication networks."

Price has stated that some but not all scientists in a particular research area maintain a high level of informal communication and that information received in this manner is essential for the conduct of effective research.

Crane has stated that although a social circle may occasionally form within a research field, it is unlikely to be present in every field at all times. In some areas, such circles may never emerge. When they do form, their size and significance to the members are likely to fluctuate over time.

In the 1960s, a group of academics (including astronomer J. Allen Hynek and computer scientist Jacques Vallée) held regular discussion meetings about UFOs. Hynek referred to this group as The Invisible College.

=== Cultural references ===
The term is mentioned in the novel The Lost Symbol by Dan Brown and Foucault's Pendulum by Umberto Eco. It was the inspiration for the Unseen University in the works of Terry Pratchett, and was one of the main reference points for Grant Morrison's The Invisibles comic book series.

== See also ==
- Junto (club)
- Education in Poland during World War II – Overview of education in occupied Poland during World War II, on underground universities
- Flying University – Former underground educational enterprise in Warsaw, Poland
- Bloomsbury Group
