= Johann Stephan Rittangel =

German controversial writer and Christian Hebraist

Johann Stephan Rittangel (Latin: Rittangelius) (1606 – 1652) was a German controversial writer and Christian Hebraist.

== Life ==
He was born at Forscheim near Bamberg. It is stated that he was born a Jew, became converted to Roman Catholicism, then became a Calvinist, and lastly joined the Lutheran Church. He became professor of Oriental languages at Königsberg.

Rittangel visited the Netherlands and England in 1641–2. He taught Hebrew in Amsterdam, where he dressed like a rabbi, but others found him hard to place. He obtained a Hebrew manuscript of the Sefer Yezirah through the Mennonite merchant Gerebrand Anslo, for translation into Latin. He was in London in late 1641, meeting Comenius and John Dury. His English contacts were interested in his direct knowledge of the Karaites, and the Samuel Hartlib papers contain an account by Rittangel of them. Johann Moriaen of the Hartlib Circle saw to the publication of the Yezirah translation in Amsterdam in 1642. Rittangel's knowledge of the Karaites was reported to be from a visit in 1641 to a community at Trakai, according to Mordecai ben Nissan.

Rittangel died at Königsberg in 1652.

== Works ==
Rittangel issued a number of translations of Hebrew works:

- of the Sefer Yezira, as Liber Jezirah qui Abrahamo Patriarchae adscribitur, 1642;
- of the Passover Haggadah, 1644, published also in his Libra Veritatis (Franeker, 1698); and
- one of the earliest translations of Jewish prayers, under the title Hochfeyerliche Sollennitaeten, Gebethe und Collecten Anstatt der Opfer, Nebst Andern Ceremonien so von der Jüdischen Kirchen am Ersten Neuen-Jahrs-Tag Gebetet und Abgehandelt Werden Müssen, Königsberg, 1652.

His posthumous work Bilibra Veritatis was written to substantiate the claim that the Targums prove the doctrine of the Trinity. This is also the subject of his Veritas Religionis Christianæ (Franeker, 1699).
