= Johannes Rulicius =

German Protestant minister

Johannes Rulicius (Note: Also Rulitius or Rulitus, and Rulizius; Dutch and German forms Rulice, Rulitz, Relitz, Rülz, Rulich, etc. In England Rulice or Ruliss. First name given as Jan, Johann and Joannes; also John.) (1602–1666) was a German Protestant minister.

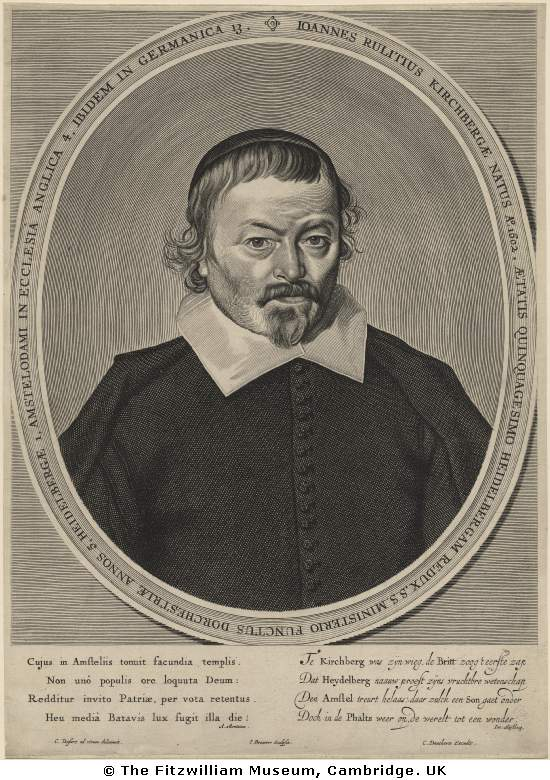
Johannes Rulicius, contemporary engraving.

== Life ==
He was born in Kirchberg in the Electorate of the Palatinate. Leaving Germany, he spent time in England, at Boston, Lincolnshire with John Cotton, by 1628. He was subsequently a minister at Dorchester in England from some point before 1630; he is said to have arrived there in 1626 and become a curate to John White in 1627.

Rulicius had left Germany to avoid the Thirty Years' War and was active as a Protestant fundraiser. He left Dorchester, in 1631, to attend Elizabeth of Bohemia. He continued to be involved in the collection of money for refugees.

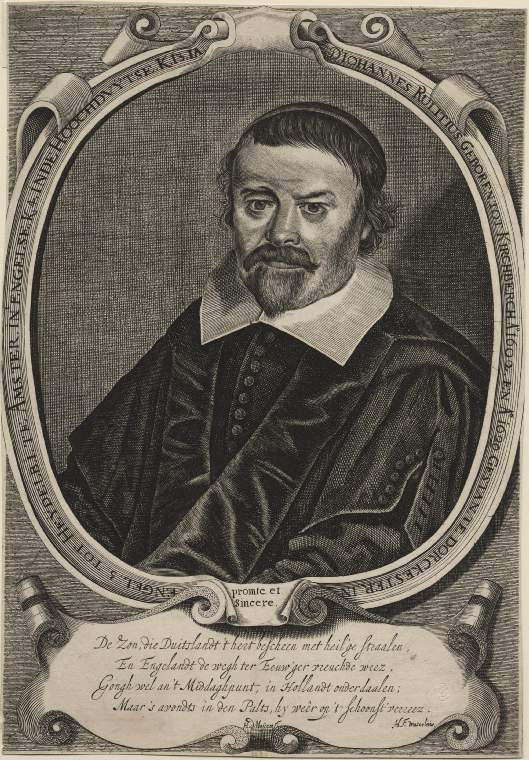
Johannes Rulicius, 17th-century engraving.

At Heidelberg in 1635, Rulicius was a pastor of the English Reformed Church, Amsterdam in 1636, acting as assistant to John Paget; and remaining to 1639, or leaving in 1637. He was briefly considered by the "conformist" faction for a post to succeed the non-conformist Samuel Balmford in the English church in the Hague, but rejected because his command of English and Dutch was seen to be lacking and it was not certain where Rulicius stood in conformist and non-conformist contention.

Afterwards Rulicius moved to the German church in Amsterdam, and formed an association with Johann Moriaen of the Hartlib Circle. He was an associate of Comenius in Amsterdam in 1656/7, and Comenius dedicated to him some works of that period. Rulicius, with Gottfried Hotton and Moriaen, were among his friends there who had tried to persuade him to move there, from Sweden where he was at the time. This plan was launched first in 1641, when Comenius was on his way to England, on behalf of Louis de Geer; Rulicius with Moriaen had distributed many copies of works by Comenius, for Hartlib, but found the proposal was misunderstood. It was much later, and under forced circumstances, that Comenius did come, having lost almost everything when Leszno where he was living was attacked by Polish forces; Louis De Geer having died, his son Laurence De Geer became patron to Comenius.

Among his other correspondents was Johann Heinrich Bisterfeld.

== Works ==
His funeral sermon for Peter Streithagen (1591–1653) was included in an edition of Streithagen's Novus Homo.
