= John Dury =

Scottish Calvinist minister and intellectual

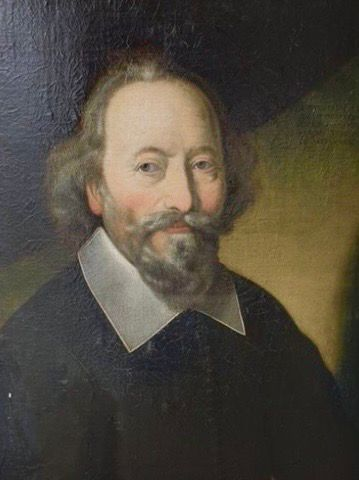
John Dury, portrait by an unknown artist, c. 1665, private collection.

John Dury (1596 in Edinburgh – 1680 in Kassel) was a Scottish Calvinist minister and an intellectual of the English Civil War period. He made efforts to re-unite the Calvinist and Lutheran wings of Protestantism, hoping to succeed when he moved to Kassel in 1661, but he did not accomplish this. He was also a preacher, pamphleteer, and writer.

== Early life ==
He was the fourth son of the exiled Scottish presbyterian minister Robert Durie; John was brought up in the Netherlands, at Leiden, attending the university there. He was in Cologne, at the Walloon Church, 1624-6, and subsequently at Elbląg (Elbing). He was a close associate of Samuel Hartlib, a native of Elbląg, whom he met there, and shared his interest in education. According to Richard Popkin, another key influence was Joseph Mede, from whom Dury took a method of scriptural interpretation; this interpretation has been challenged by recent research claiming that Dury developed his "Scriptural Analysis" before meeting with the works of Mede. While at Elbing he translated an anti-trinitarian work of Samuel Przypkowski into English.

From 1628 Dury petitioned Gustavus Adolphus for help in the cause of Protestant unity. He spent much time from 1630 to 1661 wandering through Europe, working for ecclesiastical peace between Calvinists and Lutherans. Through an introduction from Hartlib, he also met Comenius, who spent some years in Elbing as well.

Up to 1633, Dury had Anglican support from George Abbot. In that year, Abbot died and was replaced by William Laud, with whom Dury had a much more difficult relationship; Christopher Hill states "Laud had no use for the efforts of Comenius, Dury and Hartlib to reunite Protestants". Dury was ordained in 1634, and went to Sweden, supported by 38 English Puritans. The networking of Dury and Hartlib in the 1630s brought them close to Oliver Cromwell, through Oliver St John (a relation by marriage, and friend) and the Godmanchester preacher Walter Welles, a neighbour.

Dury then travelled widely in northern Europe, and was tutor to Mary, Princess of Orange in the Hague. He had a long though unproductive meeting with René Descartes in 1635; also in the Netherlands he was an associate of Adam Boreel and Petrus Serrarius, and an influential figure.

== In Civil War and Commonwealth England ==
At a key moment in English and European politics, Dury in August 1641 published Concerning the Work of Peace Ecclesiastical, urging Protestants to unite across national boundaries. This work was dedicated to his patron Sir Thomas Rowe, and had been written in 1638. In 1639 Viscount Mandeville was writing to Dury, in the context that the situation in particular of German Protestants was being mooted and linked to the possibility of the English and Scottish churches could organise or broker such a union.

In 1641, Dury and Comenius came to England; an invitation had been mooted in a sermon by John Gauden in 1641, at the start of the Long Parliament. The backers of the scheme to bring Comenius then included John Pym and Lord Brooke as well as Mandeville.

Dury gave a well-known sermon to the Parliament on 26 November 1645, Israels Call to March out of Babylon into Jerusalem. He was given an official appointment, as tutor to the younger children of Charles I; from 1646 these had been in the care of Algernon Percy, 10th Earl of Northumberland.

After the war in England had ended, he argued both for religious toleration, and for acceptance of the Parliamentarian regime. He incurred the displeasure of the Westminster Assembly, to which he belonged, for his part in the 1648 publication (with Hartlib and John Goodwin) in the translation of part the theological work Satanae Strategemata of Jacob Acontius on toleration. He called on the Ranter Abiezer Coppe to repent, and helped in drafting his recantation. He provided arguments in pamphlets of March and October 1649 for supporting the Rump Parliament. Hill places Dury with Anthony Ascham and Marchamont Nedham as propounding the theory that Parliament had legitimacy conferred by God because it held power de facto. Barbara Lewalski calls Dury's arguments 'Hobbesian'. Hill considers that the failure of Cromwell's plan to create a unified Protestant church in England of the 1650s put paid to Dury's ecumenical ideas.

In 1652 he translated John Milton's Eikonoklastes into French as Eikonoklastēs, ou, Réponse au livre intitulé Eikon basilikē. In 1655 Milton quoted from letters of Dury in his Pro se defensio contra Alexandrum Morum.

In 1654 he was sent as a diplomat by Oliver Cromwell to Germany, the Netherlands and Switzerland. In 1652/3 he had travelled with Bulstrode Whitelocke to Sweden.

He also worked with Whitelocke as a deputy librarian, from 1649, of the collection going back to Jane Lumley. His book of 1650 on librarianship, sometimes said to be the first such work, came out of his experience in this post.

== Jews and Hebraists ==
Dury met Manasseh ben Israel in 1644, and heard from him an account of Antonio de Montesinos's alleged discovery of the Ten Tribes in America. Dury wrote in favour of a Hartlib Circle project, for a College of Jewish Studies. Parliament was lobbied for funds. The proposed faculty were Johann Stephanus Rittangel, Christian Ravius and Menasseh ben Israel.

In 1649 Dury addressed a further inquiry to Manasseh on the subject of the Ten Tribes, which resulted in the publication of The Hope of Israel. In 1650 appeared Thomas Thorowgood's Jewes in America; Dury read it in manuscript, and contributed to later editions. He included information on the Karaites, in whom he had a particular interest, from Rittangel.

Dury is considered to have been one of those around Cromwell influencing the decision to allow Jews to enter England officially (they were expelled by Edward I). He was the cautious author of a pamphlet of 1656, A Case of Conscience: Whether It Be Lawful to Admit Jews into a Christian Commonwealth, in it he laid down certain conditions that Jews must fulfil in order to be admitted (no blasphemy or proselytism etc). To a question put to him by Hartlib, as to the general lawfulness of their admission, Dury replied in the affirmative; but from the point of view of expediency, he considered that circumstances as to a particular time and place might render their admission unwise.

== Irenicism and millenarianism ==
Dury's long ecumenical efforts have earned him a name as an irenicist. This territory he shared, to an extent, with his contemporary Hugo Grotius. Dury made contact with Grotius through his follower Samson Johnson (1603–1661). That relationship soured, since Dury had a hand in Johnson's dismissal as chaplain to Elizabeth, Queen of Bohemia, suspected of Socinianism. According to historian Hugh Trevor-Roper,

Dury, like Grotius, was an idealist, but their ideals were not quite the same. He wished to achieve not reunion for the peace of the Church but union of all Protestants for the holy war: in particular union of Lutherans and Calvinists.

Dury’s irenicism and philosemitism can be understood as interrelated aspects of an expansionist Protestant cause focussed on Britain, Ireland, continental Europe, and the Atlantic world. In this understanding, the Portuguese Jews (and American Indians) appear as victims of Spanish Catholicism in desperate need of Protestant help.

Richard Popkin and Jefferey Jue have argued that Dury was a millenarian. His millenarian views are said to have pointed to 1655 as apocalyptic. Against that view it has been argued that Dury warned readers about attempts to predict the onset of the Millennium. In his preface to the millenarian tract Clavis Apocalyptica Dury seems to come out against the idea of a political millenarianism and to defend a more "moral" interpretation of millenarianism.

== Pansophism and alchemy ==
Alchemy was within the interests of the Hartlibian group, and both Dury and his wife were involved. In 1649 they were quizzing Worsley on distillation. In the first half of 1651 Dury was a witness to George Starkey, in an apparent transmutation, and then recommended Starkey to Moriaen.

== Family ==
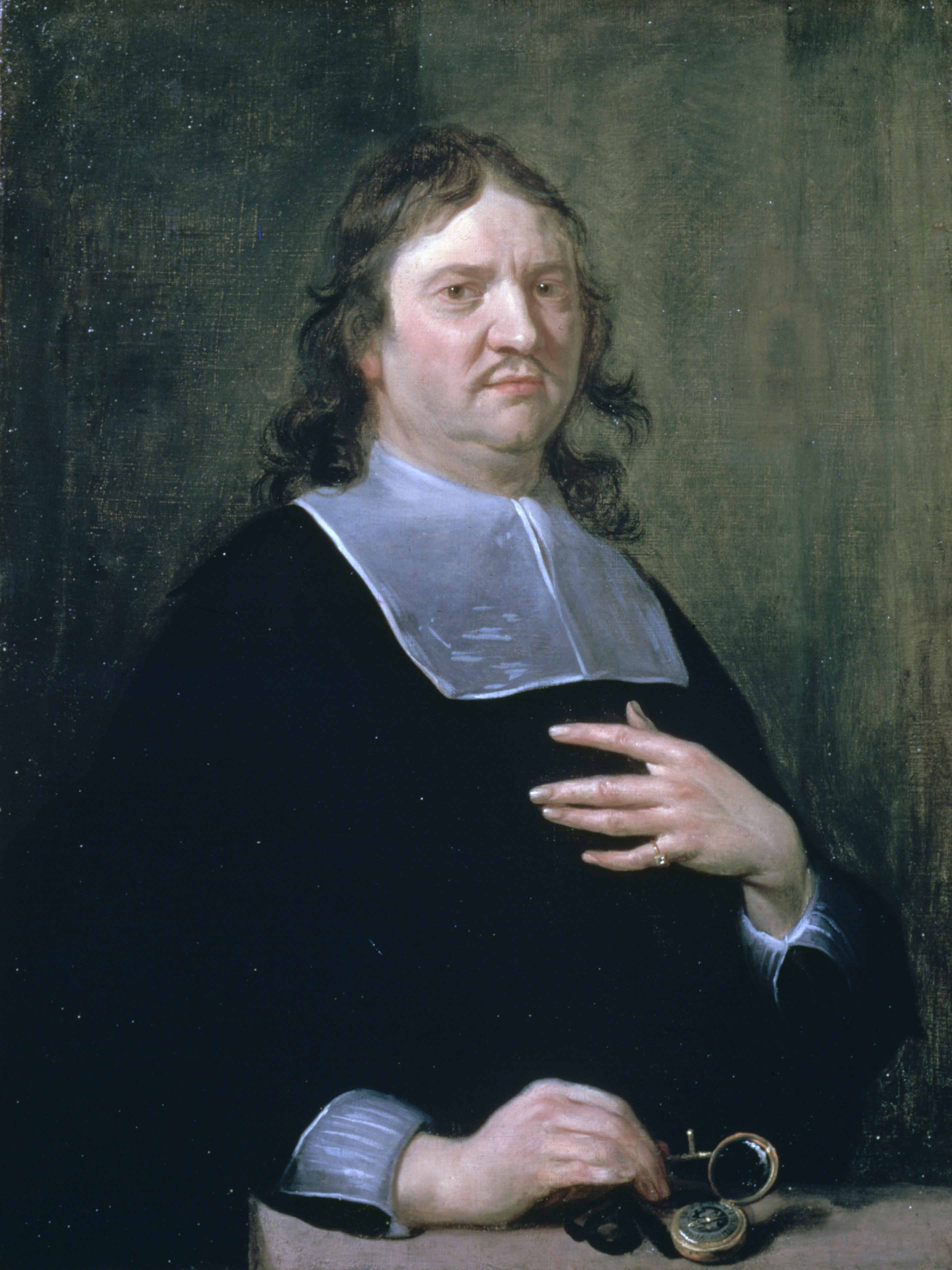
Henry Oldenburg.

In 1645 he married Dorothy Moore (née King), an Irish Puritan widow. Dorothy Durie (sic), daughter of Sir John King and Catherine Drury, was a noted writer on education and the role of women in the church. The match was arranged by Dorothy's niece, Katherine Jones, Viscountess Ranelagh (1615–1691), daughter of Richard Boyle, 1st Earl of Cork, and wife of Arthur Jones, 2nd Viscount Ranelagh. To be precise on the somewhat tenuous relationship, Arthur Moore, Dorothy's first husband, and Frances Jones née Moore, mother of Arthur Jones, were brother and sister, both children of Garret Moore, 1st Viscount Moore. By this marriage Dury was connected to Robert Boyle, brother of Lady Ranelagh.

Their daughter Dora Katherina Dury (1654–77) was Henry Oldenburg's second wife. Dorothy also had two sons by her first husband.

== Works ==
- Analysis Demonstrativa
- Paraenesin
- Answer to the Lutherans
- De pace inter evangelicos procuranda sententiæ quatuor quarum tres a reverendis Dominis episcopis (1638) with Thomas Morton, John Davenant, Joseph Hall
- A Briefe Relation of That Which Hath Been Lately Attempted to Procure Ecclesiasticall Peace Amongst Protestants (1641)
- A summary discourse concerning the work of peace ecclesiasticall (1641)
- Consultatio theologica super negotio pacis ecclesiasticæ promovendo (1641)
- Good counsells for the peace of reformed churches (1641) with John Davenant, Thomas Morton, Joseph Hall and James Ussher
- A motion tending to the publick good of this age and of posteritie (1642)
- An epistolary discourse (1644)
- A model of church-government (1647)
- Considerations tending to the happy Accomplishment of Englands Reformation in Church and State (1647) with Samuel Hartlib
- The Reformed School (1648), edited by H. M. Knox (1958)
- Considerations Concerning the Present Engagement (1649)
- A Seasonable Discourse (1649)
- The Reformed Librarie-Keeper (1650) Online text at Project Gutenberg
- The unchanged, constant, and single-hearted Peace-maker drawn forth into the world (1650)
- Objections Against the Taking of The Engagement Answered (1650)
- Jvst re-proposals to humble proposals (1650)
- The Reformed Spiritual Husbandman (1652)
- A summarie platform of the heads of a body of practicall divinity which the ministers of the Protestant churches abroad have sued for, and which is farther enlarged in a treatise intituled, An earnest plea for gospel-communion (1654)
- A Brief Answer to Some of the Objections and Demurs Made Against the Coming in and Inhabiting of the Jews in this Common-wealth: With a Plea on Their Behalf, Or Some Arguments to Prove it Not Only Lawful, But the Duty of Those Whom it Concerns to Give Them Their Liberty and Protection (they Living Peaceably) in this Nation (1656)
- A Declaration of John Dury, to make known the Truth of his Way and Deportment in all these Times of Trouble (1660)
- Irenicorum Tractatuum Prodromus (1662)
- Extractum ex harmonia confessionum oblatum ecclesiis reformatis ut examinetur antequam opus ipsum Lutheranis offeratur (1671)
- Touchant l'intelligence de l'Apocalypse par l'Apocalypse même (1674)
- Le Vrai Chrestien (1676)
