= William Rand (physician) =

English physician

William Rand (fl. 1650–1660) was an English physician who projected general reforms in medical education, practice and publication. His views were Paracelsian and Helmontian, and he participated in the Hartlib Circle.

== Life ==
According to Gillian Darley, Rand's father was a physician at Wotton, Surrey, connected to the Evelyn family. William Rand studied medicine at the University of Louvain. It has been suggested also, by Charles Webster, that he was a Cambridge graduate, and son of the apothecary James Rand, matching him rather tentatively to the William Rand who matriculated at Catharine Hall, Cambridge in 1633; this Rand studied at the University of Leiden, though was MD of another institution. In any case Rand was unlicensed by the London College of Physicians. He worked as an apothecary to the parliamentary hospital at Ely House.

In 1652 he addressed thoughts to Samuel Hartlib on reform of the book trade. Natural philosophers found it difficult to get into print, and booksellers were rapacious. Rand suggested a way round the stationers' monopoly, with a system of scholarly licensing.

In 1656 he contributed to the programme of Hartlib and Robert Boyle for the reform of science, advocating the establishment of a College of Graduate Physicians. The project had the support of Katherine Jones, Viscountess Ranelagh, who was Boyle's sister. A proposal for a Society of Chemical Physicians of the 1660s, again Helmontian in attitude, for a while gathered some momentum. Charles Webster has argued for some continuity from Rand's group to the 1665 group behind the Society of Chemical Physicians; but the latter had notable court patronage too placing it in a very different part of the political spectrum, as well as being open to those without medical degrees.

== Works ==
The W. R. writing a dedicatory poem to the Mataeotechnia medicinae praxeos (1651) of Noah Biggs has tentatively been identified as Rand. He translated a work of the apothecary Remeus Francken on surgery (1655). In 1657 he published a translation of Pierre Gassendi's life of Nicolas-Claude Fabri de Peiresc, as The Mirrour of True Nobility and Gentility, with John Evelyn as dedicatee.

An English translation of the Encheiridium anatomicum et pathologicum (1648) by Johannes Riolanus, as A sure guide, or, The best and nearest way to physick and chyrurgery (1671), was by Nicholas Culpeper and W. R., who is identified as Rand. Culpeper died in 1654, and, with William Rowland, Rand in the 1650s was active in editorial work and translation of Culpeper's papers. At the same time they were supporters of the medical initiatives of William Walwyn.

== Views ==
Rand's views are available in correspondence, with Hartlib and others.

He was an admirer of Machiavelli. Rand expressed admiration also for Thomas Hobbes in a letter to Hartlib in 1651, finding in him a Protestant comparable in creative ideas to the Catholic Kenelm Digby. Rand also thought Hobbes a royalist, but (against opinion in the universities) a potentially excellent adviser on education. Hartlib would include Rand's name in a list for a "council for schooling", with John Milton and others. Writing to Hartlib from the Netherlands in 1653, Rand proposed a synthesis of the systems of Gassendi and van Helmont.

Rand's correspondence with Evelyn shows Rand's mortalist views, to which Evelyn found some attraction. Rand's views are also known from his comment on the courage required by Henry Lawrence to publish on adult baptism (Of Baptisme, Rotterdam 1646, initially anonymous). A letter of Rand to Benjamin Worsley is positive about Socinianism.
