= William Rand =

William Rand may refer to:

- William Rand (physician) (fl. 1650–1660), English medical reformer
- William Rand (athlete) (1886–1981), competed in the 1908 Summer Olympics
- William H. Rand (1828–1915), American publisher, co-founder of Rand McNally
- Willian Rand, a pseudonym of the American writer William Roos (1911–1987)
