= Henry Oldenburg =

German-English theologian and scientist (1618–1677)

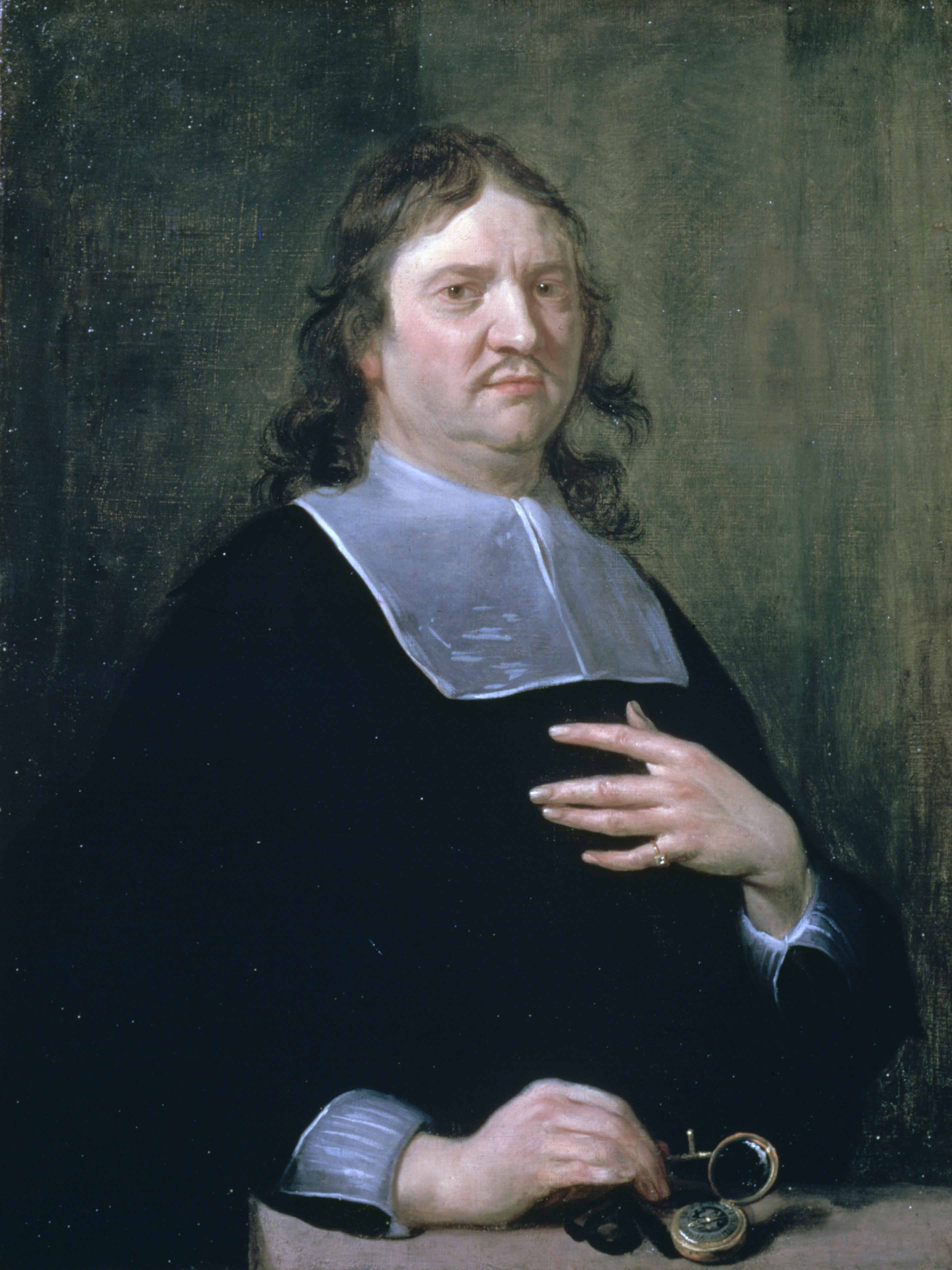
- Oldenburg portrayed by Jan van Cleve (III), 1668
- Born: Heinrich Oldenburg c. 1618; Bremen, Germany
- Died: 5 September 1677; London, England
- Occupations: Theologian; Diplomat; natural philosopher
- Known for: Early development of academic peer review

Henry Oldenburg (also Henry Oldenbourg) FRS (c. 1618 as Heinrich Oldenburg – 5 September 1677) was a German theologian, diplomat, and natural philosopher, known as one of the creators of modern scientific peer review. He was one of the foremost intelligencers of 17th-century Europe, with a network of correspondents to rival those of Fabri de Peiresc, Marin Mersenne, and Ismaël Boulliau. At the foundation of the Royal Society in London, he took on the task of foreign correspondence, as the first Secretary.

== Early life ==
Born in Bremen, Germany, he was trained in theology and received his degree from the local Gymnasyum illustre on 2 November 1639. He had an initial very firm grasp of the German, Latin, and Greek languages. His movements during the 1640s are unclear, but he is thought to have worked as a tutor in England for much of the decade. In 1648 he left England and spent some time in Leiden and Utrecht in the Dutch Republic, where he became conversant in the Dutch language. After a short stay back in Bremen in the spring, he arrived back in London in July 1653 as a diplomatic envoy of the city of Bremen's senate to the Lord Protector Oliver Cromwell for matters concerning the ongoing First Anglo-Dutch War.

Settling then in England of the Interregnum, he forged a strong relationship with his lifelong patron Robert Boyle, and with John Milton, who wrote of him approvingly that he had "learnt to speak our language more accurately and fluently than any other foreigner I have ever known" (Correspondence, 1.34). Oldenburg eventually became the tutor to Boyle's nephew, the politician Richard Jones, and travelled with him through France from 1657 to 1660. Here Oldenburg also added to his intellectual baggage the French language, the last European language in which he was completely conversant.

Oldenburg married his second wife, Dora Katherina Dury (1654–77), the daughter of Dorothy and John Dury in London on 13 August 1668. Either through Milton, whom he had met earlier in his diplomatic mission, or through Lady Ranelagh, sister to Boyle and the mother of Richard Jones, Oldenburg gained entry to an important intellectual circle, including his fellow German native, Samuel Hartlib, whose extensive web of correspondents Oldenburg was to take over, John Dury who became his father-in-law, and others such as the economist William Petty. Among Oldenburg's correspondents at this time was Baruch Spinoza, whom he was introduced to on a trip to the Netherlands, and to whom he presented a volume of writings on scientific topics by Boyle.

== Secretary of the Royal Society ==
After the Restoration he became an early member (original fellow) of the Royal Society (founded in 1660), and served as its first secretary along with John Wilkins, maintaining an extensive network of scientific contacts through Europe. He also became the founding editor of the Philosophical Transactions of the Royal Society. Oldenburg began the practice of sending submitted manuscripts to experts who could judge their quality before publication. This was the beginning of both the modern scientific journal and the practice of peer review. Philosophical Transactions of the Royal Society continues today and is the longest running scientific journal in the world.

He was briefly imprisoned in the Tower of London as a suspected spy in 1667, during the Second Anglo-Dutch War. Oldenburg's correspondence was linked to support from the politician Sir Joseph Williamson; in part Oldenburg supplied Williamson with intelligence information.

Oldenburg enjoyed good health in his lifetime, but he fell seriously ill on 3 September 1677, and he died two days thereafter at his Pall Mall, London home. He was interred on 7 September at St Mary the Virgin, Bexley. His widow died ten days later.

== Foreign correspondents ==
=== Denmark ===
- Rasmus Bartholin.

=== Flanders ===
- René François Walter de Sluse.

=== France ===
- Adrien Auzout, Henri Justel, Pierre Petit, Ismaël Bullialdus.

=== Germany ===
- Sir William Curtius, Johann Hevelius, Gottfried Leibniz, Philipp Jacob Sachs von Lewenheimb, Johann Daniel Major, Ehrenfried Walther von Tschirnhaus, Martin Vogel.

=== Italy ===
- Paolo Boccone, Giovanni Domenico Cassini, Marcello Malpighi., Manfredo Settala

=== Netherlands ===
- Reinier de Graaf, Christiaan Huygens and his father, Constantijn Huygens, Antoni van Leeuwenhoek, Willem Ten Rhijne, Benedictus/Baruch Spinoza, Peter Serrarius, Jan Swammerdam, Isaac Vossius.

== See also ==
- Peer review
