= Johannes Sibertus Kuffler =

German chemist (1595–1677)

Johannes Sibertus Kuffler (1595–1677) was a German inventor and chemist, from Cologne. He had a 1618 doctorate from the University of Padua. After he married Catherina, daughter of Cornelius Drebbel, he started in a successful dyeing business in Leiden, with his brother Abraham. Supposedly he used a procedure invented by his father-in-law, using stannic chloride as a fixative. He was an associate of Johann Glauber, and went into an alchemical venture with Johann Moriaen and Benjamin Worsley. In 1656 the alchemist Israel Tonge provided a loan of 100 pounds to have the Kuffler family moved from Arnhem in the Netherlands to England so that "his abilities in his profession, his relation to Cornelius Dribellius his life & conversation & concerning the reality & certaintie of the Experiments, hereafter mentioned in these præsents, shall vnto wise & indiferent men be of satisfaction.". He later moved it to Bow, London. The new colour was called "Color Kufflerianus" or "Bow dye". During the Protectorate they also spent much effort promoting a 'secret weapon' (torpedo or submarine) for naval warfare, petitioning Richard Cromwell.

Like his father-in-law, he contributed to technology, in the matter of ovens that were self-regulating. He demonstrated a use as incubator to the Royal Society.
