= Dorothy Dury =

Anglo-Irish writer on education (1613–1664)

Dorothy Durie
- Born: Dorothy King; 1613; Dublin
- Died: 1664 (aged 50–51); London
- Occupation: writer
- Writing career
- Subject: education

Dorothy Durie or Dorothy Dury (1613–1664), born Dorothy King, first married name Dorothy Moore (c.1618–1645), was an Anglo-Irish writer on education. She had a talent for languages and she was interested in the education of women, in alchemy and in the study of medicine.

== Life ==
Durie was born in Dublin in about 1613. Her father was Sir John King (died 1637) of Boyle, County Roscommon, Clerk of the Crown and Hanaper and a member of the Irish House of Commons, and her mother was Catherine Drury (died 1617), daughter of Robert Drury of Laughlin and Elizabeth Carew, and grand-niece of Sir William Drury, Lord President of Munster. She had eight siblings, including Sir Robert King of Boyle Abbey and the poet Edward King, whose early death inspired John Milton to write the poem "Lycidas".

Her English father was based mainly in Dublin but he had been granted lands by the Crown in Ireland under dubious circumstances: by the time of his death he held land in twenty-one counties in all. He sat in the Irish House of Commons as MP for County Roscommon, and held numerous public offices.

Durie was interested in education, although she considered her own education to have been frivolous. Despite this she could read both Latin and Greek and she was fluent in French: she and her two sisters, Lady Margaret Lowther and Lady Mary Caulfeild, Baroness Charlemont, were considered to be among the best-educated women in Ireland of their generation. When she visited France it was said that she was the first educated woman there since Lady Jane Grey.

Around 1628 she married Arthur Moore, fifth son of Garret Moore, 1st Viscount Moore and Mary Colley, who owned 1000 acres in Ireland and was known to enjoy his drink. They had two sons, Charles and John. He died on 9 April 1635 and Durie moved to London where she stayed with Katherine Boate and her husband Gerard Boate, physician and author of A Natural History of Ireland. She had some lands in Ireland but most of them seem to have been lost, and she would eventually sell some of her remaining land in Ireland to Katherine Boate.

In August 1642 she moved to the Netherlands in order that she could renew her friendship with Calvinist divine John Dury (who was a friend of John Milton). She had consulted him about the education of her sons, and she and Dury began a correspondence. In March 1642 he had taken up a job in The Hague as the child Princess Mary Stuart's chaplain. Dorothy followed him as he toured the Netherlands. She had to scotch rumours of a secret marriage between them, although one source says she was the Princess's governess.

She married John Dury in 1645 and they returned to England. Their daughter, Dora Katherina Dury (1654–77), later became the second wife of Henry Oldenburg, also a younger member of the same Hartlib Circle in which John himself was so prominent, and the first secretary of the Royal Society.

She exchanged letters with the theologian André Rivet concerning the role of women in religion and she corresponded with Lady Ranelagh, with whom she discussed both the education of girls and love in marriage.

They both took an interest in alchemy and later she dabbled in pharmacy, either because she was short of money or out of interest in selling medicines.

Durie died in London in 1664 while her husband was abroad.

Of her sons, Charles died without issue. John married Elizabeth Honeywood, daughter of Sir Robert Honywood of Charing in Kent and Frances Vane, daughter of Sir Henry Vane the Elder, and founded an enduring branch of the Moore family based at Drumbanagher House in County Armagh. He died in 1680.
