= Johannes Rothe =

Johannes Rothé, or Jan Rothe, de Rothe of Rode, also Mr Roder (Amsterdam, 2 December 1628 - 18 March 1702), Lord of Oud-Wulven and Wayen in the Dutch Republic, was a prophetic preacher and Fifth Monarchist.

He was the son of an Amsterdam patrician, Zacharias Rothe, a sugar merchant and administrator at the Dutch East India Company. His mother was Mary Bas. She died in childbirth. His father sent him on foreign trips in preparation for merchant life, where he was introduced to the pietistic ideas of Ludwig Friedrich Gifftheil among others.

Walking the Haagse Bosch in 1652 he received a calling as a prophet, stating "God came to me like in a heavy tempest".

During the First Anglo-Dutch War, he served as an itinerant preacher. Through sermons and writings, he sought contact with foreign leaders. In 1654 he was imprisoned in England by Oliver Cromwell, as his sermons were seen as a plea for the return of Charles II of England. After his release in 1658, he travelled to Denmark and Prussia, before returning to England in 1660. At that time, Charles had been restored to the crown and rewarded his supporters, including Rothé, who was elevated to a peerage. In London, he married Anna (Nan) Hartlib, daughter of the celebrated scholar and "Intelligencer" Samuel Hartlib. The diarist Samuel Pepys wrote an account of the wedding, which took place in Goring House, and was described as a magnificent occasion. Pepys somewhat cynically remarked that Nan was lucky to marry a wealthy man, ("a great fortune she has lit upon"), since her father was almost destitute. Presumably Roder, or his brother-in-law, the German-born chemist Frederick Clod, who had married Nan's sister Mary, paid for the lavish wedding.

After returning to the Low Countries, Rothé continued writing pamphlets. He threatened senior people, especially the "stadhouder", declaring that they should do penance. He announced the coming of Nebuchadnezzar II, Chaldean king of the Neo-Babylonian Empire. In the year 1672 (the Dutch "year of disaster") after the assassination of Johan de Witt, he foretold the end of the world and with his supporters he moved North to fight the final battle against Satan. He arrived in Hamburg in 1677 with his followers, who quickly disbanded after the world's end failed to arrive.

Because of another pamphlet aimed at William III of Orange he was arrested in 1676 and imprisoned. Family connections led to his release.

== Publications ==
- Eenige Schriften, tot dienst van alle Inwoonderen van het Triumphante Koninckrijck Jesu Christi. 1664
- Een nieuwe Hemel en Aerde. Amsterdam 1673
- Eenige Prophetien en revelatien Godts, aengaende de Christen Werelt in dese Eeuw. Amsterdam 1673
- Spiegel voor alle Menschen, besonderlijck voor de Leeraren, in dese Eeuw. Amsterdam 1673
- Het leger des Grooten Godts. Amsterdam 1673
