= Robert Wood (mathematician) =

English mathematician

Robert Wood or Woods (1622?–1685) was an English mathematician.

== Life ==
Born at Pepperharrow, near Godalming in Surrey, in 1621 or 1622, was the son of Robert Wood (d. 1661), rector of Pepperharrow. He was educated at Eton College, and matriculated from New Inn Hall on 3 July 1640. Obtaining one of the Eton postmasterships at Merton College in 1642, he graduated B.A. from that college on 18 March 1646–7, proceeded M.A. on 14 July 1649, and was elected a fellow of Lincoln College by order of the parliamentary commissioners, on 19 September 1650, in the place of Thankfull Owen.

After studying physic for six years he was licensed to practise by convocation on 10 April 1656. He associated with the ‘Oxford club’ around John Wilkins of Wadham College. On a visit to Samuel Hartlib in 1658 he described how he had been assigned a task related to the cataloguing of the Bodleian Library, one of the interests of the time of the ‘club’, which was a precursor to the Royal Society. Wood was elected a Fellow of the Royal Society, but much later (6 April 1681). Wood had contacted Hartlib in 1656 with a scheme for currency reform to decimal coinage, and was drawn into the Hartlib circle of correspondents.

He went to Ireland and became a retainer of Henry Cromwell, who dispatched him to Scotland to ascertain the state of affairs there. On his return to England he became one of the first fellows of the Durham College founded by Oliver Cromwell. He was a prominent supporter of the Commonwealth, and a frequenter of the Rota Club formed by James Harrington.

On the Restoration he was deprived of his fellowship at Lincoln College and returned to Ireland, where he professed loyalty, graduated M.D., and became chancellor of the diocese of Meath. He purchased an estate in Ireland, which, he afterwards sold in order to buy one at Sherwill in Essex. On his return to England he became mathematical master at Christ's Hospital, but after some years he resigned the post and paid a third visit to Ireland, where he was made a commissioner of the revenue, and finally accountant-general. This office he retained until his death, at Dublin, on 9 April 1685. He was buried in St. Michael's Church. He married Miss Adams, by whom he had three daughters Catherine, Martha, and Frances.

== Works ==
He was the author of A New Al-moon-ac for Ever; or a Rectified Account of Time, London, 1680; and of another tract, entitled The Times Mended; or a Rectified Account of Time by a New Luni-Solar Year; the true way to Number our Days, London, 1681. In these treatises, which were dedicated to the Order of the Garter, and sometimes accompanied by a single folio sheet entitled Novus Annus Luni-solaris,'he proposed to rectify the year so that the first day of the month should always be within a day of the change of the moon, while by a system of compensations the length of the year should be kept within a week of the period of rotation round the sun.

Wood translated the greater part of William Oughtred's Clavis Mathematica into English; he had been one of Oughtred's pupils. He published two papers in the Philosophical Transactions in 1681.
