= Frederick Clod =

Frederick Clod (or Clodius) (1625 – after 1661), was a physician and "mystical chemist" of German extraction. He lived in a sizeable house (taxed on eight hearths) in Axe Yard, London, next door to the Hartlibs, whose daughter Mary he married in 1660. He was also a neighbour to the diarist Samuel Pepys, who mentions him several times. He was a minor figure in scientific circles and a friend of Robert Boyle, to whom he supplied some very varied recipes.

He came to England in 1652, having been recommended to Samuel Hartlib by Johann Moriaen. He had been in the service of Frederick III of Denmark, collecting "Rarities", and himself was a native of Holstein.

He presided at the wedding of his sister-in-law Nan Hartlib to Johannes Rothe in 1660. Pepys, a guest at the wedding, describes it as a social event of great magnificence. This suggests that Clod was a man of some wealth, since the Hartlibs were then living in dire poverty ("Nan will have nothing in the world" Pepys remarked), and Nan's father could not possibly have paid for the wedding.
