= Israel Tonge =

English divine

- Born: 11 November 1621; Tickhill, West Riding of Yorkshire, England
- Died: 1680 (aged 58–59)
- Education: University College, Oxford
- Known for: Popish Plot conspirator

Israel Tonge (11 November 1621 – 1680), aka Ezerel or Ezreel Tongue, was an English divine. He was an informer in and probably one of the inventors of the Popish Plot.

== Career ==
Tonge was born at Tickhill, near Doncaster, the son of Henry Tongue, minister of Holtby, Yorkshire. He graduated from University College, Oxford and became a schoolmaster at Churchill, Oxfordshire where he became interested in gardening, alchemy, and chemistry. In 1656 he became a doctor of theology, and taught grammar at the Cromwellian Durham College until its closure in 1659. In 1656 he provided a loan of 100 pounds to Johannes Sibertus Kuffler to have him and his family (including his wife Catharine, daughter of the famous inventor Cornelius Drebbel) moved from the Netherlands to England so that "his abilities in his profession, his relation to Cornelius Dribellius his life & conversation & concerning the reality & certaintie of the Experiments, hereafter mentioned in these præsents, shall vnto wise & indiferent men be of satisfaction." Following the Restoration, he held a succession of livings. He became chaplain of the garrison of Dunkirk until this was sold to the French in 1661. On 26 June 1666 he became rector of St Mary Staining, but only three months later the church burnt down during the Great Fire of London.

== Anti-Catholic activity ==
Tonge blamed the Jesuits for both his own and London's losses. His obsession was so great that he wrote many articles denouncing the Roman Catholic Church and containing conspiracy theories about Rome's insatiable quest for power. He made very little money from his writing, for which he blamed the Government's hostility, but which the historian J. P. Kenyon attributed to his appallingly "turgid and incoherent" prose style. From 1675, Tonge was acquainted with the fervently anti-Catholic physician, Sir Richard Barker. Barker provided Tonge with food, lodgings, and money. He encouraged Tonge's anti-Catholic studies and had him appointed rector of Avon Dassett in Warwickshire, but "illegall practices", claimed Tonge, prevented him from accepting the position.

Barker also sponsored the Baptist preacher Samuel Oates. In 1677 at the physician's Barbican home, Tonge met Samuel's son, Titus Oates. Tonge provided Titus with money and the two agreed to co-author a series of anti-Catholic pamphlets. In fact, Titus converted to Catholicism and left England for the Jesuit College of St Omer. At the time Tonge was puzzled by Oates's disappearance but he would later claim that he encouraged Oates's actions to learn more about the Jesuits.

== The fabricated Popish Plot ==
On Oates's return, he further stoked Tonge's paranoia with stories of Jesuit conspiracies, including a plot against a feared anti-Catholic author – Tonge himself. At Tonge's request Oates wrote a lengthy manuscript- the first of many Plot Narratives- and arranged with Tonge that Tonge would pretend to find it in the gallery of Sir Richard Barker's house at the Barbican, where Tonge was then living. So excited was Tonge by the contents of the Narrative that through his friend, the chemist Christopher Kirkby, who assisted the King with his chemical experiments, he managed to obtain an audience with Charles II, where he summarised Oates' claims. Charles soon became a complete skeptic about the Plot, but his initial reaction was that "among so many particulars he could not say that there might not be some truth". He was at least sufficiently impressed to ask the Lord Treasurer, Danby, to investigate. Danby agreed that the matter deserved inquiry, despite opposition from another leading minister, Sir Joseph Williamson, who knew Tonge and believed he was insane.

Tonge then took two crucial decisions: firstly he persuaded Oates to swear to the truth of his allegations before the much-respected magistrate, Sir Edmund Berry Godfrey. Secondly, he persuaded the King and Danby to put the matter before a full meeting of the Privy Council. At the hearing, Tonge himself made a bad impression: his reputation for eccentricity, if not outright madness, was well known, and he was "altogether smiled at ". Oates, on the other hand, gave a superb performance: so detailed and convincing was his story that the Council ordered the arrest of all the leading Jesuits accused, as well as Edward Coleman, former secretary to the Duke of York (later James II & VII.) The news of this, followed by the murder of Godfrey, caused public hysteria to erupt.

During the years of the Plot, Tonge was a secondary figure: he did not claim to have any first-hand knowledge of the Plot itself, and was never a witness in any of the Plot trials. However, a generous allowance from the Crown allowed him to live out his last years in comfort at Whitehall; the Crown even paid for his funeral.

== Reputation ==
Tonge's reputation has suffered through his close association with Oates, and some historians have bracketed them together as a pair of perjurers. However J. P. Kenyon, in his classic study of the Plot, concludes that Tonge truly believed Oates' lies, because they confirmed his own fixed belief in a Jesuit conspiracy. That Tonge was an honest fanatic seems to have been the view of most of those who knew him, including the King, Danby, and Gilbert Burnet, who wrote in 1678 that Tonge was "so lifted up that he seemed to have lost the little sense he had."

== See also ==
- Popish Plot
- Titus Oates
- Anti-Catholicism in the United Kingdom
