= Cheney Culpeper =

British landowner

Sir Cheney Culpeper
- Born: 1601
- Died: 1663 (aged 61–62)
- Education: Hart Hall, Oxford
- Scientific career
- Fields: Alchemy

Sir Cheney Culpeper (1601–1663) was an English landowner, a supporter of Samuel Hartlib, and a largely non-political figure of his troubled times, interested in technological progress and reform. His sister Judith was the second wife of John Colepeper, 1st Baron Colepeper.

== Landowner ==
He was the eldest son of Sir Thomas Colepeper of Hollingbourne, Kent and Elizabeth Cheney of Guestling, Sussex. After legal training, he was knighted in 1628. He had an estate at Great Wigsell, Salehurst, East Sussex, which he bought from his brother-in-law Lord Colepeper, but had possession of it only briefly. He bought Elmley Castle, Worcestershire in 1650. He lived mainly at Leeds Castle, which his father had purchased for his sons in 1632. Being later disinherited by his father, he became heavily indebted. During the English Civil War, he was a convinced Parliamentarian, unlike his father who was a staunch Royalist, and sat on the County Committee for Sequestration. This clash of opinions no doubt explains his father's decision to disinherit him. He never regained possession of his estates, and died a ruined man only a year after his father.

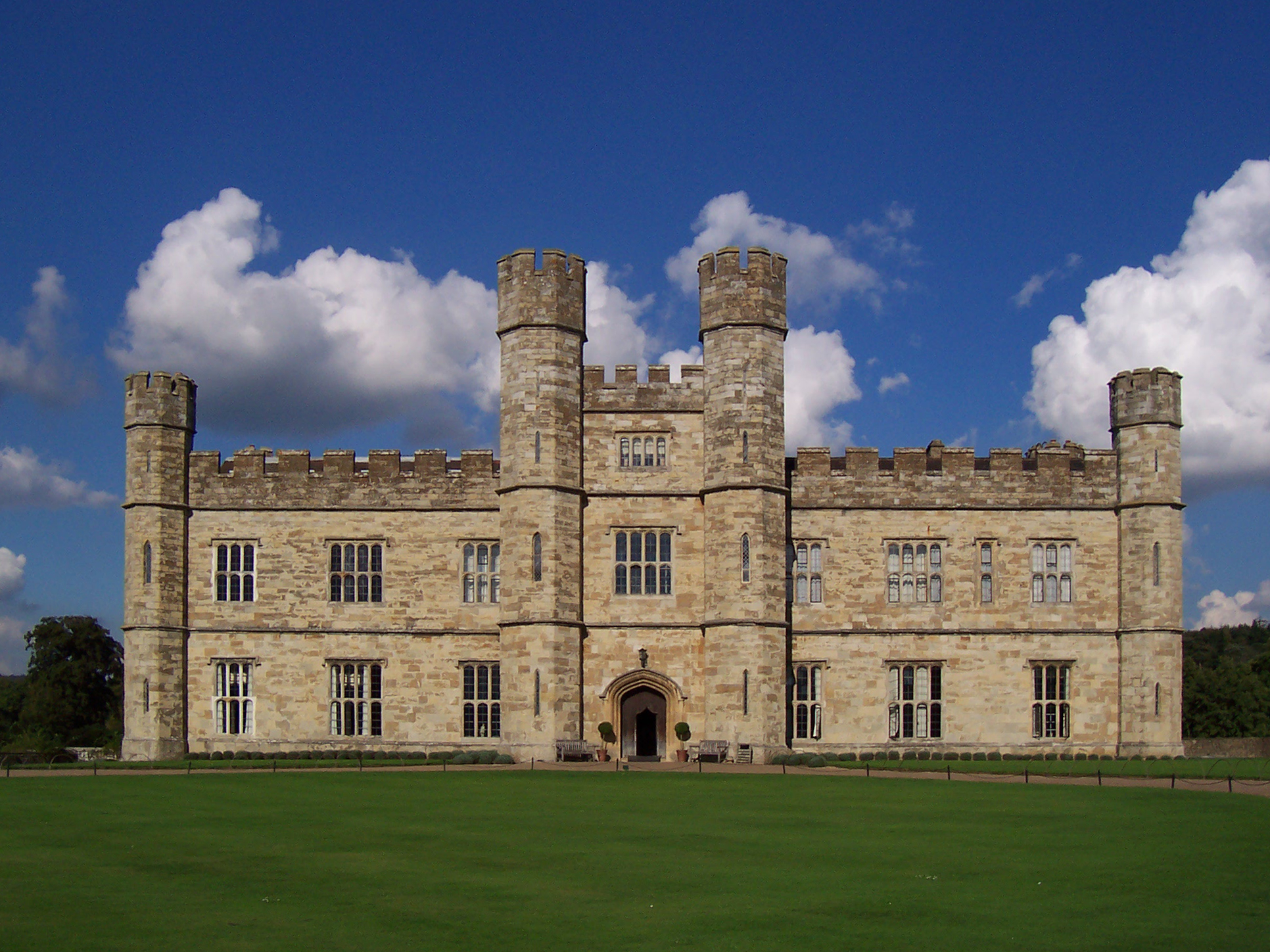
Leeds Castle, which was bought for Cheney and his brothers by his father, who later disinherited him

== Family ==
He married his cousin Elizabeth Stede, daughter of Sir John Stede of Harrietsham (the common ancestor was Joan Pordage, who married firstly William Stede and secondly Francis Colepeper). They had two surviving daughters, Cicely, who married William Cage (died 1676) of Milgate House, Thurnham, a lawyer, by whom she was the mother of the politician William Cage (died 1738), and Elizabeth, fourth wife of Christopher Milles of Herne Bay. Elizabeth was still alive in 1710, when we found her corresponding with her cousin, the writer Elizabeth Freke (who was the daughter of Sir Cheney's sister, the elder Cecily).

== Hartlib circle ==
Of the Hartlibians, he had most to do with Benjamin Worsley. He was interested in alchemy, but most of all in agricultural topics. While on the Parliamentarian side, he was a moderate, against the more theocratic tendencies. He had contacts in Parliament; but insufficient influence to make a real difference in the attitude to Hartlib's projects.
