= Christian Ravis =

German orientalist and theologian

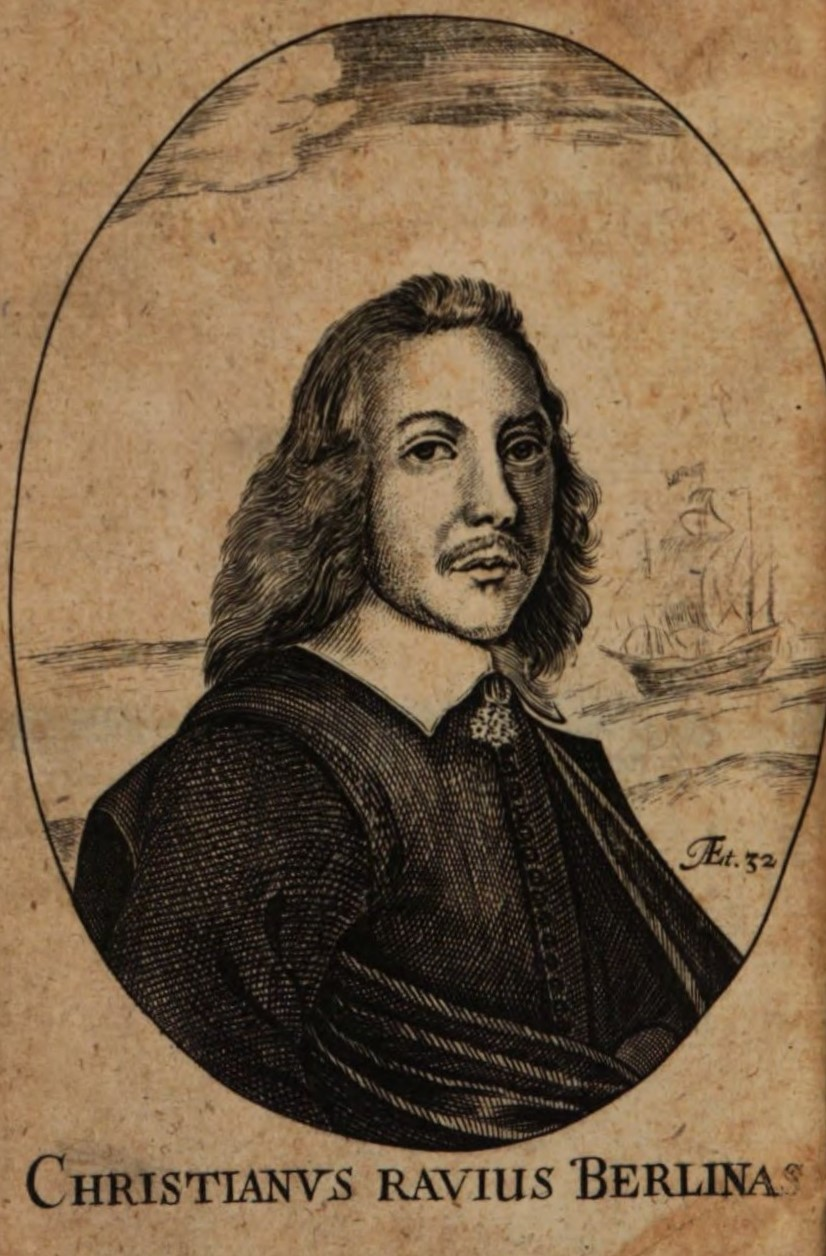
Christian Ravis

Christian Ravis (1613–1677) was an itinerant German orientalist and theologian.

It has been questioned whether Ravis really mastered the languages he claimed to teach: whether his competence extended further than Turkish. His reputation with Jacobus Golius was undermined by Nicolaus Petri of Aleppo, who worked for Ravis copying manuscripts.

== Life ==
He was son of John Raue, deacon of the Nikolaikirche at Berlin, and was born on 25 January 1613 at Berlin, where he went to school at Berlinisches Gymnasium zum Grauen Kloster. In 1630 he began the study of theology and oriental languages at Wittenberg, where he graduated M.A. in 1636. The same year he visited Stockholm, where he made the acquaintance of Peter, son of Hugo Grotius, and in 1637 Hamburg, Upsala, Copenhagen, Leyden, and Amsterdam.

Crossing to England in 1638, he fixed his quarters at Oxford, and corresponded with Archbishop James Ussher, who made him an allowance of £24 a year towards the expenses of a projected journey to the Levant in quest of manuscripts. He left England in 1639, and, passing through Paris, was introduced by Grotius to Richelieu, whose offer of a post in the French diplomatic service he declined. His money from Ussher was forwarded by Samuel Hartlib. At Smyrna he lodged with the British consul, Edward Stringer, while he acquired knowledge of the spoken languages of the Levant.

He then proceeded to Constantinople, where Edward Pococke procured him free quarters at the British embassy. He returned to Europe in 1642 with a collection of oriental manuscripts, and lectured at London (1642), where he was supported by Ussher and John Selden. He taught at Utrecht (1643), Amsterdam (1645) where he met John Pell and gave him an Arabic manuscript of Apollonius. Back in England in 1648, he was sponsored to give lectures in oriental languages for Sion College. In Oxford, where he took the covenant, he was elected fellow of Magdalen College and taught Hebrew. His book, A Generall Grammer for the Ebrew, Samaritan, Calde, Syriac, Arabic, and Ethiopic Tongue, was published in London in 1648. In this work he makes the eccentric argument that these six languages are in fact not merely related but all one language. Failing to obtain the chair of Arabic at Oxford, he accepted an offer of employment from Christina of Sweden, who appointed him professor of oriental languages at Upsala in 1650. Starting in 1669 he lectured on oriental languages at Kiel.

In 1672 Frederick William, Elector of Brandenburg procured him a chair at Frankfort-on-the-Oder, where he died on 21 June 1677, and was buried in the Oberkirche.
