= Barbara Kiefer Lewalski =

American academic (1931–2018)

- Born: February 22, 1931; Topeka, Kansas, U.S.
- Died: March 2, 2018 (aged 87); Providence, Rhode Island, U.S.

Academic background
- Education: Emporia State University; University of Chicago

Academic work
- Institutions: Harvard University; Brown University

Barbara Josephine Lewalski (née Kiefer; February 22, 1931 – March 2, 2018) was an American academic, an authority on Renaissance literature particularly known for her work on John Milton.

== Early life ==
Born in Topeka, Kansas, to John Kiefer, a farmer, and Vivo (née Hutton), an elementary schoolteacher and speech therapist, she received her BSE at Emporia State University in 1950 and her AM in 1951. She went on to earn a PhD at the University of Chicago in 1956.

== Career ==
Her first book, Milton’s Brief Epic: The Genre, Meaning and Art of Paradise Regained, has been praised as a "trail-blazing" work that marshals "great learning in the service of understanding a specific artefact, without swamping the artefact."

Lewalski was a Guggenheim Fellow in 1967, and was elected a fellow of the American Academy of Arts and Sciences in 1980 and a member of the American Philosophical Society in 1986.

From 1983 to 2010 she was the William R. Kenan, Jr., Professor of English Literature and of History and Literature at Harvard University. From 1956 to 1982 she taught at Brown University, holding the positions of Alumni-Alumnae University Professor (1976–82), Director of Graduate Studies in English (1968–72), and Chair of the Renaissance Studies Program (1976–80).

In 2016, the Renaissance Society of America awarded her the Paul Oskar Kristeller Lifetime Achievement Award for recognition of her decades of scholarship.

Lewalski died in Providence, Rhode Island, at the age of 87. She had congestive heart failure and died of a heart attack on March 2, 2018.

== Works ==
- Milton's Brief Epic (1966)
- Donne's "Anniversaries" and the Poetry of Praise: The Creation of a Symbolic Mode (1973)
- Protestant Poetics and the Seventeenth-Century English Lyric (1979)
- Paradise Lost and the Rhetoric of Literary Forms (1985)
- Writing Women in Jacobean England (1993)
- (editor) The Polemics and Poems of Rachel Speght (1996)
- The Life of John Milton: A Critical Biography (2000)
- (editor) John Milton, Paradise Lost (2007)
