= Johann Heinrich Bisterfeld =

Johann Heinrich Bisterfeld (1605 – 16 February 1655) was a German polymath, active as a philosopher, logician and encyclopedic writer from Siegen. A follower of Ramus and pupil of Johann Heinrich Alsted at the Herborn Academy (Academia Nassauensis), Bisterfeld became head of the academy in Weissenburg (Alba Iulia) in Transylvania, where he died.

== Works ==
- Philosophiae primae seminarium, 1652 ( second edition: Lugduni Batavorum, 1657).
- Elementorum logicorum libri tres, Lugduni Batavorum, 1657.
- Bisterfeldius redivivus, Hagae-Comitum, 1661, appeared posthumously in two volumes, the first being Alphabeti philosophici libri tres, on universal language and the second Logica disputandi; this work is considered an influence on Leibniz.
