= John Beale (writer) =

English clergyman and scientific writer

- Born: 1608; Yarkhill, Herefordshire, England
- Died: 1683 (aged 74–75)
- Education: King's School, Worcester, Eton College
- Alma mater: King's College, Cambridge
- Occupations: Clergyman, Scientific Writer
- Parents: Thomas Beale (father); Joanna Pye (mother)

John Beale (c.1608 – 1683) was an English clergyman, scientific writer, and early Fellow of the Royal Society. He contributed to John Evelyn's Sylva, or A Discourse of Forest-Trees and the Propagation of Timber, and was an influential author on orchards and cider. He was also a member of the Hartlib Circle.

== Life ==
He was born in Yarkhill, Herefordshire, the son of Thomas Beale, a lawyer and farmer, and Joanna Pye; he was a nephew of Robert Pye and Walter Pye. He was educated at the King's School, Worcester by Henry Bright, who is thought to have nurtured his early study of Erasmus, and then at Eton College, before going to King's College, Cambridge in 1629. In his own account he had a photographic memory, and had early read in Melanchthon, Johannes Magirus and Zacharias Ursinus; he read philosophy to the King's students for two years. Thomas Birch identifies this period as the time when Ramism and Calvinism fell out of fashion there. He graduated B.A. in 1633, M.A. in 1636, and was Fellow from 1632 to 1640. He travelled on the continent in the late 1630s, and was rector of Sock Dennis, Somerset from 1638.

Beale proposed an art of memory to Samuel Hartlib, in 1656. Hartlib, writing to Robert Boyle in 1658, said of Beale: "There is not the like man in the whole island". He became rector of Yeovil, Somerset, in 1660.

In January, 1663 he was elected a Fellow of the Royal Society.

== Works ==
His works are:

- Aphorisms concerning Cider, printed in John Evelvn's Sylva 1664, and entitled in the later editions of that work, General Advertisements concerning Cider.
- Herefordshire Orchards, a Pattern for all England, written in an Epistolary Address to Samuel Hartlib, Esq. By I. B., Lond. 1656; reprinted in Richard Bradley's New Improvements of Planting and Gardening, 1724 and 1739.
- Papers in the Philosophical Transactions.
- Letters to Robert Boyle, printed in the 5th volume of Boyle's works.

== Notes ==
- This article incorporates text from a publication now in the public domain: "Beale, John". Dictionary of National Biography. London: Smith, Elder & Co. 1885–1900.
