= Benjamin Worsley =

English physician and civil servant

Benjamin Worsley (1618–1673) was an English physician, Surveyor-General of Ireland, experimental scientist, civil servant and intellectual figure of Commonwealth England. He studied at Trinity College, Dublin, but may not have graduated.

His survey of land in Ireland was of land claimed by Oliver Cromwell under the Act of Settlement. Worsley was from 1651 a physician in Cromwell's army, but took to surveying around 1653. His work was too rough-and-ready to be of practical help to arranging land grants to soldiers, and William Petty took over.

He was an alchemical writer, and associate of Robert Boyle, and knew George Starkey from 1650. He was a major figure of the Invisible College of the 1640s.

Worsley associated with the circle around Samuel Hartlib and John Dury, and on their behalf visited Johann Rudolph Glauber in 1648-9. Worsley followed the theories of Michael Sendivogius and Clovis Hesteau. He was a projector in the manufacture of saltpeter (1646). Later, probably in the mid-1650s, he wrote De nitro theses quaedam. He also took up the alchemy of transmutation, with Johann Moriaen and Johannes Sibertus Kuffler.

He was also probably heterodox in religion.
