= Arnold Boate =

Dutch physician, writer and Hebraist

Arnold Boate, originally called de Boot (1606–1653) was a Dutch physician, writer and Hebraist who spent much of his life abroad, and lived for several years in Dublin. There he married Margaret Dongan, a judge's daughter, whom he portrayed lovingly in his book The Character of a Truly Virtuous and Pious Woman. He was the brother of Gerard Boate, author of The Natural History of Ireland, for which Arnold supplied much of the material. Both Gerard and Arnold were members of the Hartlib circle.

== Background ==
Born Arnold de Boot in Gorinchem in the Netherlands, he was a younger son of the Dutch knight Godfried de Boot (c.1570-1625) and his wife Christine van Loon. Like his brother, he attended the University of Leiden and qualified as a doctor of medicine. He also developed a deep interest in Hebrew studies and in particular the correct reading of the Old Testament. His first book, co-written with Francis Taylor and entitled Examen Praefationis Morini in Biblia Graeca de Textus Ebraici et Graeci authoritate was published in Leiden in 1630.

== Career ==
He and his brother Gerard moved to London about 1630 to practice medicine. It was said that they became involved in a dispute with the Royal College of Physicians, but Arnold was lucky enough to become personal physician to Robert Sidney, 2nd Earl of Leicester. Leicester was later appointed Lord Deputy of Ireland and, though he never actually went to Ireland, he may have recommended Arnold to his Irish friends. Arnold's writings had already brought him to the attention of James Ussher, Archbishop of Armagh, and it was Ussher who invited Arnold to Ireland in 1636. He became Ussher's personal physician, and was later appointed Surgeon-General to the Irish Army. He also built up a flourishing private practice among the Dutch community in Dublin.

In 1641 Gerard and Arnold co-wrote Philosophia Naturalis Reformata, an attack upon Aristotelianism. Arnold's experience as an army doctor also led him to write Diverse remarkable passages .. of our Army in Ireland (1642) and Observationes medicae de affectibus a veteribus omissis (1649).

His marriage, which was a love match, to Margaret Dongan, daughter of Thomas Dongan, judge of the Court of King's Bench (Ireland) and his first wife Grace Palmer, strengthened his ties with the Irish Protestant ruling class, although his father-in-law, according to Elrington Ball, was not much respected, partly because he was known to be a Roman Catholic who conformed to the Protestant faith only for the purpose of his career. Arnold, however, wrote of Dongan in his memoir of Margaret with affection and respect. Dongan was a wealthy man, but suffered heavy losses during the Irish Rebellion of 1641. Arnold's sympathies were with the Cromwellian cause and he is said to have acted as a spy for Oliver Cromwell. In 1644 Arnold decided to quit Ireland. He moved briefly to stay with his brother in London but then settled permanently in Paris. He is said to have spied for Cromwell on English Royalists while in Paris. Much of his later career was spent in scholarly dispute with Louis Capel, who had questioned his Biblical readings and the result was a lengthy pamphlet war, involving several scholars on both sides, including Ussher.

Like his brother, he was a member of the Hartlib Circle, the circle of scholars who corresponded with Samuel Hartlib on scientific, religious and political issues, and he is credited with having established the Irish branch of the circle; even after he left Ireland he acted as a conduit between Hartlib and Ussher. Gerard's most famous work The Natural History of Ireland was written, at Hartlib's suggestion, from material collected by Arnold. After Gerard's death in 1650 Hartlib suggested that Arnold continue the work, but Arnold himself died in Paris in 1653.

== Family ==
On Christmas Day 1642 Arnold married Margaret Dongan (1626-1651). Of their three children two died young. Mariana, their only surviving daughter, married Marcus Beyerman. Margaret died in April 1651 from complications during pregnancy.

Arnold was devoted to his wife, and shortly after her death he published a remarkable tribute, The Character of a Truly Virtuous and Pious Woman as it has been acted by Mistress Margaret Dongan, which was dedicated to Thomas Sydserf, Bishop of Galloway. It paints a picture of a young woman who was notable for beauty, religious fervour, kindness, peaceful nature, charity and family loyalty

== Works ==
- Examen Praefationis Morini in Biblia Graeca de Textus Ebraici Corruptione et Graeca Authoritate (co-authored with Francis Taylor) (1630)
- Philosophia Naturalis Reformata (co-author) (1641)
- A Remonstrance on Diverse Remarkable Passages by our Army (1642)
- Animadversiones sacrae ad textum Hebraicum veteris testemetnti (1644)
- Observationes medicae de affectibus a veteribus omissis (1649)
- De textus Hebraici veteris tetementi certitudine (1650)
- The Character of a Truly Virtuous and Pious Woman... (1651)
- Arnoldi Booti vindiciae... (1653)
