= George Starkey =

Colonial American alchemist, medical practitioner and writer

George Starkey (1628–1665) was a Colonial American alchemist, medical practitioner, and writer of numerous commentaries and chemical treatises that were widely circulated in Western Europe and influenced prominent men of science, including Robert Boyle and Isaac Newton. After relocating from New England to London, England, in 1650, Starkey began writing under the pseudonym Eirenaeus Philalethes. Starkey remained in England and continued his career in medicine and alchemy until his death in the Great Plague of London in 1665.

== Early life ==
Starkey was born in Bermuda, the first of at least five children of George Stirk, a Scottish minister and devoted Calvinist, and Elizabeth Painter. During his early years in Bermuda, Starkey displayed interest in natural history, as evidenced by his written entomological observations of various insects indigenous to Bermuda. After the death of his father in 1637, Starkey was sent to New England, where he continued his early education before enrolling at Harvard College in 1643 at the age of 15. Introduced to alchemical theory, he would later stylise himself as the "Philosopher by Fire." After graduating from Harvard in 1646, Starkey resided in the Boston area and earned a living practising medicine while at the same time experimenting in chemical technology.

Despite his successful medical practice, Starkey immigrated at age 22 to London, England, in November 1650 with his wife, Susanna Stoughton, whom he had married earlier that year. Susanna is believed to be the eldest daughter of Colonel Israel Stoughton, and sister of William Stoughton, a future Lt. Governor of Massachusetts. It is not entirely known why Starkey decided to leave New England. One clue points to his interest in alchemy and chemical technology. It is known that Starkey was acquiring great skill at building ovens to facilitate alchemical experiments. However, he complained that the region offered unsuitable material needed for their operation, and therefore believed that relocating to England could provide access to better material and higher quality laboratory implements as well. Around this same time he changed his surname to Starkey for reasons that are unknown.

Once in England, Starkey's reputation as an alchemist and chymical furnace maker grew among the scientific community and he soon acquired a network of colleagues from the circle of friends and correspondents of Samuel Hartlib – a group of social reformers, utopians, and natural philosophers. Within a few years, however, Starkey found himself in financial trouble and was consequently incarcerated because of debt—possibly twice sometime in late 1653 and again in mid-1654. Imprisoned for a brief period of time, Starkey returned to the practice of alchemy and medicine upon his release in late 1654. Additionally, he wrote and published a number of popular treatises. Yet, his most important work was written under several pseudonyms during the period prior to imprisonment when he was associated with the Hartlib circle. The most famous of these works, the Introitus apertus ad occlusum regis palatium, was published in 1667 after his death.

== Education ==
Little is known of Starkey's early education. Prior to the death of his father in 1637, Starkey most likely was tutored, perhaps by his parents or learned acquaintances of the family. After the death of the elder Stirk, Starkey was sent to New England around 1639 to continue his studies. In 1643 he matriculated at Harvard College, where he was exposed to a core curriculum in the classical languages and theology in addition to courses in logic, physics, mathematics, politics, and history. His studies soon focused on chemical philosophy and alchemist theory. Starkey earned his A.B. in 1646 and his A.M. by 1649, although the exact date is uncertain. During his years at Harvard, Starkey was introduced to alchemy through the physics curriculum, which included subjects on metallic transmutation and potable gold. In addition, he acquired a thorough understanding of corpuscular matter theory that was important to his alchemist work throughout his career.

== Career ==
During his final years at Harvard, Starkey became increasingly occupied with the practice of medicine. He was a devoted follower of the Flemish iatrochemist Jan Baptist van Helmont, and had been tutored in the practical applications of metallurgy. His medical practice appears to have been highly successful, which included iatrochemistry. Despite his flourishing practice, Starkey decided England could provide better access to the tools required by an alchemist, which prompted him to sail for London with his wife in November 1650.

Upon his arrival in London, Starkey's credentials as an alchemist were quickly established. He acquired immediate acclaim in England as an alchemical savant, due in part to the well-connected network of scientific practitioners and colleagues he had been associated with in New England. It was at this time that the transplanted New England alchemist became involved with the Hartlib circle and the fictitious identity of Eirenaeus Philalethes (a peaceful lover of truth) emerged as a result of currents swirling within the group. Samuel Hartlib was a patron and promoter of applied science, including alchemy and iatrochemistry. Yet, there were individuals within this circle dedicated to preserving secrecy and the protection of knowledge, which may have initially inspired Starkey's alternate identity.

Starkey's move to London was followed by remarkable success in establishing a medical practice and producing and administering medicinal remedies to patients, including Robert Boyle. However, despite his success, Starkey abandoned his patients in 1651 to pursue the "secrets" of alchemy, which included the production of pharmaceuticals and the transmutation of metallic substances. For example, Starkey's "sophic mercury" was an amalgam of antimony, silver, and mercury, which was supposed to dissolve gold into a mixture that when heated, would produce the mythical philosopher's stone, an agent for transmuting base metals into noble ones. It is also known that Starkey tutored Boyle in the practice of chemistry and experimentation, although Boyle never acknowledged Starkey's tutelage.

As the inventor of curative drugs and philosophical mercuries, it is reasonable to assume that Starkey was concerned with guarding these inventions and preserving his trade secrets. The pseudonym "Philalethes" allowed him to accomplish this by creating a fictitious identity under which a series of manuscripts and tracts were produced that proclaimed these discoveries while advertising that access to concealed alchemical knowledge might be obtained through Starkey, a "friend" of Philalethes and guardian of his manuscripts. It is also believed that Starkey's interest in concealing his work was driven by a desire to fashion himself as the "master of secrets" whose discoveries were "divinely sanctioned revelations." Certainly this might lift Starkey's socioprofessional standing in the minds of influential patrons within the Hartlib circle.

A few years after arriving in London, Starkey began to suffer from his own success. A variety of projects, from the manufacture of perfumes and pharmaceuticals to the production of sophic mercuries, were pulling him in different directions, straining professional relationships, and failed to generate sufficient income. The cost to personally fund these projects was leaving him financially unstable as debts increased. Finally, in 1653–1654, Starkey's creditors caught up with him. He was imprisoned twice for debt, and when not in prison, he avoided creditors by concealing his whereabouts. To make matters worse, he had lost the support of the Hartlib circle. It was necessary that a beleaguered Starkey reestablish his financial footing, restore his reputation, and attract new patronage.

The final years of Starkey's life were devoted to resurrecting his medical practice and manufacturing income-producing medicines. However, he never wandered far from his chymistry lab and his quest for Van Helmont's alchahest or the philosophers' stone. No doubt he continued his search for the perfect liquor alchahest, a medicinal solvent whose purpose was similar to theriac, an antidotal compound that was consumed to preserve health and prevent illness. Starkey's success in producing his alchahest was limited, and his quest for the philosophers' stone never came to fruition. Although he continued to produce medical treatises, three political pamphlets that he wrote in 1660 along with public disputes he engaged in with other medical practitioners and the Royal College of Physicians further tainted his career.

In 1665, the plague found London and George Starkey. For all of his belief in the ability of the Helmontian medicines to cure disease and prevent illness, the Helmontian alchahest Starkey prepared to combat the plague was ineffective. To the end, Starkey remained faithful to the Flemish iatrochemist that he revered.

== Legacy ==
George Starkey's alchemical laboratory expertise and formalised methodology were highly respected by the scientific community and became the basis for later practices in eighteenth-century experimental chemistry. His influence on Boyle's work and discoveries in chemistry is indisputable. It is perhaps the survival of Starkey's laboratory journals that is most important, for they provide the least opaque window through which to view the laboratory operations and methodological practices of a seventeenth-century alchemist. Also, Starkey's written works, especially under the name Philalethes, were widely circulated and enormously popular. They were read by notable men of science in the seventeenth century and well into the eighteenth century, to include Boyle, Locke, Leibniz, and Newton. Indeed, his writings were influential in the emerging field of chymistry by advancing the doctrine that chemical phenomena are the result of the interaction of insensible particles accompanied by chemical forces. Although George Starkey will probably never be regarded as a canonical figure in early modern science, his achievements nevertheless are significant and contribute to a wider understanding of the nature of science during this period and its historical development.

== Original published works ==
Works published under George Starkey's name:

1. The Reformed Commonwealth of Bees (1655).
2. Nature's Explication and Helmont's Vindication; or a short and sure Way to a long and sound life (London, 1657).
3. Pyrotechny asserted and illustrated (London, 1658).
4. The admirable efficacy of oyl which is made of Sulphur-Vive (1660).
5. The dignity of kinship asserted (1660).
6. Britains Triumph FOR HER Imparallel'd Deliverance (1660).
7. Royal and other innocent blood crying aloud to heaven for due vengeance (1660).
8. An appendix to the Unlearned Alchimist Wherein is contained the true Receipt of that Excellent Diaphoretick and Diuretick PILL (1663).
9. George Starkey's Pill vindicated From the unlearned Alchymist and all other pretenders, (undated).
10. A brief Examination and Censure OF Several Medicines (1664).
11. A smart Scourge for a silly, sawcy Fool, an answer to letter at the end of a pamphlet of Lionel Lockyer (1664).
12. An Epistolar discourse to the Learned and Deservingauthor of Galeno-pale (1665).
13. Loimologia A Consolatory Advice And some brief observations Concerning the Present Pest, 1665.
14. Liquor Alchahest, or a discourse of that Immortal Dissolvent of Paracelsus & Helmont, 1675.

Works published under the name of Philalethes.

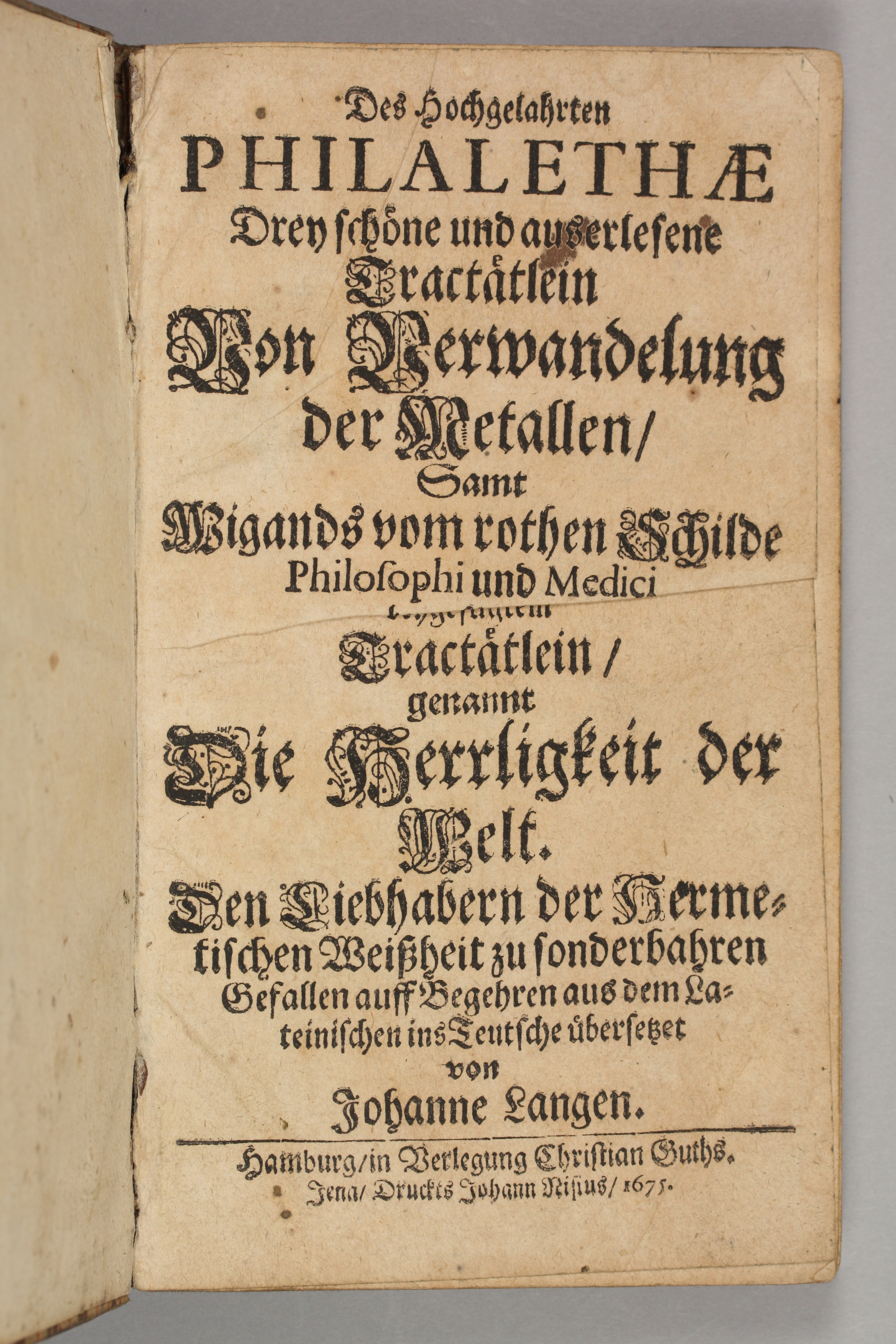
Drey schöne und auserlesene Tractätlein von Verwandelung der Metallen, 1675

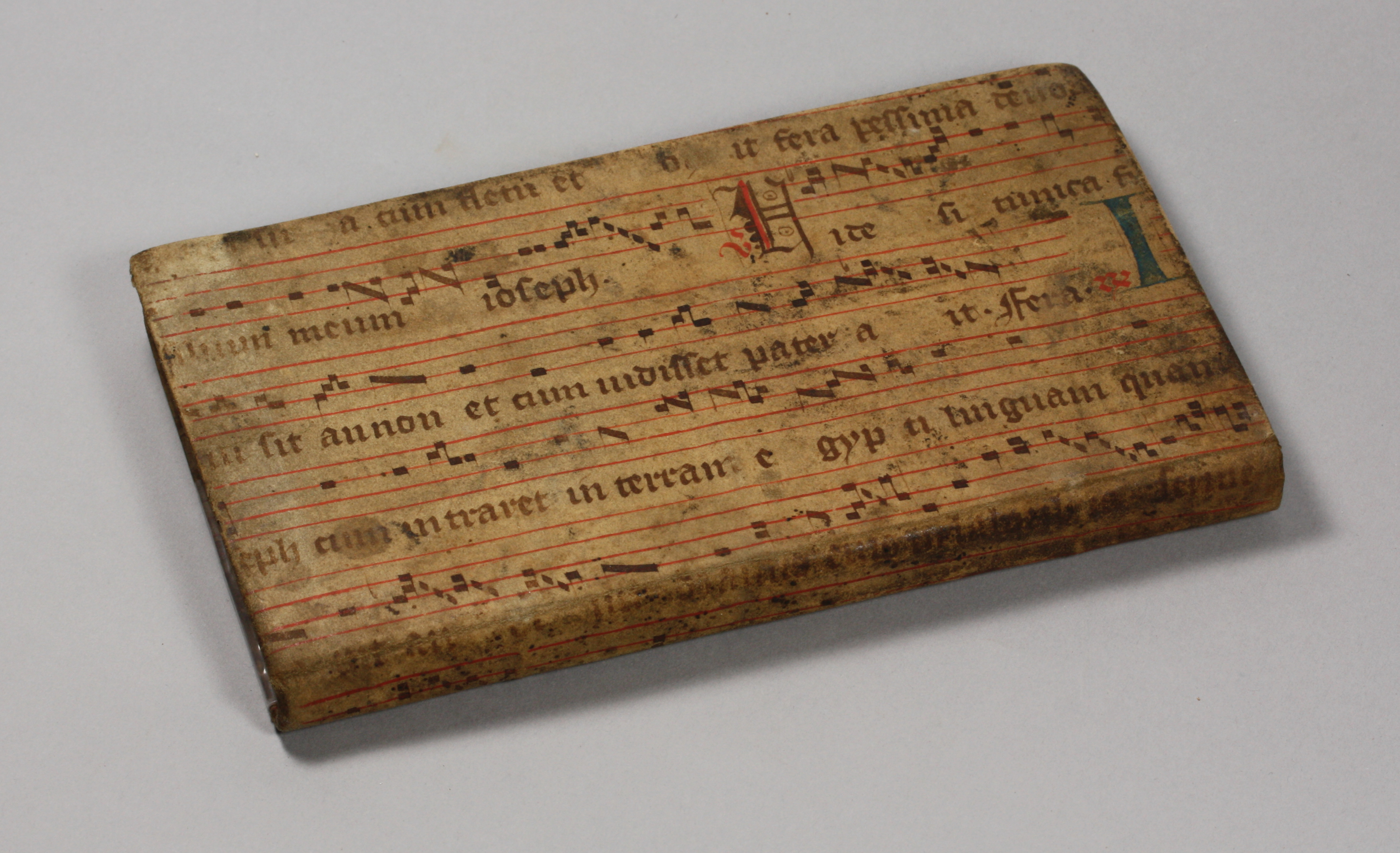
Cover, Drey schöne, 1675

First printings of Philalethes' tracts were published between 1654 and 1683:

- The Marrow of Alchemy, being an Experimental Treatise, Discovering the secret and most hidden Mystery of the Philosophers Elixer. London, UK. 1654. OCLC 607038829.
- Introitus apertus ad occlusum regis palatium (in Latin). Amstelodami: J. Janssonium. 1667. OCLC 883665686, 759830067, 776846193.

Subsequently translated as:
Secrets reveal'd; or, An open entrance to the shut-palace of the King, containing the greatest treasure in chymistry never yet so plainly discovered. London: W. Godbid for William Cooper. 1669. OCLC 904722035.

- Three Tracts of the Great Medicine of Philosophers for Humane and Metalline Bodies (Amsterdam, 1668, in Latin; London, 1694, in English)
  - The Art of the Transmutation of Metals
  - A short Manuduction to the Caelestial Ruby
  - The Fountain of Chymical Philosophy
- An Exposition upon Sir George Ripley's Epistle to King Edward IV (London 1677, in English)
- An Exposition upon Sir George Ripley's Preface (London 1677, in English)
- An Exposition upon the First Six Gates of Sir George Ripley's Compound of Alchymie (London 1677, in English)
- Experiments for the Preparation of the Sophick Mercury; by Luna, and the Antimonial-Stellate-Regulus of Mars, for the Philosophers Stone (London 1677, in English)
- A breviary of Alchemy, or a commentary upon Sir George Ripley's Recapitulation: Being A Paraphrastical Epitome of his Twelve Gates (London 1677, in English)
- An Exposition upon Sir George Ripley's Vision (London 1677, in English)
- Ripley Reviv'd, or an Exposition upon Sir George Ripley's Hermetico-Poetical Works (London 1678, in English)
- Opus tripartitum (London&Amsterdam, 1678, in Latin)
- Enarratio methodica trium Gebri medicinarum, in quibus contenitur Lapidis Philosophici vera confectio (Amsterdam, 1678, Latin)
- The Secret of the Immortal Liquor called Alkahest (London, 1683, English & Latin)

A number of these tracts, including the Three tracts and the Introitus were also included in the Musaeum Hermeticum of 1678.

All English works of Philalethes have been recently compiled in one volume.

== Bibliography ==
- Mendelsohn, Andrew J. "Alchemy and Politics in England 1649—1665." Past & Present, no. 135 (May 1992): 30–78.
- Newman, William R. Gehennical Fire: The Lives of George Starkey, an American Alchemist in the Scientific Revolution. Cambridge: Harvard University Press, 1994.
- Findlen, Paula. Possessing Nature: Museums, Collecting, and Scientific Culture in Early Modern Italy. Berkeley: University of California Press, 1996.
- Newman, William R. and Principe, Lawrence M. Alchemy Tried in the Fire: Starkey, Boyle, and the Fate of Helmontian Chymistry. Chicago: The University of Chicago Press, 2002.
- White, Bruce D. and Woodward, Walter W. “’A Most Exquisite Fellow’ – William White and an Atlantic World Perspective on the Seventeenth-Century Chymical Furnace.” Ambix 54, no. 3 (November 2007): 285–298.
