= Gerard Boate =

Dutch physician

Gerard Boate (also Gérard de Boot, Bootius or Botius) (1604, Gorinchem – 1650, Dublin) was a Dutch physician, known for his Natural History of Ireland.

== Life ==
Boate was born Gerrit/Gerard Boot, in Gorinchem, son of the knight Godfried de Boot (c.1570–1625) and of Christine van Loon. He entered the university of Leyden as a medical student and graduated there as doctor of medicine on 3 July 1628. His younger brother Arnold Boate (1606–1653) followed him to study medicine in Leiden. Both moved to London around 1630, where their family had settled earlier. Gerard became employed as physician to Charles I of England and Arnold as physician to the Earl of Leicester. In 1631 in London Gerard married Catharina (or Katherine) Menning (or Manning) with whom he had three children. The writer Dorothy Durie's first husband Arthur Moore died in April 1635 in Dublin. She moved with her children to London where she stayed with Gerald and Katherine Boate. She lost a lot of her wealth in Ireland and before she left for The Hague in 1642 she sold some other lands in Ireland to Katherine Boate.

Boate became a contributor to the fund under the English act of parliament of 1642, which admitted the Dutch to subscribe money for the reduction of the Irish, to be subsequently repaid by grant of forfeited lands in Ireland. He was admitted a licentiate of the College of Physicians on 6 November 1646. In April 1649 the appointment of Boate as doctor to the hospital at Dublin was referred by the council of state in London to Oliver Cromwell, who had just been appointed commander-in-chief for Ireland. The treasurer-at-war in the following September paid Boate fifty pounds, as physician for Ireland.

Boate arrived in Ireland at the latter end of 1649, while Cromwell was in command there, but he survived only a short time. He died in January 1650. In repayment of Boate's contributions, his widow Katherine Boate, obtained, under certificate dated 15 November 1667, over one thousand acres of land in Tipperary. They had several children, including Gerard, the eldest son and heir, and a younger son, Godfrey. Among their descendants was the High Court judge Godfrey Boate, who is chiefly remembered for the mocking elegy on his death by Jonathan Swift. The Boate lands passed by inheritance to the Hemsworth family.

== Works ==
In 1630 he published a book styled 'Horæ Jucundæ.' With his brother Arnold, he produced a treatise on philosophy, Philosophia Naturalis Reformata, published in 1641.

To support the interest of adventurers subscribing for potential Irish lands, he undertook the compilation of a work to supply information on Irish produce. Boate himself had never visited Ireland, but materials for his work were furnished by his brother Arnold and by some of the English who had been expelled by the Irish rebellion of 1641. Boate started the 'Natural History' early in 1645 and completed it within the year, but its publication was deferred.

Boate's papers and his 'Natural History' left behind him in London came into the hands of Samuel Hartlib. With the assent of Arnold Boate, then in Paris, the 'Natural History' was published in London in 1652 by Hartlib, with a dedication to Oliver Cromwell and Charles Fleetwood, commander-in-chief in Ireland. In his dedication, Hartlib observed:

I lookt also somewhat upon the hopefull appearance of replanting Ireland shortly, not only by the adventurers, but happily by the calling in of exiled Bohemians and other Protestants also, and happily by the invitation of some well affected out of the Low Countries, which to advance are thoughts suitable to your noble genius, and to further the settlement thereof, the Natural History of that countrie will not be unfit, but very subservient.

The 'Natural History' is divided into twenty-four chapters. In a letter, dated Paris, 10 August, prefixed to the volume and addressed to Hartlib, Arnold Boate stated that his brother had contemplated three more books on the plants, 'living creatures,’ and natives of Ireland respectively. A French version, under the title of 'Histoire Naturelle d'Irlande,’ was published in Paris in 1666. A quarto edition of the 'Natural History' by Boate was published in Dublin in 1726, and reissued there in 1755. It was again published in the first volume of a 'Collection of Tracts and Treatises illustrative of the Natural History, Antiquities, and Political and Social State of Ireland,’ Dublin, 1860.

His observations on the severe flooding which periodically afflicts the River Dodder in Dublin are still topical. He was the first person to note that the river cannot contain the amount of water which pours into it during a period of heavy rainfall. The problem has never been solved.
