= Johann Moriaen =

German alchemist and early chemist (c. 1591–1668)

Johann Moriaen (born Nuremberg c.1591-1668) was a German alchemist and early chemist, known as an associate of Samuel Hartlib. He was active in recruiting for Hartlib's network of intellectuals, the Hartlib Circle, and communicating with them. He was a convinced pansophist.

With no published works, his activities have been uncovered by recent scholarship. He operated from Amsterdam.

He matriculated at Heidelberg University in 1611, where he knew Georg Vechner, later an associate of Johann Amos Comenius. He then became a Calvinist minister. He moved to Cologne, where he perhaps met Theodore Haak who was there in 1626. He gave up the ministry and returned to his native Nuremberg in 1627, then full of refugees from the Thirty Years War.

He met Isaac Beeckman in Dordrecht in 1633. He at this time was involved in practical aspects of optics and Paracelsian chemistry and medicine. He moved permanently to the Netherlands five years later.

In 1657 he is recorded as the owner of a scarlet dye works in Hulkestein near Arnhem.

His Dutch connections included the Hebraist Adam Boreel, and businessman Louis de Geer, a supporter of Comenius. His correspondents included George Starkey.
