= Samuel Hartlib =

English polymath of German origin (c. 1600–1662)

Samuel Hartlib or Hartlieb (c. 1600 – 10 March 1662) was a polymath of German-Polish origin, who settled, married and died in England. He was the son of Georg Hartlieb, a German merchant in Elbing (Elbląg), whose family had migrated to Poland at the beginning of the 16th century, and Elizabeth Langthon, a daughter of a rich English merchant in Danzig (Gdańsk). Hartlib was a noted promoter and writer in fields that included science, medicine, agriculture, politics and education. He was a contemporary of Robert Boyle, whom he knew well, and a neighbour of Samuel Pepys in Axe Yard, London, in the early 1660s. He studied briefly at the University of Cambridge upon arriving in England.

== Life ==
Hartlib was born in Elbląg (Elbing), Royal Prussia, Polish-Lithuanian Commonwealth. His mother was the daughter of a rich English merchant in Danzig (Gdańsk). The family of his father, Georg Hartlieb, migrated from Germany to Poland at the beginning of the 16th century. His father was Protestant and settled in Poznań. Due to increasing persecution of Protestants, Georg Hartlieb left Poznań in 1579, relocating first to Danzig and shortly thereafter to Elbing, where he established himself as a successful businessman. Samuel Hartlib studied at the Gymnasium in Brieg (Brzeg) and at the Albertina. He went on to Herborn Academy, where he studied under Johannes Heinrich Alsted and Johannes Bisterfeld. Although briefly at the University of Cambridge, supported by John Preston, he does not seem to have formally studied there.

Hartlib met the Scottish preacher John Dury in 1628. In the same year, Hartlib relocated to England, faced with the prospect of being caught in a war zone, as Imperial armies moved into the western parts of Poland and the chance of intervention by Sweden grew. He first unsuccessfully set up a school in Chichester, in line with his theories of education, and in 1630 moved permanently to London, living in Duke's Place, Holborn. An early patron was John Williams, the Bishop of Lincoln, who was leading the clerical opposition to Archbishop William Laud. Another supporter was John Pym; Pym would use Hartlib later, as a go-between with Dutch Calvinists in London, in an effort to dig up evidence against Laud. Hugh Trevor-Roper argues in his essay Three Foreigners (referring to Hartlib, Dury and the absent Comenius) that Hartlib and the others were the "philosophers" of the "country party" or anti-court grouping of the 1630s and early 1640s, united in their support for these outside voices if agreeing on little else.

During the Civil War, Hartlib occupied himself with the peaceful study of agriculture, publishing various works of his own and printing at his own expense several treatises by others on the subject. He planned a school for the sons of gentlemen, to be conducted on new principles, and this probably was the occasion of his friend John Milton's Tractate on Education, addressed to him in 1644, and of William Petty's Two Letters on the same subject, in 1647 and 1648. Another associate in that period was Walter Blith, a noted writer on husbandry.

For his various labours, Hartlib received a pension of £100 from Oliver Cromwell, afterwards increased to £300, as he had spent all his fortune on his experiments. But Hartlib died in poverty: Samuel Pepys in 1660 noted that Hartlib's daughter Nan was penniless. His association with Oliver Cromwell and the Commonwealth resulted in him being sidelined after Charles II's Restoration. He lost his pension, which had already fallen into arrears. Some of his correspondents went so far as to ask for their letters from his archive, fearing they could be compromised by them.

== "Intelligencer" ==
Hartlib is often described as an "intelligencer", and indeed has been called "the Great Intelligencer of Europe". His main aim in life was to further knowledge. He kept in touch with an array of contacts from high philosophers to gentleman farmers. He maintained a voluminous correspondence, lost in 1667, but much recovered since 1945; it is housed in a special Hartlib collection at the University of Sheffield, England.

Hartlib became one of the best-connected intellectual figures of the Commonwealth era. He was responsible for patents, spreading information and fostering learning. He circulated designs for calculators, double-writing instruments, seed machines and siege engines. His letters in German, Latin, English and other languages have been subjected to close modern scholarship.

Hartlib set out with a universalist goal: "to record all human knowledge and to make it universally available for the education of all mankind". His work has been compared to modern internet search engines.

== Family ==
In 1629 Hartlib married Mary Burmingham, daughter of Philip Burmingham; she died about 1660. They had at least six children. His family life is rather poorly documented: one useful source is the Diary of Samuel Pepys, as Pepys was a close neighbour of the Hartlib family in Axe Yard in the early 1660s and a friend of Hartlib's son Samuel Jr, a clerk in government service. Hartlib's daughter Mary married the physician and chemist Frederick Clod, or Clodius, referred to as "Doctor Clodius" in the Diary. Another daughter Anna (Nan) married the merchant, writer and preacher Johannes Roder of Utrecht in 1660, despite her lack of a dowry. Samuel Pepys, a guest at the wedding, described it as an occasion of "very great state, cost and noble company". Always the realist, Pepys thought it an excellent match for Nan: "a great fortune for her to light on, she having nothing in the world". Hartlib, having heard a good deal of this kind of gossip, indignantly denied that he had married off his daughter to gain a share of the Roder fortune, but the marriage was certainly advantageous since Roder's father was a rich man, and because Roder, as a prophet/preacher in the Cromwell years, had foretold the "coming of a king". This worked to his advantage after the return of Charles II.

== Baconian ==
Hartlib was indebted to Francis Bacon for a general theory of education that formed common ground for him and Jan Comenius. Hartlib published two studies of Comenius's work: Conatuum Comenianorum praeludia (1637) and Comenii pansophiae prodromus et didactica dissertatio (1639). He also put effort into getting Comenius, of the Protestant Moravian Brethren, to visit England. John Dury and Comenius were Hartlib's two closest correspondents. The latter had the concept of a "tree of knowledge", continually branching out and growing. He also put his own spin on Bacon's ideas. In 1640 he addressed the English Parliament with his Utopian plans involving a new commonwealth and the advancement of learning. Shortly before the English Civil War broke out, John Gauden preached in 1640 to Parliament, recommending that Dury and Comenius be invited to England and naming Hartlib as a likely contact.

Men like Hartlib and Comenius wanted to make the spread of knowledge easier at a time when most knowledge was not categorised or standardised by any widespread conventions or academic disciplines and libraries were mostly private. They wanted to enlighten, educate and improve society, as religious people who saw this as the work of God. Comenius arrived in England in 1641 – bad timing considering that war was imminent. His presence failed to transform the position in education, though substantial literature grew up, particularly on university reform, where Oliver Cromwell set up a new institution. Comenius left in 1642; under Cromwell elementary schooling was expanded from 1646, and Durham College was founded, with staff from Hartlib's associates.

Bacon had formulated a project for a research institute entitled "Salomon's House" in his New Atlantis of 1624. This theoretical scheme was important for Hartlib, who angled during the 1640s for public funding for it. He failed except for a small pension for himself but gathered like-minded others: Dury, John Milton, Kenelm Digby, William Petty, and his son-in-law Frederick Clod (Clodius).

Milton dedicated his 1644 Of Education to Hartlib, whom he had come to know the year before and who had pressed him to publish his educational ideas. But he gave the Comenian agenda short shrift in the work. Barbara Lewalski considers his dismissive attitude as disingenuous, as he had probably used texts by Comenius in his own teaching. Hezekiah Woodward, linked in the minds of Presbyterians and officialdom with Milton as a dangerous writer, was also significant as an educational follower of Comenius and Bacon and a friend of Hartlib.

== Hartlib Circle – Royal Society ==
The "Hartlib circle" of contacts and correspondents, built up from about 1630, was one of the foundations of the Royal Society of London established a generation later. The relationship, however, is not transparent, as Hartlib and his close supporters, with the exception of William Petty, were excluded from the Royal Society when it was set up in 1660.

== Economics, agriculture, politics ==
The utopian Description of the Famous Kingdome of Macaria appeared under Hartlib's name, but is now thought to be by Gabriel Plattes (1600–1655), a friend of his. A practical project was to establish a workhouse, as part of the Corporation of the Poor of London. This initiative is thought to have been a major influence on the later philanthropic schemes of John Bellers.

In 1641, Hartlib wrote Relation of that which hath been lately attempted to procure Ecclesiastical Peace among Protestants. After Comenius left England, and in particular from 1646 onwards, the Hartlib group agitated for religious reform and toleration, against the Presbyterian dominance in the Long Parliament. They also proposed economic, technical and agricultural improvements, notably through Sir Cheney Culpeper and Henry Robinson. Benjamin Worsley, Secretary to the Council of Trade from 1650, was a Hartlibian.

Hartlib valued knowledge: anything to raise crop yields or cure disease. Agriculture was a great interest. He worked to spread Dutch farming practices in England, such as the use of nitrogenous crops like cabbage to replenish the nitrogen in the soil and raise the next season's yield. In 1652 he issued a second edition of Richard Weston's Discourse of Flanders Husbandry (1645). Hartlib corresponded with many landowners and academics in his quest for knowledge.

From 1650 Hartlib had an interest in and influence on fruit husbandry. A letter on the subject by Sir Richard Child was published in one of his books: Samuel Hartlib, his Legacy, or an Enlargement of the Discourse of Husbandry used in Brabant and Flanders. Hartlib introduced John Beale, another author on orchards, to John Evelyn, who would eventually write an important work in the field, Sylva (1664). In 1655 Hartlib wrote The Reformed Commonwealth of Bees, featuring a transparent glass beehive to a design by Christopher Wren. Evelyn showed him the manuscript of his Elysium Britannicum, at the end of the 1650s.

== Science and medicine ==
The work of Paracelsus, a 16th-century physician and alchemist who made bold claims for his science, was also one of the inspirations to Hartlib and early chemistry. Hartlib was open-minded, and often tested the ideas and theories of his correspondents. For his own trouble with kidney stones, Hartlib took to drinking diluted sulphuric acid – an intended cure that may have contributed to his death.

Hartlib was interested in theories and practices that modern science would deem irrational, or superstitious – for example, sympathetic medicine, based on the idea that things in nature that bore a resemblance to an ailment could be used to treat it. Hence a plant that looked like a snake might be used to treat snake bites, or a yellow herb to treat jaundice.

== Work ==
- Hartlib's 25,000-plus pages of correspondence and notes appeared on CD in 1995. They are available free of charge on the web.
