= Imaginary curve =

Algebraic curve

In algebraic geometry an imaginary curve is an algebraic curve which does not contain any real points.

For example, the set of pairs of complex numbers $(x,y)$ satisfying the equation $x^2+y^2=-1$ forms an imaginary circle, containing points such as $(i,0)$ and $(\frac{5i}{3},\frac{4}{3})$ but not containing any points both of whose coordinates are real.

In some cases, more generally, an algebraic curve with only finitely many real points is considered to be an imaginary curve. For instance, an imaginary line is a line (in a complex projective space) that contains only one real point.

== See also ==
- Imaginary point
- Real line
- Real curve
