= Princess Mary of Orange =

Princess Mary of Orange may refer to:

- Mary, Princess Royal and Princess of Orange (1631–1660)
- Mary II of England (1662–1694), wife of William III of Orange
