= Mary, Princess Royal =

Mary, Princess Royal may refer to:

- Mary, Princess Royal and Princess of Orange (1631–1660), eldest daughter of King Charles I; wife of William II, Prince of Orange (1626–1650)
- Mary, Princess Royal and Countess of Harewood (1897–1965), only daughter of King George V; wife of Henry Lascelles, 6th Earl of Harewood (1882–1947)
