= Abel Tassin d'Alonne =

Dutch courtier and diplomat (1646–1723)

Abel Tassin d'Alonne (Note: The surname is also sometimes spelled as Tasien d'Alonne, for instance in De Leeuw (1999) and (2000), Huygens and Thompson.) (The Hague, 1646 – The Hague, 24 October 1723) was a Dutch courtier and diplomat, who was private secretary (Note: The Dutch word geheimschrijver is a synonym of secretaris, which derives from the Latin secretarius, and is usually translated to the same word secretary in English, but it has the connotation of confidential secretary who also enciphers correspondence. The Dutch word would therefore be more appropriate for Abel's true function.) of Mary II of England, William III of England, and Anthonie Heinsius, and played a secret role as the chief of Heinsius' Cabinet noir and as a cryptographer of note.

== Life ==
=== Personal life ===
Abel was born as the son of Jeanne de Bommert Silvercroon, the daughter of a Swedish diplomat to the Dutch Republic, and presumably Dutch stadtholder Frederick Henry's son, William, who was married to Mary, Princess Royal and Princess of Orange at the time. He was never legitimized by William. (Note: As William was married at the time of conception this would not have been legally possible, as the biological father could under Dutch law only legitimize an "adulterous child" after his marriage had been dissolved. But William died in 1650, still married to Princess Mary. As a matter of fact his legitimate child William III, was posthumous, so had to have been conceived shortly before his death. All of this should be placed in context, however: William was only fifteen, and Mary only nine, when they were married in 1641. In 1646 William was only twenty, and Mary still only fifteen. If father William II had been unmarried there would have been less of a problem, as there was ample precedent in the family of the Princes of Orange for illegitimate children to be part of the father's household. E.g. Justinus van Nassau, William of Nassau (1601–1627), and Louis of Nassau, Lord of De Lek and Beverweerd, who in turn was the father of Henry de Nassau, Lord Overkirk (an important general in the service of William III).) His mother later married a Walloon officer in the service of the Dutch Republic by the name of Charles Tassin d'Alonne, and Abel took his name. (Note: According to the editor of Huygens, the stepfather, who died in a duel around 1656, never legitimized the child either, but after his death his brother, who was an attorney in Paris, adopted Abel, and gave him his name.) But as an illegitimate son of Prince William he was a half-brother of the later stadtholder William III, who would become king of England in 1689. Abel would remain unmarried and childless. He would later be granted Pickering Castle and other lands by his half-brother William III on 18 May 1697.

=== Career ===
After Prince William III married Princess Mary, the daughter of James, Duke of York, the brother of king Charles II of England in 1677, d'Alonne became her private secretary. He remained at her side until her death in 1694. When king William's own private secretary Constantijn Huygens Jr. died in 1697, d'Alonne was appointed in his stead. When William in his turn died in 1702, d'Alonne became the private secretary of the Grand pensionary Anthonie Heinsius of the Dutch Republic. As such he also became involved in the latter's secret diplomacy (as he had been in William's service) and he took over Heinsius' Cabinet noir, the center of Dutch espionage during the War of the Spanish Succession.

But he long before embarked on a secret career as a spymaster. As secretary of Princess Mary he intercepted a letter of Mary's chaplain, John Covel, proving his intent to abduct the princess, and bring her back to her father. (Note: He also appears to have been aware at an early stage of William's connections with Eizabeth de Villiers, who became his mistress.) After the Glorious Revolution he became even more involved in espionage, especially on the Jacobite Court in France. Probably to enable him to intercept correspondence, he was nominated to become head of the general post office in London, though that position went to another. But in 1690 he was involved in the interception of mail between France and the Jacobite army in Ireland. As secretary to Queen Mary he was privy to many secrets at the Court of St. James's as witnessed by a bundle of correspondence between an anonymous writer at the court (very Probably d'Alonne) with Everhard van Weede Dijkvelt, a confidant of William, who at the time was at The Hague, giving intimate details of events at court in the early 1690s.

He was also employed as a cryptographer. The first suspected instance was when the French ambassador to the Dutch Republic the Comte d'Avaux got himself involved in a scandal in 1684, when he wrote an indiscreet letter to pro-French regenten in Amsterdam. The letter was intercepted, and though it was encrypted, successfully decrypted, possibly by d'Alonne. There is more certainty that he was the cryptographer who decrypted intercepted correspondence between the French envoys to Bavaria and Sweden, Rouillé and Bonnac in 1707. The correspondence was intercepted in Brussels and apparently given to both Dutch and British cryptographers. These each decrypted the correspondence independently, but developed different decryptions, which proves that the Dutch version was not simply a copy of the British version.

De Leeuw tells us that in the Dutch archives the existence of a Black Chamber or Cabinet noir can only be inferred from the personal archives of Heinsius, and from a number of cryptographic worksheets in the handwriting of d'Alonne, that were accidentally stored with the archives of the Dutch legation at the Sublime Porte. De Leeuw explains that for decryption purposes the Dutch government usually relied upon the British, or on the Hanoverian Cabinet noir, during the War of the Spanish Succession, at least until the relations with Great Britain became strained with the ascent of the Tory Cabinet under Harley and Bolingbroke in 1710. The use of the Hanoverian cryptographers was definitely ended in 1711, because the Secreete Besogne (Secret Committee) of the States General of the Netherlands that handled foreign affairs for the Dutch Republic, had been indiscreet with material that had been handled by the Hanoverians, and the Hanoverians therefore lost trust. De Leeuw therefore surmises that d'Alonne was only used to decrypt intercepts when the Hanoverians could not be asked. This would only concern intercepts that would have been provided by the Brussels Post Office, (Note: The Anglo-Dutch co-dominion in the Spanish Netherlands after 1706 had installed François Jaupain as Director-general of the postal service in the Southern Netherlands as successor of the Frenchman Pajot. He used this position to intercept correspondence of interest to the two allies on a grand scale.)"under the nose and without the consent of the British." As d'Alonne worked very closely with Heinsius (they even shared the same office) the decryption did not even need to leave the premises, so secrecy could be assured. (Note: In any case d'Alonne was not the only Dutch codebreaker working during this period. De Leeuw also mentions the scientist Willem 's Gravesande and the British cryptographers William Blencowe and John Keill.)

== Sources ==
- Leeuw, K. de (1999). "The Black Chamber in the Dutch Republic during the War of the Spanish Succession and it Aftermath, 1707-1715" (PDF). The Historical Journal. 42 (1): 133–156. doi:10.1017/S0018246X98008292. S2CID 162387765.
- Leeuw, K. de (2000). "The use of codes and ciphers in the Dutch Republic, mainly during the 18th century". Cryptology and statecraft in the Dutch Republic (PDF). Amsterdam. pp. 6–51.
- Thompson, E.M. (1879). "Seventh report of the Royal Commission on Historical Manuscripts". The Academy and Literature. Vol. 16. Academy Publishing Company. pp. 168–169.
