= William Blencowe =

English cryptographer

- Born: 6 January 1683; Marston St. Lawrence, Northamptonshire, England
- Died: 25 August 1712 (aged 29); Northampton
- Education: University of Oxford
- Known for: Cryptography
- Parent(s): Sir John Blencowe; Anne Blencowe

William Blencowe (Marston St. Lawrence, 6 January 1683 – Northampton, 25 August 1712) was a British scholar and cryptographer who was the first official Royal Encipherer appointed by Anne, Queen of Great Britain. He worked for the English and other Allied governments during the War of the Spanish Succession.

== Early life ==
Blencowe, was the third son of Sir John Blencowe (1642–1726), a judge and baron of the Exchequer, and his wife, Anne Blencowe (1656–1718), the eldest daughter of the mathematician and cryptographer John Wallis. He matriculated at Lincoln College, Oxford in 1697 and moved later that year to Magdalen College, where he graduated BA in 1701.

== Career ==
Nominated by Archbishop Thomas Tenison, he became a fellow of All Souls College, Oxford on 21 December 1702, and he received his MA in 1704. He was taught cryptography by John Wallis, who was unofficial cryptographer to king William III of England. On the recommendation of his grandfather he received the survivorship of Wallis's pension of £100 per annum, following the latter's death on 28 October 1703. Blencowe succeeded Wallis as decipherer to the government. His eventual salary for the office was £200 per annum.

As a cryptographer Blencowe's work was initially made difficult for lack of intercepts to work on, though he had the occasional success, like the decryption of attack plans of Michel Chamillart, the French minister for war, that had fallen into the hands of the Duke of Marlborough. After the Brussels post office was taken over by François Jaupain (Note: Who happened to be a secret agent for the Dutch.) in 1707, there came many more intercepts available which Blencowe successfully deciphered. The results were often not shared with the Dutch. An example is the correspondence of the representative of the duke of Holstein-Gottorp in The Hague, Hermann von Petkum, that disclosed secrets about the negotiations between the Marquis de Torcy and the Grand pensionary of the Dutch Republic Anthonie Heinsius in 1709. As a consequence the British managed to bring about the failure of these negotiations

In 1707 the correspondence of the French emissary at the court of the Elector of Bavaria and his colleague in Sweden was intercepted and both Blencowe and Abel Tassin d'Alonne, the Dutch cryptographer, separately tried their hands at it (unbeknownst to each other, of course), and came to subtly different results, though they both successfully decrypted the letters.

In 1712 the correspondence between the secretary of the Bavarian Elector, Malknecht, and a secret agent in the Dutch Republic, masquerading as a merchant, David van Putten, (Note: The name may have been a pseudonym for Johann Konrad Norff, the emissary of the Prince-Bishop of Liège in The Hague.) was intercepted. In this time the negotiations which would eventually lead to the Peace of Utrecht were ongoing. The Dutch were trying to convince the Elector of Bavaria, who was the former Governor-General for the French side to take over the part of the Southern Netherlands still in French hands, and hand it over to the Dutch. The British and Austrians were none too pleased about this stratagem, so very interested in this correspondence. The correspondence was intercepted by Jaupain in Brussels and copied to both d'Alonne and Blencowe, who both decrypted it successfully (though the solution by d'Alonne was slightly better according to De Leeuw).

In 1709 Blencowe sought a dispensation to permit him to retain his fellowship at All Souls without his taking holy orders. This request was resisted by the warden, Bernard Gardiner, who tried to force Blencowe and Matthew Tindal, another college fellow, to take orders or resign. After Queen Anne had intervened on Blencowe's behalf, the dispute led to the abolition of the warden's veto on dispensations.

In 1711 Blencowe fell ill with a violent fever. He was recovering, but on 25 August 1712, he took his own life during temporary insanity caused by a relapse. He was buried in All Saints' Church, Northampton. His epitaph states that he was a "man studious of many kinds of learning, particularly of the common law, which he professed and practised with reputation; and of the art of deciphering letters wherein he excelled, and served the public for ten years".

After his death, Blencowe was succeeded by John Keill as Queen Anne's official decipherer.

== Sources ==
- Cave, E., ed. (1788). "Original Letter of dr. Wallis of March 17, 1702 concerning his grandson William Blencowe". The Gentleman's Magazine. 63 (May 1788): 380.
- Cave, E., ed. (1788). "Original Letter of dr. Wallis with Some Particulars of his Pension". The Gentleman's Magazine. 63 (June 1788): 479–480.
- Henderson, T.F.; Carther, Ph. (2004). "Blencowe, William (1683-1712)". Oxford Dictionary of National Biography. Oxford Dictionary of National Biography (online ed.). Oxford University Press. doi:10.1093/ref:odnb/2635. (Subscription, Wikipedia Library access or UK public library membership required.)
- Kahn, D. (1996). The Comprehensive History of Secret Communication from Ancient Times to the Internet. Simon and Schuster. ISBN 9781439103555.
- Leeuw, K. de (1999). "The Black Chamber in the Dutch Republic during the War of the Spanish Succession and it Aftermath, 1707-1715" (PDF). The Historical Journal. 42 (1): 133–156. doi:10.1017/S0018246X98008292. S2CID 162387765.
- Leeuw, K. de (2000). "The use of codes and ciphers in the Dutch Republic, mainly during the 18th century". Cryptology and statecraft in the Dutch Republic (PDF). Amsterdam. pp. 6–51.
