= Anne Blencowe =

British compiler of recipes

Anne, Lady Blencowe
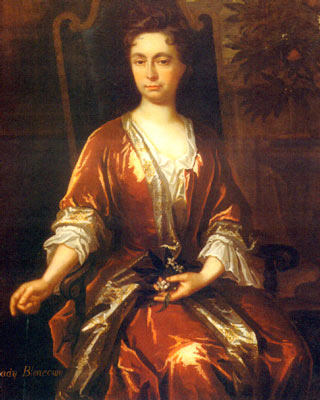
- Born: Anne Wallis; 4 June 1656
- Died: 6 April 1718 (aged 61); Marston St. Lawrence, Northamptonshire, England
- Known for: Compiling recipes
- Spouse: Sir John Blencowe
- Children: 7
- Parent: John Wallis

Anne Blencowe (née Wallis; 4 June 1656 – 6 April 1718), also known as Lady Blencowe, was a British compiler of recipes. Her book was first published more than 200 years after her death.

== Life ==
Anne Wallis was born to Susanna (Glynde) and Professor John Wallis, who taught geometry at Oxford University and was employed as a cryptographer. Anne Wallis is thought to have had a good education. In 1675, she married a barrister, Sir John Blencowe, who had recently inherited Marston Hall and his family's estate at Marston St. Lawrence in Northamptonshire. She became Anne, Lady Blencowe. The couple had seven children and five survived to be adults.

Blencowe took a great interest in the food of her household. She understood about using sugar and vinegar to preserve food and she made her own country wines. She knew how to boil down meat to make a gluey substance that could be used as an early form of stock cube. She gathered these techniques together in a book of sweet and savoury dishes that included a separate section for medicines. Blencowe shared her recipes and also adopted the village's own recipe for buns. Her book was published in 1925 and gives an insight into the lives of the upper-class English. The Blencoes had access to morels, truffles, peaches, apricots, barberries and spices.

Blencowe's son William Blencowe had been taught by her father, and he in time took on her father's role as the government's decoder of intercepted messages. William took his own life in 1712.

Blencoe died in 1718 and her husband died eight years later. They were both buried in Marston St. Lawrence.

== Legacy ==
Her recipes ("receipts" in the older spelling) were kept in the library of her daughter, Susanna Jennens, at Weston Hall. This house was passed through the female line until it came into the possession of Sacheverell Sitwell, whose wife Georgia discovered the book. She showed it to George Saintsbury, who arranged for it to be published. More than 200 years after Blencowe's death, her recipe book was published, in 1925, accompanied by an eight-page introduction by Saintsbury. 600 copies were printed. A new edition was produced in 2004 by Christina Stapley with an introduction by one of Blencowe's descendants.

A painting of her, thought to date from 1675, is extant and is attributed to a painter from the school of Michael Dahl.
