= François Jaupain =

Postmaster and spy (1678–1726)

- Born: 1678
- Died: 10 June 1726 (aged 47–48); Brussels Austrian Netherlands
- Occupation: Director-general of the postal system in the Southern Netherlands (1706 - 1725)
- Known for: Spying on the mail in his remit
- Spouse: Jeanne Catherine de Bock
- Children: 3

François Jaupain (1678? - Brussels, 10 June 1726) was the Director-general of the postal system in the Southern Netherlands between 1706 and 1725, which position he used to sell information to the Allied side in the War of the Spanish Succession and to act as a spymaster in the service of the Governor-General of the Austrian Netherlands Prince Eugene of Savoy.

== Career ==
=== Official career ===
Jaupain appears to have been the Valet de chambre of the exiled Jansenist canon Ernest Ruth d’Ans. His aunts Anne and Adrienne were also members of the Ruth d'Ans household. This suggests that Jaupain could make use of the network of Jansenist exiles in the Spanish Netherlands around 1700. This may have introduced him to the postmaster of Brussels around 1700, a certain Chaumont, who also circulated in these circles. Chaumont was an employee of the Thurn und Taxis family that from 1615 had the monoploy of the Kaiserliche Reichspost, the postal service of the Holy Roman Empire, but also of the Habsburg Netherlands. When in 1700 Philip V of Spain became the new sovereign of the Spanish Netherlands he reformed the postal system on the French model and appointed Leon Pajot as the Director-general of the Postal System in the Southern Netherlands. (Note: This meant that the mail was organized along the lines of the admodial system: it still was a monopoly that was given to an entrepreneur who paid a fixed sum to be allowed to operate it.) In this period Jaupain climbed up to the position of his assistant. Meanwhile, the War of the Spanish Succession had broken out and the Southern Netherlands had become one of its main theatres. Jaupain chose the side of the Anglo-Dutch allies that had invaded the country. When the allies conquered most of the country in 1706 after the Battle of Ramillies, they appointed Jaupain Director-general of the postal system as successor of Pajot on 20 July 1706. (Note: Jaupain had since 1704 sold correspondence he intercepted to the Allies. This probably explains why they elevated him so sudden to this position.) In 1707-8 he joined as a lieutenant-colonel the staff of the regiment of colonel Hartopp in the army of the duke of Marlborough, probably in charge of intelligence.

After the Peace of Rastatt the former Spanish Netherlands became the Austrian Netherlands with Prince Eugene of Savoy as Governor-General. He continued Jaupain in his office of Director-General. (Note: This was only formalized on 4 February 1716 when the Austrian Netherlands were formally transferred to Austrian sovereignty. This uncertainty weakened Jaupain's negotiation position in his conflicts with the Amsterdam postmasters about long-running contracts he had concluded with them about the transport of letters to and from Spain.) The Austrian Emperor Charles VI even ennobled Jaupain in 1712. He remained in this post until on 16 June 1725 the Thurn und Taxis firm was restored in its monopoly of the mail in the Austrian Netherlands, and the son of the postmaster that he had replaced in 1706 was appointed as his successor. Prince Eugene then appointed him as a member of the Cour de Comptes of Flanders.

=== Secret career ===
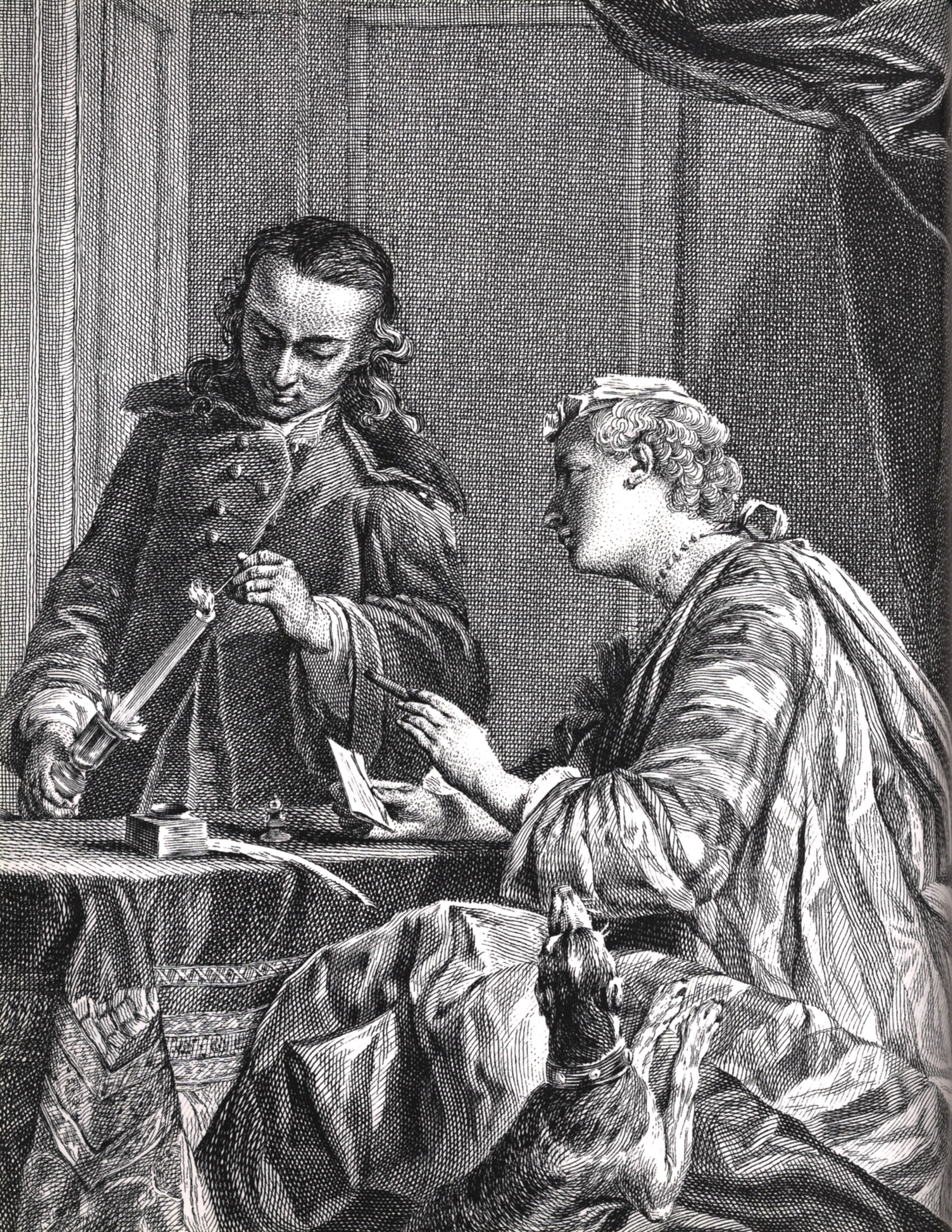
A woman sealing a letter by Étienne Fessard

Jaupain approached the Dutch fieldmarshal Henry de Nassau, Lord Overkirk in 1704 with an offer to procure the correspondence of the secretary of the then Governor-General of the Spanish Netherlands Maximilian II Emanuel, Elector of Bavaria. He followed up by approaching Marlborough and the English Secretary of State Sunderland in 1706. This began a long career as the head of what could be called the Anglo-Dutch black chamber in Brussels, which intercepted the correspondence of people of interest to these allies, secretly copied it, and forwarded the often encrypted copies to William Blencowe (the British cryptographer) and Abel Tassin d'Alonne (his Dutch equivalent) for deciphering, often without these clients being aware that he served them both with the same "product".

Jaupain went to great lengths to prevent discovery of the fact that he had opened, and copied, letters in his postoffices. In his day letters were usually sealed with a stamped wax seal to ensure that they had not been opened by unauthorized people; if the seal had been broken that indicated that the correspondence was compromised. Jaupain therefore developed a special technique to prevent discovery. He first removed the seal by heating the wax at the edges (which would discolor the paper, but only people aware of the process would think this suspicious). Then he made an imprint of the seal with a paste of liquid silver which allowed him to forge the seal in future; the forged seal was only slightly more vague than the original. Of course, the senders were aware of the risk of interception. For that reason such confidential correspondence was usually enciphered. (Note: The French, with some justification, were very confident of the strength of their codes, which were sophisticated for the time. They utulized a polyalphabetic cipher that used different methods of enciphering and deciphering. Because of that confidence they continued sending their diplomatic mail through enemy territory.) Jaupain did not attempt to decipher the letters he opened himself, but copied the ciphertext exactly and forwarded the copies to the cryptographers in London and The Hague.

But Jaupain not only opened the correspondence that passed his own office in Brussels (or the 31 other post offices that came under his remit). He had made a deal with his old boss Pajot, who was still chief of the postal system in the part of the Southern Netherlands that was still under French control, to supply him with intercepted correspondence from that part of the country. In sum he sat astride the French diplomatic post to the entire northwest of Europe.

After the peace Jaupain continued his interceptions of the mail, but now also in the service of the Austrian authorities, even though he also on occasion spied on Dominik von Königsegg-Rothenfels, who acted as the governor of the Austrian Netherlands in Prince Eugene's absence. But he also acted as a spymaster for Prince Eugene. In that capacity he tried to recruit de French spy Lenglet, who, however turned out to be a double agent. In this period the British were still very interested in the Jacobite court in exile in France and Jaupain continued to be of value to them.

== Personal life ==
Jaupain married Jeanne Catherine de Bock. They had the following children: Jeanne Calherine Adrienne, Marie Florence, and François-Joseph. Jaupain bought the lordship of Machelen around 1717 and the chateau located there, after he had been ennobled by the Austrian Emperor Charles VI in 1712.

== Death ==
Jaupain died on 10 June 1726 in Brussels.

== Sources ==
- Pohlig, M. (2021). ""Le maître de cette poste est notre plus grand enemi." Postal service and Espionage during the War of the Spanish Succession". In Braun, G.; Lachenicht, S. (eds.). Spies, Espionage and Secret Diplomacy in the Early Modern Period. Kohlhammer Verlag. pp. 105–121.
- Bruneel, C.; Hoyois, J.P. (2001). "Jaupain". Les grands commis du gouvernement des Pays-Bas autrichiens: dictionnaire biographique du personnel des institutions centrales (in French). Archives générales du royaume.
- Gelder, K. van (2015). "Dépasser l'éloignement : les correspondances d'Eugène de Savoie et le gouvernement à distance des Pays-Bas autrichiens (1716-1725)". Revue du Nord (in French). 411 (3): 527–550.
- Hanot, N. (2018). "Les postes disparues de Bruxelles". Musee-gourmandise (in French). Archived from the original on 4 February 2022.
- Leeuw, K. de (1999). "The Black Chamber in the Dutch Republic during the War of the Spanish Succession and it Aftermath, 1707-1715" (PDF). The Historical Journal. 42 (1): 133–156.
- Overvoorde, J.C. (1902). Geschiedenis van het postwezen in Nederland vóór 1795: met de voornaamste verbindingen met het buitenland (in Dutch). Sijthoff.
- Sheridan, G.F. (1980). The life and works of Nicolas Lenglet-Dufresnoy1674-1755 (PDF).
- Wauters, A.J. (1855). Histoire des environs de Bruxelles ou Description historique des localités que formaient autrefois l'ammannie de cette ville. Ouvrage faisant suite à l'Histoire de Bruxelles (in French).
