= Sir John Blencowe =

English judge and politician

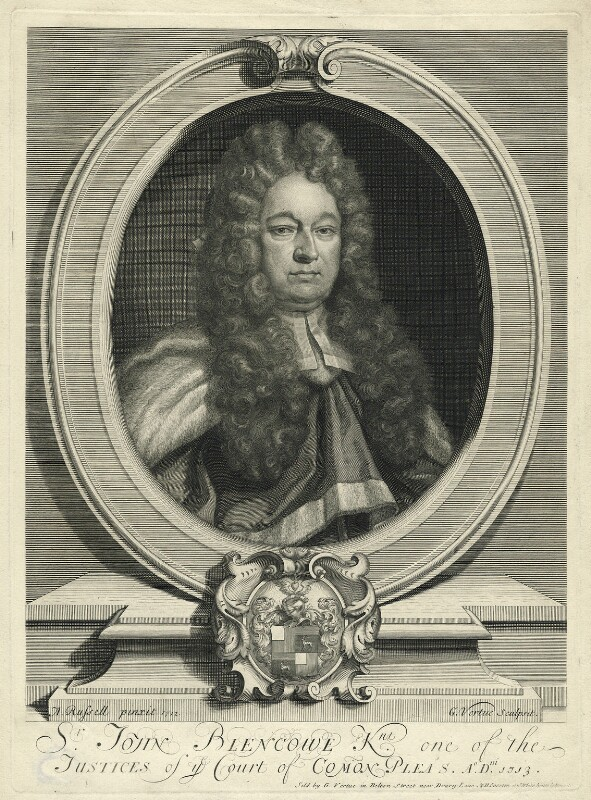
- Born: 1642; Marston St. Lawrence
- Died: May 1726 (aged 83–84)
- Occupations: Judge and politician

Sir John Blencowe (1642 – May 1726) was an English judge and politician.

== Biography ==
Blencowe was born in 1642 at the manor of Marston St. Lawrence, on the Oxfordshire border of Northamptonshire. The family came originally from Greystock, in Cumberland, but this estate was granted to one Thomas Blencowe in the time of Henry VI. Fifth in descent from him was Thomas, father of John Blencowe, who married as his second wife Anne, daughter of the Rev. Dr. Francis Savage of Ripple in Worcestershire. John was educated at Oriel College, Oxford, with which his family was connected. A Blencowe was an early benefactor of the college, and Anthony Blencowe, D.C.L., was provost from 1572 to 1617. He was entered a student of the Inner Temple in 1663, called to the bar 1673, elected a master of the bench in 1687, received the degree of serjeant-at-law 11 April 1689, and represented Brackley in Northamptonshire for five years in the parliament of 1690, being a firm adherent of the government. He married Anne, eldest daughter of Dr. John Wallis, Savilian professor of geometry in Oxford. To this marriage Blencowe in part owed his advancement; for when the deanery (or bishopric, according to Granger) of Hereford was offered to Dr. Wallis he declined it, and asked a favour for his son-in-law, saying, 'I have a son-in-law, Mr. Serjeant Blencowe, of the Inner Temple, a member of parliament, an able lawyer, and not inferior to many of those on the bench, of a good life and great integrity, cordial to the government, and serviceable to it.' Accordingly, on 17 September 1696, Blencowe was raised to the bench as a baron of the exchequer, in the room of Sir John Turton. He was removed to the king's bench on 18 January 1697, and knighted and transferred to the common pleas 20 November 1714. Although Baker, Noble, and others speak of him as in the queen's bench from 1702 to 1714, and Luttrell (v. 183) says it was intended to remove him at the beginning of Queen Anne's reign, still Lord Raymond's law reports never speak of him as sitting in the queen's bench, but speak of him as in the common pleas, both at Anne's accession and George I's (Ld. Raymond, 769, 1317). He may then have passed directly from the exchequer to the common pleas. In 1718 he is concurring with other judges in favour of the king's prerogative to control the marriage and education of the royal family. He retired on a pension on 22 June 1722 at the age of eighty, and died May 1726, and was buried at Brackley. Before his death his faculties had decayed; he conceived he had discovered the longitude, and employed his son William in copying his writings to lay before parliament. He is described as being an honest, blunt, and kindly man, but of no great qualifications. He had a large family: John, his heir; Thomas, afterwards a bencher of the Inner Temple, from whom springs the family of Blencowe of Bincham, near Lewes: William; Mary, who married Alexander Prescott, of Tlioby Priory, in Essex; Anne, who married in 1720 Sir E. Probyn, of Newlands, chief baron of the exchequer; Elizabeth; and Susannah, who married R. Jennens, of Princethorp. His third son William, born Jan. 1682–3, was the decipherer.
