= Linear continuum =

In mathematics, a generalization of the real line

In the mathematical field of order theory, a continuum or linear continuum is a generalization of the real line.

Formally, a linear continuum is a linearly ordered set S of more than one element that is densely ordered, i.e., between any two distinct elements there is another (and hence infinitely many others), and conditionally complete, i.e., which "lacks gaps" in the sense that every nonempty subset with an upper bound has a least upper bound in the set. More symbolically:

1. S has the least upper bound property, and
2. For each x in S and each y in S with x < y, there exists z in S such that x < z < y

A set has the least upper bound property, if every nonempty subset of the set that is bounded above has a least upper bound in the set. Linear continua are particularly important in the field of topology where they can be used to verify whether an ordered set given the order topology is connected or not.

Unlike the standard real line, a linear continuum may be bounded on either side: for example, any (real) closed interval is a linear continuum.

== Examples ==
- The ordered set of real numbers, R, with its usual order is a linear continuum, and is the archetypal example. Property b) is trivial, and property a) is simply a reformulation of the completeness axiom.

Examples in addition to the real numbers:

- sets which are order-isomorphic to the set of real numbers, for example a real open interval, and the same with half-open gaps (note that these are not gaps in the above-mentioned sense)
- the affinely extended real number system and order-isomorphic sets, for example the unit interval
- the set of real numbers with only +∞ or only −∞ added, and order-isomorphic sets, for example a half-open interval
- the long line
- The set I × I (where × denotes the Cartesian product and I = [0, 1]) in the lexicographic order is a linear continuum. Property b) is trivial. To check property a), we define a map, π_{1} : I × I → I by

π_{1} (x, y) = x

This map is known as the projection map. The projection map is continuous (with respect to the product topology on I × I) and is surjective. Let A be a nonempty subset of I × I which is bounded above. Consider π_{1}(A). Since A is bounded above, π_{1}(A) must also be bounded above. Since, π_{1}(A) is a subset of I, it must have a least upper bound (since I has the least upper bound property). Therefore, we may let b be the least upper bound of π_{1}(A). If b belongs to π_{1}(A), then b × I will intersect A at say b × c for some c ∈ I. Notice that since b × I has the same order type of I, the set (b × I) ∩ A will indeed have a least upper bound b × c', which is the desired least upper bound for A.

If b does not belong to π_{1}(A), then b × 0 is the least upper bound of A, for if d < b, and d × e is an upper bound of A, then d would be a smaller upper bound of π_{1}(A) than b, contradicting the unique property of b.

== Non-examples ==
- The ordered set Q of rational numbers is not a linear continuum. Even though property b) is satisfied, property a) is not. Consider the subset

A = {x ∈ Q | x < √2}

of the set of rational numbers. Even though this set is bounded above by any rational number greater than √2 (for instance 3), it has no least upper bound in the rational numbers. (Specifically, for any rational upper bound r > √2, r/2 + 1/r is a closer rational upper bound; details at Methods of computing square roots § Heron's method.)

- The ordered set of non-negative integers with its usual order is not a linear continuum. Property a) is satisfied (let A be a subset of the set of non-negative integers that is bounded above. Then A is finite so it has a maximum, and this maximum is the desired least upper bound of A). On the other hand, property b) is not. Indeed, 5 is a non-negative integer and so is 6, but there exists no non-negative integer that lies strictly between them.
- The ordered set A of nonzero real numbers

A = (−∞, 0) ∪ (0, +∞)

is not a linear continuum. Property b) is trivially satisfied. However, if B is the set of negative real numbers:

B = (−∞, 0)

then B is a subset of A which is bounded above (by any element of A greater than 0; for instance 1), but has no least upper bound in A. Notice that 0 is not a bound for B since 0 is not an element of A.

- Let Z_{−} denote the set of negative integers and let A = (0, 5) ∪ (5, +∞). Let

S = Z_{−} ∪ A.

Then S satisfies neither property a) nor property b). The proof is similar to the previous examples.

== Topological properties ==
Even though linear continua are important in the study of ordered sets, they do have applications in the mathematical field of topology. In fact, we will prove that an ordered set in the order topology is connected if and only if it is a linear continuum. We will prove one implication, and leave the other one as an exercise. (Munkres explains the second part of the proof in)

Theorem

Let X be an ordered set in the order topology. If X is connected, then X is a linear continuum.

Proof:

Suppose that x and y are elements of X with x < y. If there exists no z in X such that x < z < y, consider the sets:

A = (−∞, y)

B = (x, +∞)

These sets are disjoint (If a is in A, a < y so that if a is in B, a > x and a < y which is impossible by hypothesis), nonempty (x is in A and y is in B) and open (in the order topology), and their union is X. This contradicts the connectedness of X.

Now we prove the least upper bound property. If C is a subset of X that is bounded above and has no least upper bound, let D be the union of all open rays of the form (b, +∞) where b is an upper bound for C. Then D is open (since it is the union of open sets), and closed (if a is not in D, then a < b for all upper bounds b of C so that we may choose q > a such that q is in C (if no such q exists, a is the least upper bound of C), then an open interval containing a may be chosen that doesn't intersect D). Since D is nonempty (there is more than one upper bound of D for if there was exactly one upper bound s, s would be the least upper bound. Then if b_{1} and b_{2} are two upper bounds of D with b_{1} < b_{2}, b_{2} will belong to D), D and its complement together form a separation on X. This contradicts the connectedness of X.

=== Applications of the theorem ===
1. Since the ordered set A = (−∞, 0) U (0,+∞) is not a linear continuum, it is disconnected.
2. By applying the theorem just proved, the fact that R is connected follows. In fact any interval (or ray) in R is also connected.
3. The set of integers is not a linear continuum and therefore cannot be connected.
4. In fact, if an ordered set in the order topology is a linear continuum, it must be connected. Since any interval in this set is also a linear continuum, it follows that this space is locally connected since it has a basis consisting entirely of connected sets.
5. For an example of a topological space that is a linear continuum, see long line.

== See also ==
- Cantor-Dedekind axiom
- Order topology
- Least upper bound property
- Total order
