= Cantor–Dedekind axiom =

Equivalence between synthetic and analytic geometries

In mathematical logic, the Cantor–Dedekind axiom is the thesis that the real numbers are order-isomorphic to the linear continuum of geometry. In other words, the axiom states that there is a one-to-one correspondence between real numbers and points on a line.

This axiom became a theorem proved by Emil Artin in his book Geometric Algebra. More precisely, Euclidean spaces defined over the field of real numbers satisfy the axioms of Euclidean geometry, and, from the axioms of Euclidean geometry, one can construct a field that is isomorphic to the real numbers.

Analytic geometry was developed from the Cartesian coordinate system introduced by René Descartes. It implicitly assumed this axiom by blending the distinct concepts of real numbers and points on a line, sometimes referred to as the real number line. Artin's proof, not only makes this blend explicitly, but also that analytic geometry is strictly equivalent with the traditional synthetic geometry, in the sense that exactly the same theorems can be proved in the two frameworks.

Another consequence is that Alfred Tarski's proof of the decidability of first-order theories of the real numbers could be seen as an algorithm to solve any first-order problem in Euclidean geometry.

== See also ==
- Cantor's theorem
