= Imaginary line (mathematics) =

Straight line that only contains one real point

In complex geometry, an imaginary line is a straight line that only contains one real point. It can be proven that this point is the intersection point with the conjugated line.

It is a special case of an imaginary curve.

An imaginary line is found in the complex projective plane P^{2}(C) where points are represented by three homogeneous coordinates $(x_1,\ x_2,\ x_3),\quad x_i \isin C .$

Boyd Patterson described the lines in this plane:

The locus of points whose coordinates satisfy a homogeneous linear equation with complex coefficients

$$a_1\ x_1 +\  a_2\ x_2 \ + a_3\ x_3 \ =\  0$$

is a straight line and the line is real or imaginary according as the coefficients of its equation are or are not proportional to three real numbers.

Felix Klein described imaginary geometrical structures: "We will characterize a geometric structure as imaginary if its coordinates are not all real.:

According to Hatton:

The locus of the double points (imaginary) of the overlapping involutions in which an overlapping involution pencil (real) is cut by real transversals is a pair of imaginary straight lines.

Hatton continues,

Hence it follows that an imaginary straight line is determined by an imaginary point, which is a double point of an involution, and a real point, the vertex of the involution pencil.

== See also ==
- Conic section
- Imaginary number
- Imaginary point
- Real curve

== Citations ==
- J.L.S. Hatton (1920) The Theory of the Imaginary in Geometry together with the Trigonometry of the Imaginary, Cambridge University Press via Internet Archive
- Felix Klein (1928) Vorlesungen über nicht-euklischen Geometrie, Julius Springer.
