= Everhard van Weede Dijkvelt =

Dutch diplomat (1626–1702)

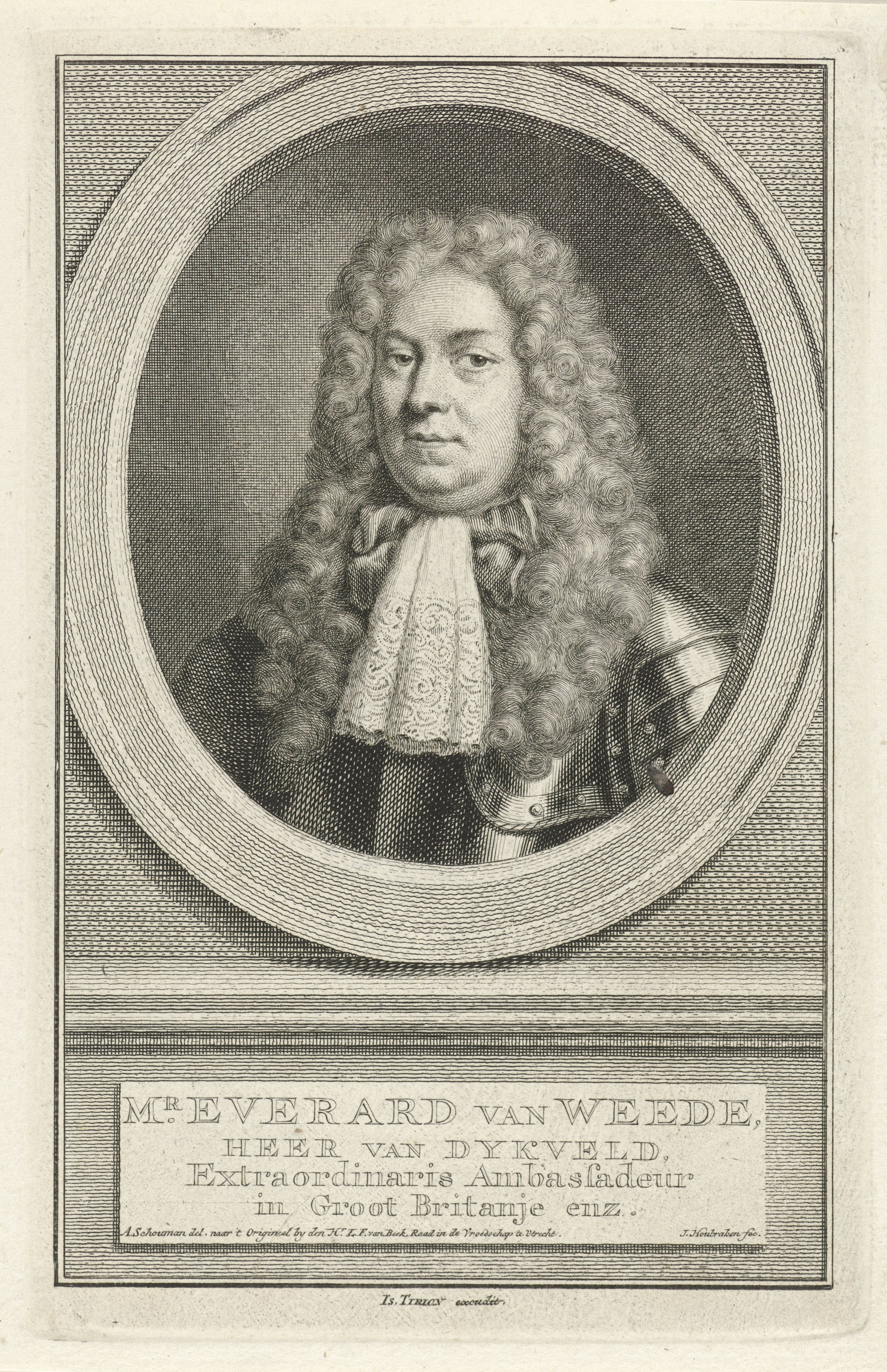

Everard van Weede van Dijkvelt (1626 – 6 June 1702) was a Dutch member of the Knighthood of Utrecht (city) and ambassador at the court of Charles II of England.

He was born in Utrecht, the son of Johan van Weede and Catharina de Cupere. In 1648, he accompanied Godard van Reede, heer van Nederhorst, to help with the treaty negotiations at Munster. In the rampjaar 1672, he was sent to London to try to convince the English to desist from their support of the French, in which effort he was unsuccessful. In 1678, he went to Brussels to negotiate a peace treaty that was finally ratified in France in 1684. As an emissary of William of Orange, he negotiated with James II on matters relating to the Protestant succession and Catholic emancipation. He died in London, and was buried in Utrecht on 2 August 1702.
