= Marston St. Lawrence =

Village in Northamptonshire, England

Coordinates: 52.079°N 1.218°W

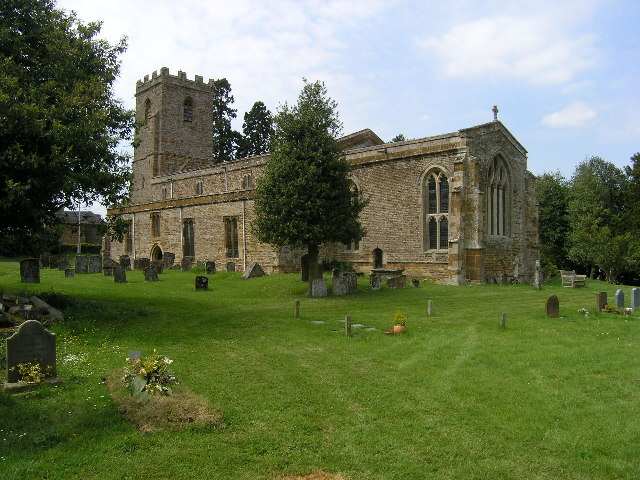
- St Lawrence's parish church

- Location within Northamptonshire
- Population: 202 (2011 Census)
- OS grid reference: SP5342
- Civil parish: Marston St. Lawrence
- Unitary authority: West Northamptonshire
- Ceremonial county: Northamptonshire
- Region: East Midlands
- Country: England
- Sovereign state: United Kingdom
- Post town: Banbury
- Postcode district: OX17
- Dialling code: 01295
- Police: Northamptonshire
- Fire: Northamptonshire
- Ambulance: East Midlands
- UK Parliament: South Northamptonshire

Marston St. Lawrence is a village and civil parish about 4 miles (6.4 km) northwest of Brackley in Northamptonshire. A stream flows through the village and another forms the southern boundary of the parish. The two merge as Farthinghoe Stream, a tributary of the Great Ouse. The 2001 Census recorded the parish population as 209, decreasing slightly to 202 at the 2011 Census.

The villages name means 'marsh farm/settlement'.

== Archaeology ==
A Palaeolithic hand axe has been found southwest of the village. Late Neolithic or Bronze Age finds in the parish include stone scrapers, 27 flint arrowheads, three stone axes and fragments of three polished hand-axes. A Bronze Age hoard of weapons was found in Thenford Hill Farm near the village in the nineteenth century that is now in the collections of the British Museum. Traces of an Iron Age and Roman-era settlement south of the village have been found. Artefacts recovered include fragments of possibly Iron Age pottery, Roman tiles and pottery, and five second- or third-century urns, including one containing bones. Traces of other Roman-era settlements have been found in other parts of the parish.

A Saxon cemetery 1 mile (1.6 km) north of the village was found in the 1840s. One skeleton was found in 1842, leading to an excavation in 1843 that found 32 skeletons of humans and one of a horse. There were also four urns, three of which contained cremations. Artefacts found include six pairs of saucer brooches, one large brooch and a bronze clasp. The cemetery has been tentatively dated to the sixth century AD.

== Parish church ==
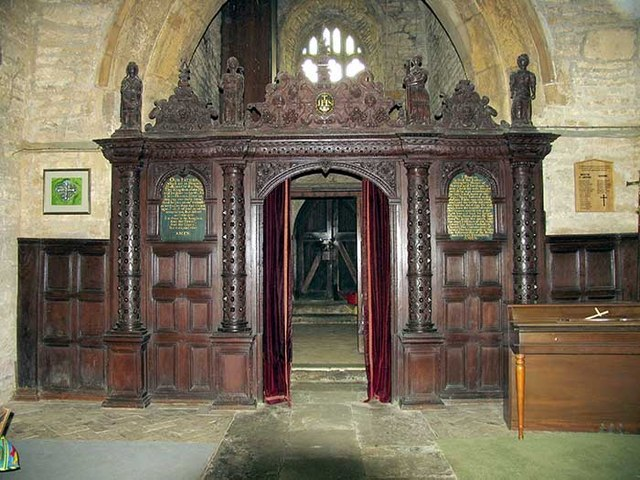
Jacobean screen to St Lawrence's tower, made about 1610

The Church of England parish church of St. Lawrence is a Grade I listed building. Much of the building is Decorated Gothic, including the chancel arch and the arcades to both the north and south aisles. The north arcade is of four bays and was built in the 13th century. The Perpendicular Gothic east window of the chancel was added in the second half of the 14th century. One of the aisles was also rebuilt in Perpendicular Gothic, and the bell tower was added late in the Perpendicular period (15th or early 16th century). There are two carved wooden screens: a Perpendicular one to the north chapel and a very well-carved Jacobean one of about 1610 to the tower.

The tower has a ring of five bells. William Rufford of Toddington, Bedfordshire cast the second and third bells in about 1399. Ellis I Knight of Reading, Berkshire cast the treble and fourth bells in 1627. Henry I Bagley of Chacombe cast the tenor bell in 1639.

The parish is a member of the Chenderit Benefice, which includes the parishes of Chacombe, Greatworth, Middleton Cheney, Thenford and Warkworth.

== Marston House ==
The origins of the house are either Elizabethan or Jacobean, and one wing includes a panelled room that includes a richly carved overmantel bearing the date 1611. But the house was completely rebuilt between 1700 and 1730, making the present building either Queen Anne or early Georgian. It is a Grade II* listed building.

== Notable people ==
Sir John Blencowe and his wife Anne Blencowe lived and were buried here. John was a barrister and Anne was noted for gathering recipes. The labouring-class poet Mary Leapor (1722–46) was born in Marston St Lawrence.

Marston St. Lawrence Cricket Club plays in the South Northants Cricket League.

== Sources ==
- Pevsner, Nikolaus; Cherry, Bridget (1973) [1961]. Northamptonshire. The Buildings of England. Harmondsworth: Penguin Books. pp. 302–303. ISBN 0-14-071022-1.
- RCHME, ed. (1982). An Inventory of the Historical Monuments in the County of Northamptonshire. Vol. 4, Archaeological Sites in South-West Northamptonshire. London: Her Majesty's Stationery Office. pp. 98–101.
