= Real point =

In geometry, a real point is a point in the complex projective plane with homogeneous coordinates (x,y,z) for which there exists a nonzero complex number λ such that λx, λy, and λz are all real numbers.

This definition can be widened to a complex projective space of arbitrary finite dimension as follows:

$$(u_1, u_2, \ldots, u_n)$$

are the homogeneous coordinates of a real point if there exists a nonzero complex number λ such that the coordinates of

$$(\lambda u_1, \lambda u_2, \ldots, \lambda u_n)$$

are all real.

A point which is not real is called an imaginary point.

== Context ==
Geometries that are specializations of real projective geometry, such as Euclidean geometry, elliptic geometry or conformal geometry may be complexified, thus embedding the points of the geometry in a complex projective space, but retaining the identity of the original real space as special. Lines, planes etc. are expanded to the lines, etc. of the complex projective space. As with the inclusion of points at infinity and complexification of real polynomials, this allows some theorems to be stated more simply without exceptions and for a more regular algebraic analysis of the geometry.

Viewed in terms of homogeneous coordinates, a real vector space of homogeneous coordinates of the original geometry is complexified. A point of the original geometric space is defined by an equivalence class of homogeneous vectors of the form λu, where λ is an nonzero complex value and u is a real vector. A point of this form (and hence belongs to the original real space) is called a real point, whereas a point that has been added through the complexification and thus does not have this form is called an imaginary point.

== Real subspace ==
A subspace of a projective space is real if it is spanned by real points. Every imaginary point belongs to exactly one real line, the line through the point and its complex conjugate.

== See also ==
- Rational point
