= Mary, Princess Royal and Princess of Orange =

Princess of Orange from 1647 to 1650

Mary
- Princess Royal
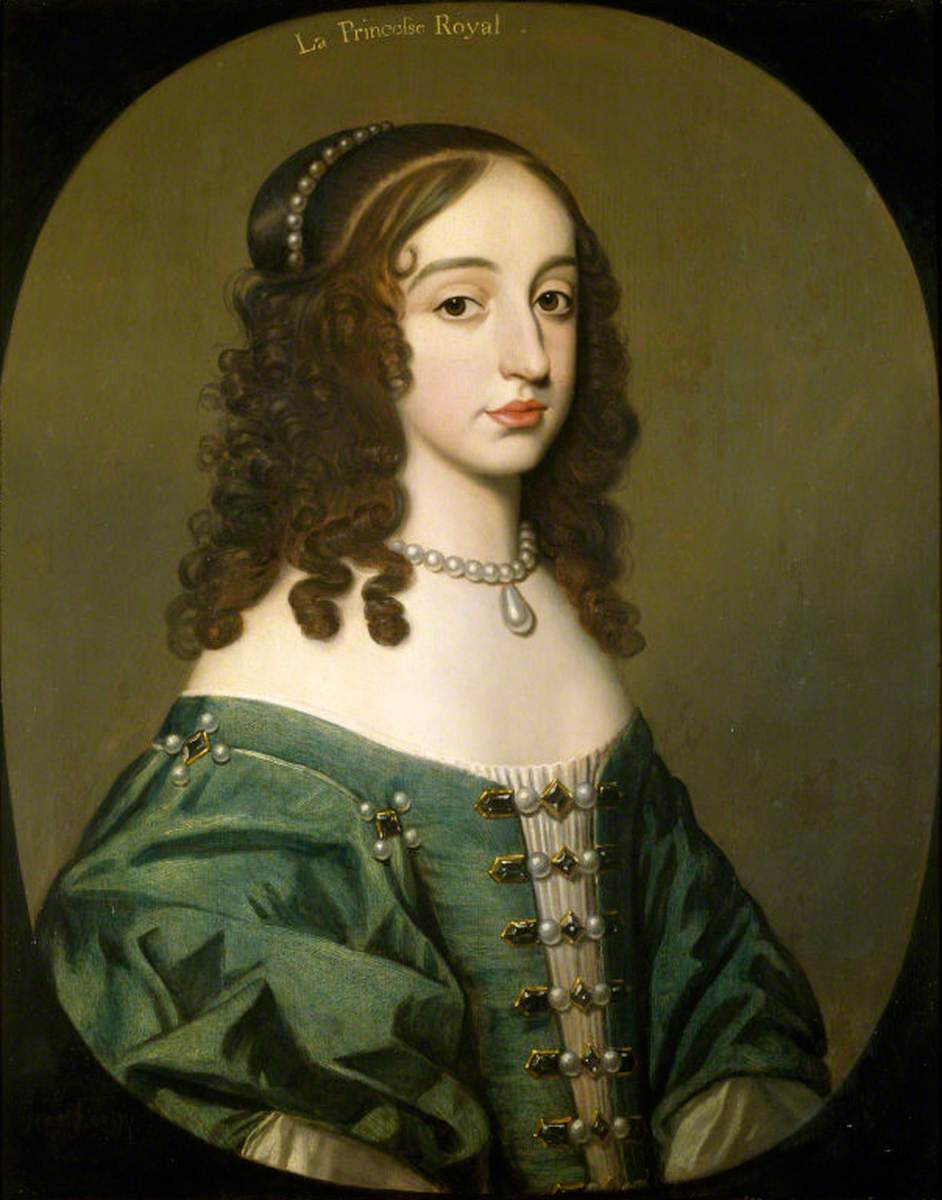
- Portrait by Gerard van Honthorst, c. 1647

Princess consort of Orange; Countess consort of Nassau
- Tenure: 14 March 1647 – 6 November 1650
- Born: 4 November 1631; St James's Palace, Westminster, England
- Died: 24 December 1660 (aged 29); Whitehall Palace, Westminster, England
- Burial: 29 December 1660; Westminster Abbey
- Spouse: William II, Prince of Orange (m. 1641; died 1650)
- Issue: William III of England
Names
- Mary Henrietta Stuart
- House: Stuart
- Father: Charles I of England
- Mother: Henrietta Maria of France

Mary, Princess Royal (Mary Henrietta Stuart; 4 November 1631 – 24 December 1660), was a British princess, a member of the House of Stuart, and by marriage Princess of Orange and Countess of Nassau. She acted as regent for her minor son from 1651 to 1660. She was the first holder of the title Princess Royal.

Mary was the eldest daughter of King Charles I of England and Queen Henrietta Maria, and sister of Charles II and James II. She was married to the future stadtholder of the Netherlands, William II of Orange, in 1641 at the age of nine, while he was fourteen. Initially, she remained in England with her parents because of the heated political situation in England until early 1642, when she and her mother left for the Netherlands. Five years later in 1647, Mary's husband inherited the titles of Prince of Orange and Stadtholder of Holland, Zeeland, Utrecht, Guelders, Overijssel and Groningen in the United Provinces of the Netherlands.

Eight days after her husband's death in 1650, Mary gave birth to a son, William III of Orange, who later became king of England, Scotland and Ireland. Mary, who became the only guardian of her son, was not popular in the Netherlands because of her support of her brothers and her difficult relationship with her mother-in-law Amalia of Solms-Braunfels, who considered the princess young and inexperienced. After the restoration of the monarchy in England in 1660, Mary departed for celebrations in London, where she fell ill with smallpox and died.

== Early years ==
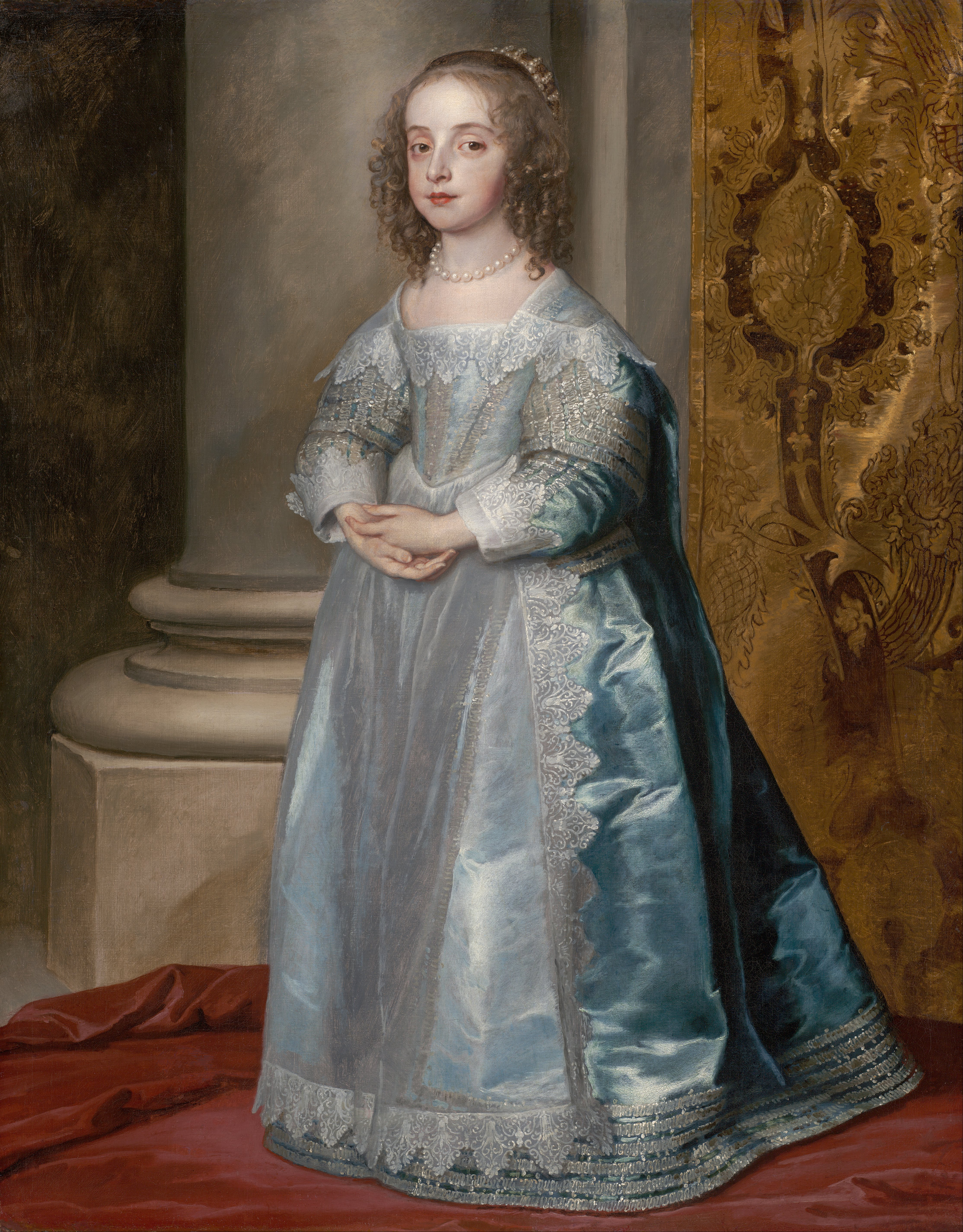
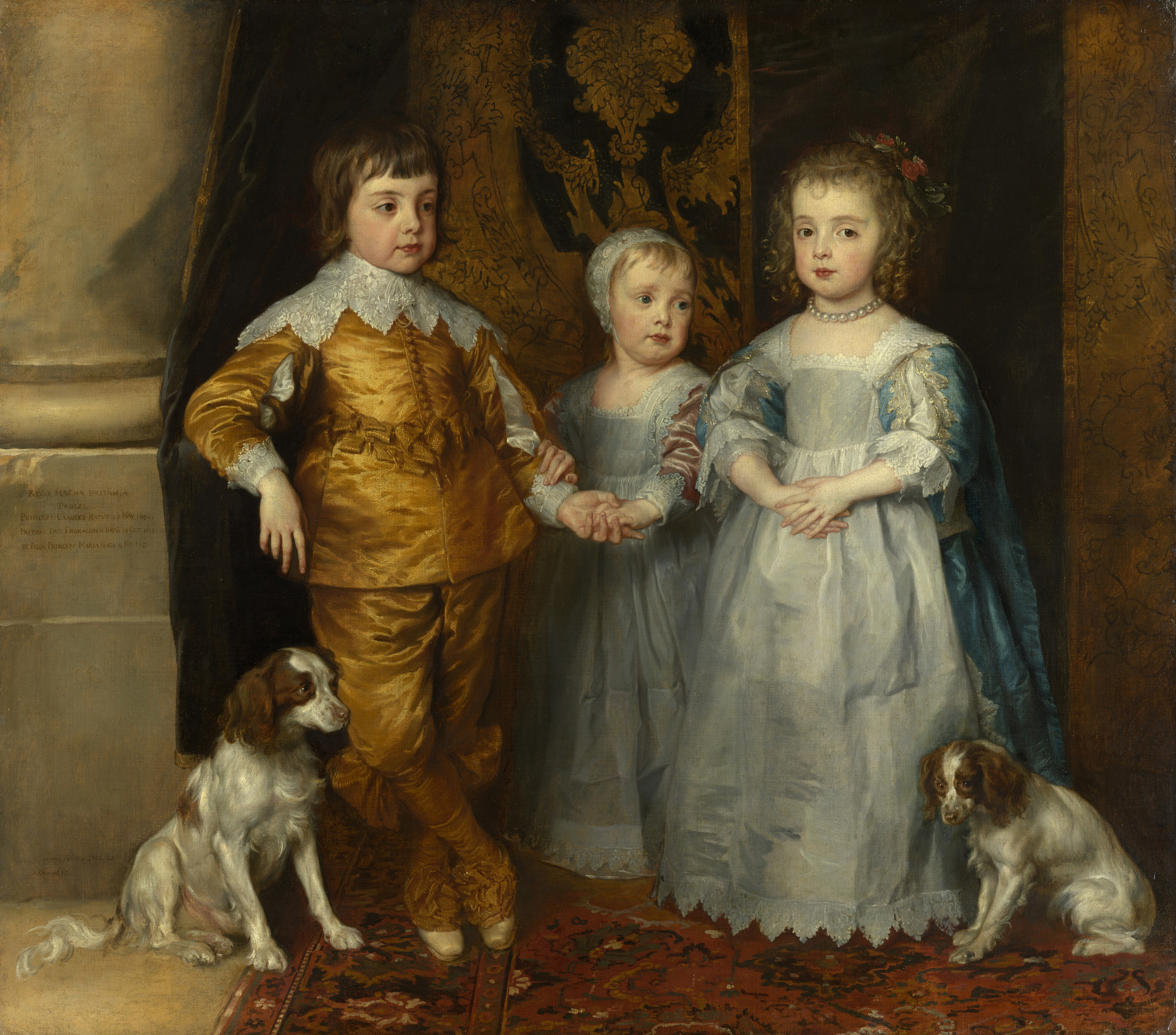
Mary at six years old in 1637 (left) and with her brothers Charles and James in 1636 (right). Portraits by Anthony van Dyck

Mary was born on 4 November 1631 at St. James's Palace, London, the third (but second surviving) child and eldest daughter of Charles I, king of England, Scotland, and Ireland, and his wife, Henrietta Maria of France. She was baptised on the same day of her birth, as there were fears that the newborn princess was not in good health and might die; the ceremony was presided over by William Laud, Archbishop of Canterbury. The girl received her first name in honour of her maternal grandmother, Marie de' Medici, queen of France. Mary's first public appearance took place in 1640 at the baptism of her brother Henry, Duke of Gloucester; she became the only godmother of the little prince.

Mary spent the first years of her life with her brothers and sisters at St James's Palace, as well as at Richmond Palace and Hampton Court. The education of the princesses was entrusted to Jean Ker, Countess of Roxburghe. Mary was known for her grace, beauty, and manners; in addition, she excelled in dancing, but her knowledge of the sciences left much to be desired. The girl's mother, Queen Henrietta Maria, wanted to convert her daughter to Catholicism, for which she introduced a young lady who secretly professed Catholicism to Mary's circle of friends, but King Charles I quickly stopped his wife's actions.

In January 1640, 8-year-old Mary received her first marriage proposal from the 13-year-old William, the eldest son and heir of Frederick Henry, Prince of Orange. The mother of the potential groom, Amalia of Solms-Braunfels, was once a lady-in-waiting and close friend of Mary's aunt Elizabeth Stuart, Queen of Bohemia, which later played an important role in Mary's life. The offer of the House of Orange was at first rejected, because King Charles I and Queen Henrietta Maria wanted other options for their daughter. In 1638, the French noblewoman Marie de Rohan, duchess of Chevreuse, visited London and suggested a marriage between Mary and Balthasar Charles, Prince of Asturias, only son and heir of King Philip IV of Spain and also Mary's maternal first cousin, although the Habsburgs were not aware of this suggestion. A prerequisite for such a union was Mary's conversion to Catholicism, but the princess, who at the request of her mother studied the basics of the Catholic religion, did not want to change her faith. In addition, her mother, Queen Henrietta Maria, was anti-Spanish and was against an alliance with Spain. Charles I Louis, Elector Palatine, Mary's paternal first-cousin, was also a suitor for her hand, but in the end, this proposal also fell through.

== Princess consort of Orange ==
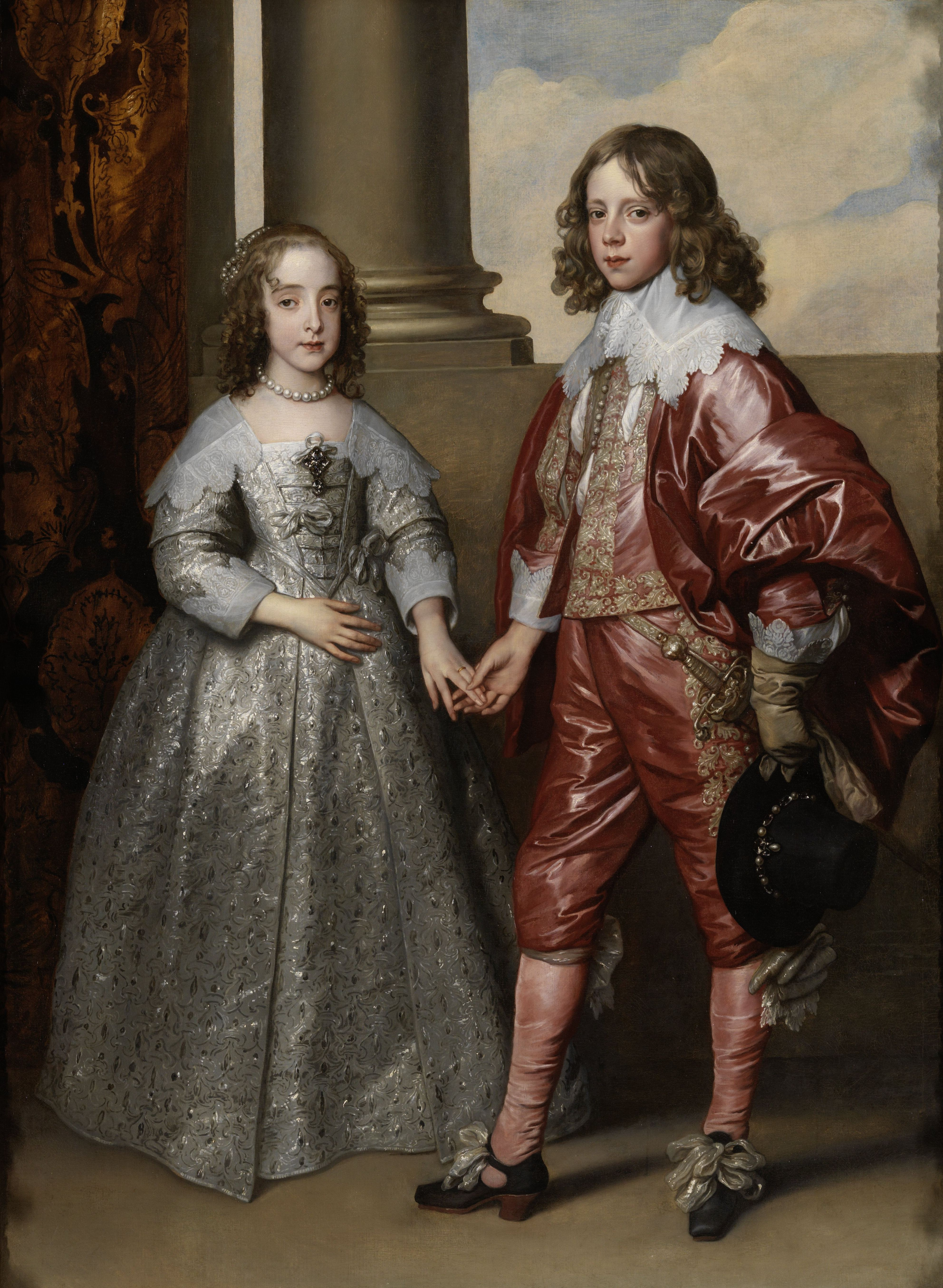
Betrothed William and Mary by Anthony van Dyck, 1641

By the end of the 1630s, relations between the various factions in English society had become very tense; controversies over religion, social relations, morality, and political power became more and more heated. At the same time, Mary's mother, who openly professed Catholicism, became more and more unpopular in the country. In late 1640–early 1641, King Charles I decided to renew negotiations with Prince Frederick Henry of Orange. The negotiations progressed quickly. On 10 February 1641, Charles announced to Parliament that the betrothal of his daughter was actually concluded and that it only remained to consider this union from a political point of view. Charles himself hoped that in case of emergency, the Prince of Orange would help him to maintain royal power in England.

A modest wedding ceremony took place on 2 May 1641 at the Chapel Royal in Whitehall Palace, London. Queen Henrietta Maria was unable to attend the religious ceremony as it was a Protestant one; instead, she watched her daughter's wedding from a small gallery. The marriage of the King's eldest daughter was practically not celebrated in England, as the country was on the verge of a war that broke out in less than a year. The King gave her a crystal and gold casting bottle garnished with rubies and diamonds and a gold chain with the cipher "AR" which had belonged to Anne of Denmark.

Mary and William were congratulated by courtiers, and received several gifts; in addition, in honour of the newlyweds, a volley of 120 guns was fired. After the ceremony, William returned to the Netherlands. According to the marriage contract, Mary could remain in England until she was 12 years old, and her husband would provide her with 1,500 livres per year for personal expenses. In addition, in the event of the untimely death of William, Mary would receive a maintenance of 10,000 livres per year and two residences for her personal use. The marriage contract also provided that Mary and her English attendants could still worship in the manner of the Church of England, rather than join the Dutch Reformed Church.

In early 1642, the situation in the country heated up. Mary and her parents were forced to take refuge in Hampton Court, but the situation steadily turned into open war. In February, Queen Henrietta Maria departed with her daughter to The Hague in the Netherlands; they travelled on a Dutch fleet of fifteen ships. Mary was accompanied to the Netherlands by her governess, Lady Stanhope, who later became her confidant and companion. From a political point of view, the marriage of Mary partially paid off in 1643, when Henrietta Maria persuaded the Dutch government to provide a ship and arms for Charles, and sent them to England.

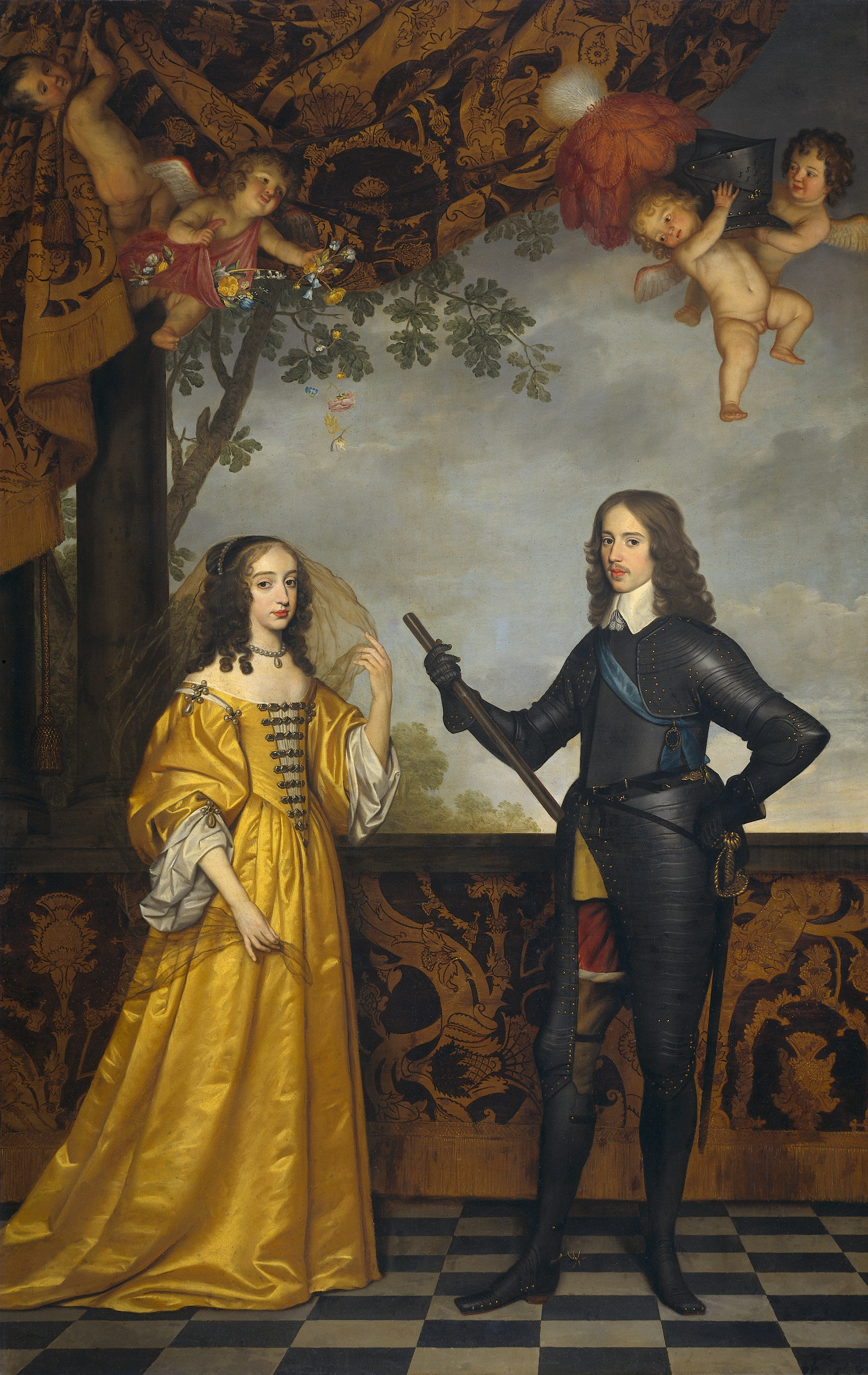
Mary, Princess Royal, and William II, Prince of Orange by Gerard van Honthorst, 1647

Shortly before leaving for the Netherlands, Mary was designated by her father Princess Royal, thus establishing the tradition that the eldest daughter of the British sovereign might bear this title. The title was created because Queen Henrietta Maria, the daughter of King Henry IV of France, wanted her daughter to have a title comparable to "Madame Royale", the style of the eldest daughter of the king of France. Until that time, the eldest daughters of English and Scottish kings were variously titled lady or princess. The younger daughters of British sovereigns were not consistently titled princesses of Great Britain and styled "Royal Highness" until the accession of George I in 1714.

In November 1643, the second marriage ceremony between the 12-year-old Mary and 17-year-old William took place in The Hague. The marriage was not consummated until 1644. In February 1644, Mary completely merged into the life of the Dutch court. She gave audiences, met with foreign ambassadors, and performed all the functions assigned to her with an importance and dignity considered astonishing for her age. In March, she participated in court celebrations of the recent alliance between France and the Netherlands, and led the entertainment that her husband arranged for the French ambassador.

Mary, who was constantly receiving news from England, sympathized with her father Charles' cause. In December 1646, she sent him a letter (via a Dutch merchant ship) urging him to flee to the Netherlands, but Charles declined. In The Hague, Mary developed a very warm relationship with her aunt, Elizabeth, the exiled former Queen of Bohemia. However, Mary didn't develop a good relationship with her mother-in-law Amalia, so she tried to minimize contact with her.

Prince Frederick Henry of Orange died on 14 March 1647. On the day of his death, the States General of the Netherlands was convened, which proclaimed William II to be his father's heir as stadtholder and head of the army; one by one, the remaining titles of her late father-in-law were recognized for Mary's husband, and he became the new prince of Orange. In 1648, Mary was visited by her brothers, Charles, Prince of Wales, and James, Duke of York. In 1649, Mary's father King Charles was executed; subsequently, Mary helped many English Royalist exiles. Among those who were under her patronage was the family of Anne Hyde – the future wife of the Duke of York and mother of two English Queens, Mary II and Anne.

== Co-regency ==
In the autumn of 1647 Mary suffered a miscarriage, after which she could not conceive for several years. (Note: The previous year (when Mary was only fifteen and William twenty) William had had what was referred to as a "dalliance" with Jeanne de Bommert Silvercroon, the daughter of a Swedish diplomat, and this had led to the illegitimate birth of a son, who would become known as Abel Tassin d'Alonne.) In early 1650, she was pregnant again. In late October-early November, when the Princess's pregnancy was coming to an end, her husband fell ill with smallpox and died on 6 November, just after his attempt to capture Amsterdam from his political opponents; eight days after his death, on the day of her nineteenth birthday, Mary gave birth to a son, William. The newborn prince's cradle was draped with black cloth as a sign of mourning for his father. Since the titles of the stadtholder of the Netherlands were not inheritable, the child did not receive them immediately after birth.

Soon after the birth of her son, Mary had several conflicts with her mother-in-law. She planned to name her son Charles in honour of her executed father, but Amalia insisted that the boy be named William, which was a better choice: the first ruler of the United Provinces of the Netherlands was William I of Orange and in addition, the boy's late father also wanted to name his son William. Having won the battle for the name of her grandson, Amalia now wanted to become his legal guardian, referring to the fact that Mary was too young. On 13 August 1651, the Hoge Raad van Holland en Zeeland (Supreme Court) ruled that guardianship would be shared between Mary, her mother-in-law, and Frederick William, Elector of Brandenburg (whose wife, Louise Henriette was William II's eldest sister); the Elector was chosen because he could act as a neutral party mediating between the two women, but also because as a possible heir he was interested in protecting the Orange family fortune, which Amalia feared Mary would squander.

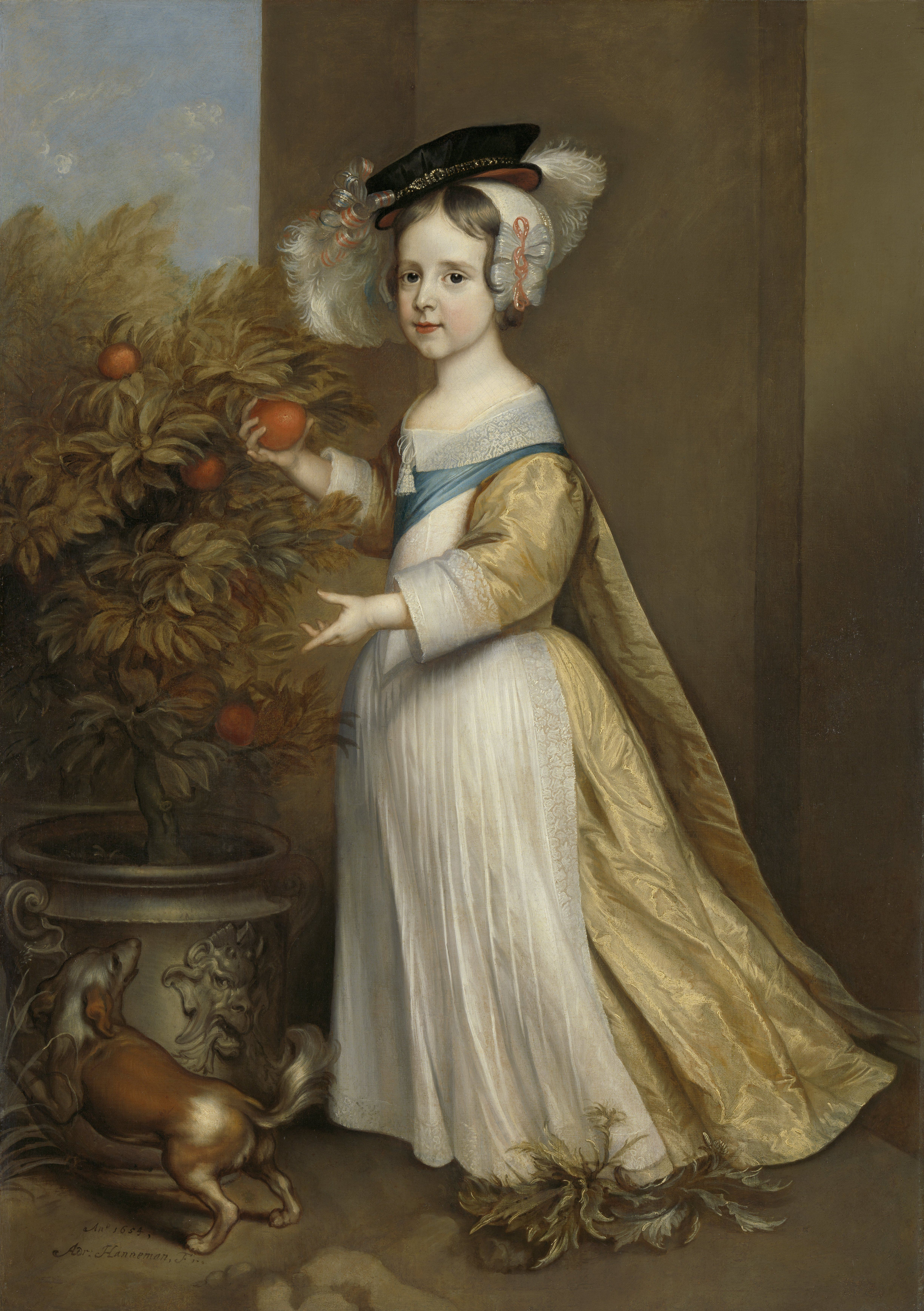
William III, Prince of Orange aged 4, by Adriaen Hanneman, 1654.

In general, Mary was not popular in the Netherlands, which was more sympathetic to Oliver Cromwell; the Princess herself, because of such preferences of the Dutch, refused to hire them to serve her son. In January 1650, Mary, along with her brother James and aunt Elizabeth, planned to modestly commemorate the first anniversary of her father's death, but the Dutch government considered even modest events offensive to the English government. A little later, when envoys from the English parliament were received by the States General, Mary retired to her widow's seat in Breda, but the influence of her party prevented the English from concluding an alliance with the Netherlands. After Mary secretly received her brother Charles II in 1651 (who considered himself the legitimate king of England), the Dutch government forbade her to accept any of her relatives. The household of Mary and her aunt was called a "nest of vipers", weaving conspiracies against the Netherlands, England, and Cromwell in particular.

In 1652, the mood in the Netherlands changed due to the outbreak of war with England. Mary's son was officially elected as stadtholder of Zealand and several northern provinces, but Johan de Witt, the republican leader, prevented William from being elected in Holland. In addition, when concluding a peace treaty, Cromwell insisted on the adoption of the Act of Seclusion, which prohibited Holland from electing a member of the Orange dynasty as stadtholder. Another requirement of Cromwell was the expulsion of all enemies of the Commonwealth from Holland. Mary made an official protest, but it was not taken into account, despite the fact that the country was threatened by civil war; the peace treaty was signed on 27 May 1654.

Mary's worries about the position of her son affected her health. To cut her own expenses in the interests of her brothers, she announced her intention to abandon two of the four palaces at her disposal. In July 1654, she went to a water resort, where she spent a few weeks, and then went to visit her brother Charles in Cologne, where his court was located. She returned to the Netherlands in October, but in July 1655 she again went to Charles in Cologne, visited the fair in Frankfurt incognito, and returned home on 15 November. In January 1656, Mary went to Paris, where her mother and younger sister Henrietta lived, and was received with all honours at the French court.

== Later years and death ==
In the Netherlands, the early widowed Mary was visited by numerous admirers and suitors, among whom was George Villiers, 2nd Duke of Buckingham. According to contemporaries, Charles Emmanuel II, Duke of Savoy, Ernest Augustus, Duke of Brunswick-Lüneburg, and Ernest's brother George William also offered their hands to Mary in Paris. In addition, Cardinal Mazarin showed particular favour to the princess, and also circulated rumours that she was having an affair with (or had been secretly married to) Henry Jermyn, a member of her brother James, Duke of York's household. The rumours were probably untrue, but Charles II took them seriously and tried to prevent any further contact between Jermyn and the princess. Mary left Paris on 21 November and after a two-month stay at her brother's court in Bruges returned to The Hague. Soon after her return, Mary learned that her mother-in-law Amalia had offered Charles II the hand of her daughter Henriette Catherine, which deeply angered the princess. In 1658, Amalia tried to obtain the post of sole regent for her grandson, to whom Mary was also appointed by the Supreme Court, but the princess, with the support of her French relatives, thwarted the intrigues of her mother-in-law.

In November 1659, Mary sent her son to study at Leiden University. On 14 May 1660, the Dutch parliament informed Mary, who was in Breda, about the restoration of the monarchy in England and the accession to the throne of her brother Charles (henceforth King Charles II). A few days later she took part in the celebrations at The Hague on this occasion. Mary henceforth occupied the third place in the line of succession to the English throne after her brothers, James and Henry (although Henry would die later that same year). Her renewed status as an English princess, therefore, helped the attitude towards her in the Netherlands grow more tolerant: in all the cities where Mary and her son passed through or attended solemn events, they were greeted with royal honours. After the Stuart Restoration, it was proclaimed that the Act of Seclusion was void since the English Commonwealth no longer existed. In 1660, Mary, united with her mother-in-law, tried to get the states of several provinces to acknowledge William as future Stadtholder, but many refused at first.

On 30 September 1660, Mary sailed to England, where (her concern for her exiled compatriots and brothers being known) she was warmly received. Upon arrival in London, Mary discovered to her surprise and dismay that her brother the King not only recognized the marriage of James, Duke of York, with Anne Hyde, Mary's former lady-in-waiting, but also declared that their offspring would be princes and princesses of England with full succession rights. This fact upset Mary so much that she decided to significantly shorten her visit to her homeland. She attended the official service at Whitehall Chapel, where everyone who wanted to see her flocked, and also gave a private reception at Whitehall for Elias Ashmole to see some anatomical curiosities. She accepted a monetary gift from Parliament, received in a letter dated 7 November, and asked for a long-promised dowry; to resolve this issue, the King appointed a commission. In November 1660, Mary met with the Embassy of the United Provinces, who came to renew an alliance with England.

On 20 December the English court was stirred up by the news that Mary was seriously ill with smallpox. Having received this news, Queen Henrietta Maria arrived at the bedside of her dying daughter and made a last attempt to convert her to Catholicism, but Mary refused. The Queen managed to insist that her French doctor take over the treatment of the princess, which, as many contemporaries believed, was fatal for Mary, since the doctor was an ardent supporter of bloodletting. On 24 December, Mary signed her will and died on the same day at the age of 29. At her own request, she was buried in Westminster Abbey next to her brother Henry, Duke of Gloucester, who also died of smallpox in September 1660.

In her will, Mary asked the King to take care of the interests of her 10-year-old son, whose sole guardian was now his grandmother Amalia. In 1672, after several years of confrontation with republican leaders in the Netherlands, 21-year-old William was nevertheless elected stadtholder of five provinces, starting with Holland on 4 July, and named commander-in-chief. Five years later, he married his cousin Mary, the daughter of James II and Anne Hyde. In 1688, with the support of English Protestants, William deposed Mary's father and with his wife was proclaimed co-ruler of England, Scotland, and Ireland.

== Ancestry ==
Ancestors of Mary, Princess Royal and Princess of Orange

8. Henry Stuart, Lord Darnley
4. James I of England (VI of Scotland)
9. Mary, Queen of Scots
2. Charles I of England
10. Frederick II of Denmark
5. Anne of Denmark
11. Sophia of Mecklenburg
1. Mary, Princess Royal
12. Anthony, Duke of Vendôme
6. Henry IV of France
13. Joan III of Navarre
3. Henrietta Maria of France
14. Francis I de' Medici, Grand Duke of Tuscany
7. Marie de' Medici
15. Joanna of Austria

== Notes ==
Mary, Princess Royal and Princess of Orange House of Stuart Born: 4 November 1631 Died: 24 December 1660
British royalty
New title	Princess Royal; 1642–1660	Vacant Title next held by Anne, Princess of Orange
