= Proceedings Between Sankey and Petty =

1659 pamphlet by William Petty

A brief of Proceedings between Sr. Hierom Sankey and Dr. William Petty.
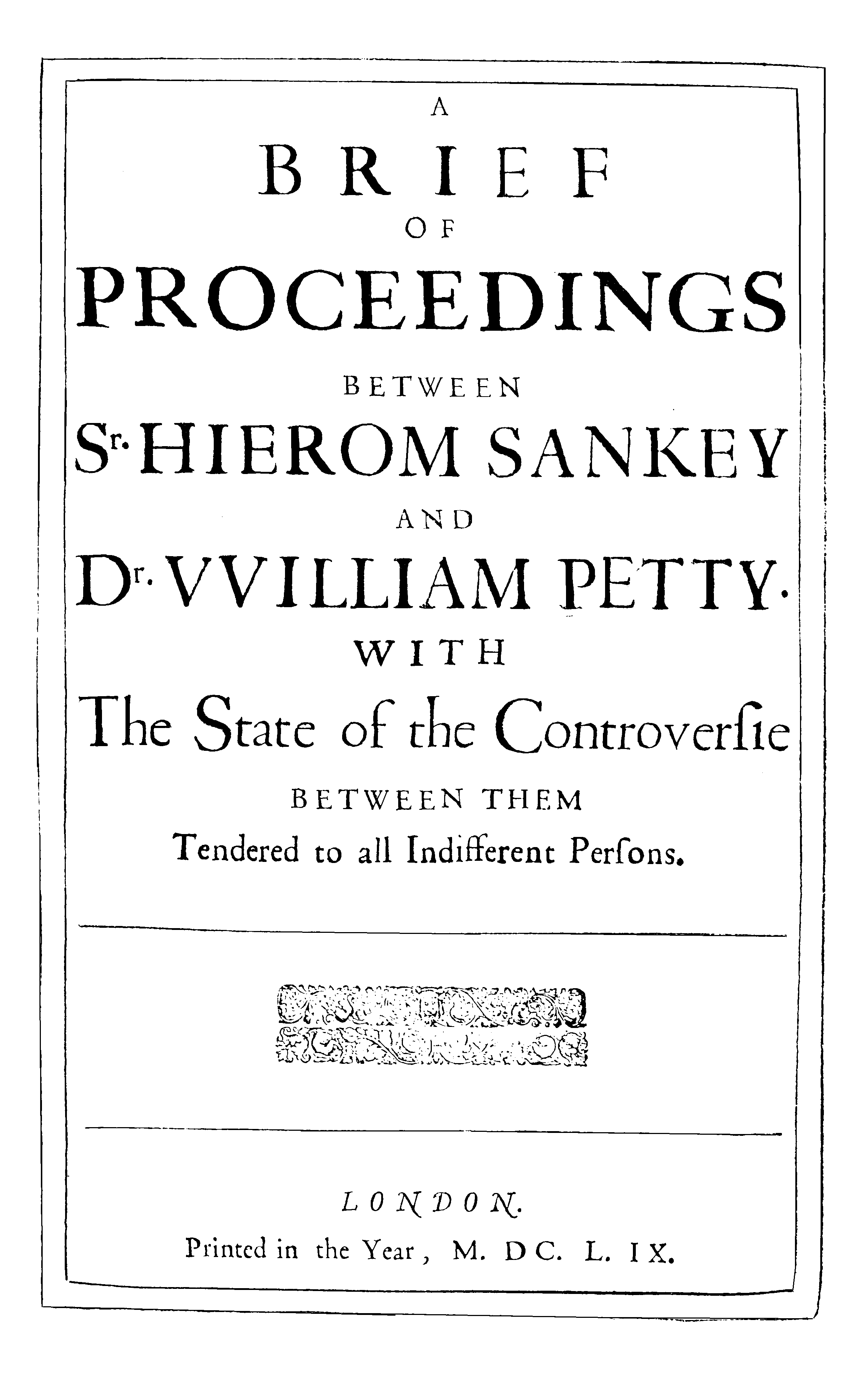
- Title page of Proceeding 1659
- Author: William Petty
- Language: English
- Publisher: London : printed by R[obert]. L[eybourne]. for R.W. at the Star under Saint Peters Church in Cornhill
- Publication date: 1659
- Publication place: United Kingdom
- Pages: 8
- OCLC: 12358812
- Text: A brief of Proceedings between Sr. Hierom Sankey and Dr. William Petty. at Wikisource

The Proceedings between Sankey and Petty is a pamphlet that contains a summary of the controversy that arose between Sir Hierom Sankey and Sir William Petty in the aftermath of the Down Survey. Sankey accused Petty of bribery and fraud. One of the ways in which Petty answered to this accusations was by this pamphlet, that was published in print by Petty in 1659 and covers a total of ten pages.

In 1650 William Petty, who was educated in France and in the Netherlands, became doctor of medicine, professor of anatomy, fellow and vice-chancellor of Brasenose College, Oxford. In 1652 he went to Ireland to assist Oliver Cromwell in his conquest as a physician-general. In 1655 he carried out a large survey of Ireland, the Down Survey and subsequently acquired much land himself. This made him vulnerable for accusations of corruption.

Jerome Sankey, who fought in Cromwell's army in Ireland between 1650 and 1652, had become a Member of Parliament and was knighted by Richard Cromwell in 1659. He was one of the persons that accused Petty of bribery and fraud.

== Bibliographical information ==
Petty, William (1659). A brief of Proceedings between Sr. Hierom Sankey and Dr. Vvilliam Petty. With the State of the Controversie between them tendered to all Indifferent Persons. London. 8 p.

In 1647 and 1648 William Petty had published to short pamphlets: The Advice to Hartlib for The Advancement of some particular Parts of Learning and A Declaration concerning the newly invented art of Double Writing. It took more than ten years before he published a third short text, concerning the Down Survey.

One year after the publication of this Proceedings between Sankey and Petty, Petty published his Reflections upon some persons and things in Ireland, a much larger essay of 200 pages, in which he gave much more information about the Down Survey and also reflected on the charges made against him. He also wrote an extensive manuscript on the Down Survey, which was not published during his life, and appeared in 424 densely printed pages in 1851 as The History of the Survey of Ireland commonly called The Down Survey by Doctor William Petty A.D. 1655-6, edited by Thomas Aiskew Larcom for the Irish Archaeological Society.

References to Bibliographies, Bibliographical databases and online editions
Hull: 4	Keynes: 4	Wing's: P1915A	ESTC: R21000 R21000	BLO: 016197781
search results at Library Hub Discover	EEBO-TCP: A54608	OCLC 12358812 (complete list of all editions)	Wikisource:Proceedings between Sankey and Petty	Proceedings Between Sankey and Petty at Open Library
Proceedings between Sankey and Petty at the Internet Archive	Wikidata: Q47403648			

== Contents ==
The pamphlet first gives a list of six charges brought to the notice of Parliament by Sankey on March 24, 1658/9, with the answers by Petty, given on April 21. Next comes a second list of seven (mostly different) charges by Sankey, with the answers of Petty. Then a third list of eleven accusations by Sankey is given, again of a different nature, and again with answers by Petty.

Finally Petty makes six observations "upon the whole matter". "Petty points out with great satisfaction the discrepancies in the (...) lists. Many of the earlier charges of fraud and bribery had been dropped, and in their place less serious accusations substituted."

== Background ==
In 1655 and 1656 Petty surveyed half of Ireland in what was called the Down Survey.

The Down Survey is one of the projects that brought great fame to Petty, apart from his publications on political economy and political arithmetic. The most important text he wrote concerning the Down Survey – The History of the Survey of Ireland commonly called The Down Survey by Doctor William Petty A.D. 1655-6 – was published in 1851 by Thomas Aiskew Larcom for the Irish Archaeological Society. In some biographies, the years of the Down Survey get a lot of attention. For instance in Fitzmaurice's Life of Sir William Petty two chapters are devoted to the survey and its aftermath.

Petty's way of organizing the survey was not without benefit for himself. He acquired much land in Ireland–John Aubrey says that he owned 50,000 acres at a certain time. This, of course, made him subject to accusations of corruption. The political controversies on the future of Ireland (and England) played an important role in the background.

In 1659 Sir Hierom Sankey raised charges against Petty in the Parliament.

== Bibliography ==
- Bevan, Wilson Lloyd (1894). Sir William Petty: A Study in English Economic Literature. Published as Publications of the American Economic Association, vol. 9, no. 4 (August 1894). Wikisource.
- Fitzmaurice, Lord Edmond (1895). Life of Sir William Petty 1623 - 1687 . London: John Murray – via Wikisource.
- Keynes, Geoffrey (1971). A Bibliography of Sir William Petty F.R.S. and of 'Observations on the Bills of Mortality' by John Graunt F.R.S.. Oxford: Clarendon Press. OCLC 463666032. OL 20749312M.
