= Reflections upon Ireland =

Reflections upon some Persons and Things in Ireland
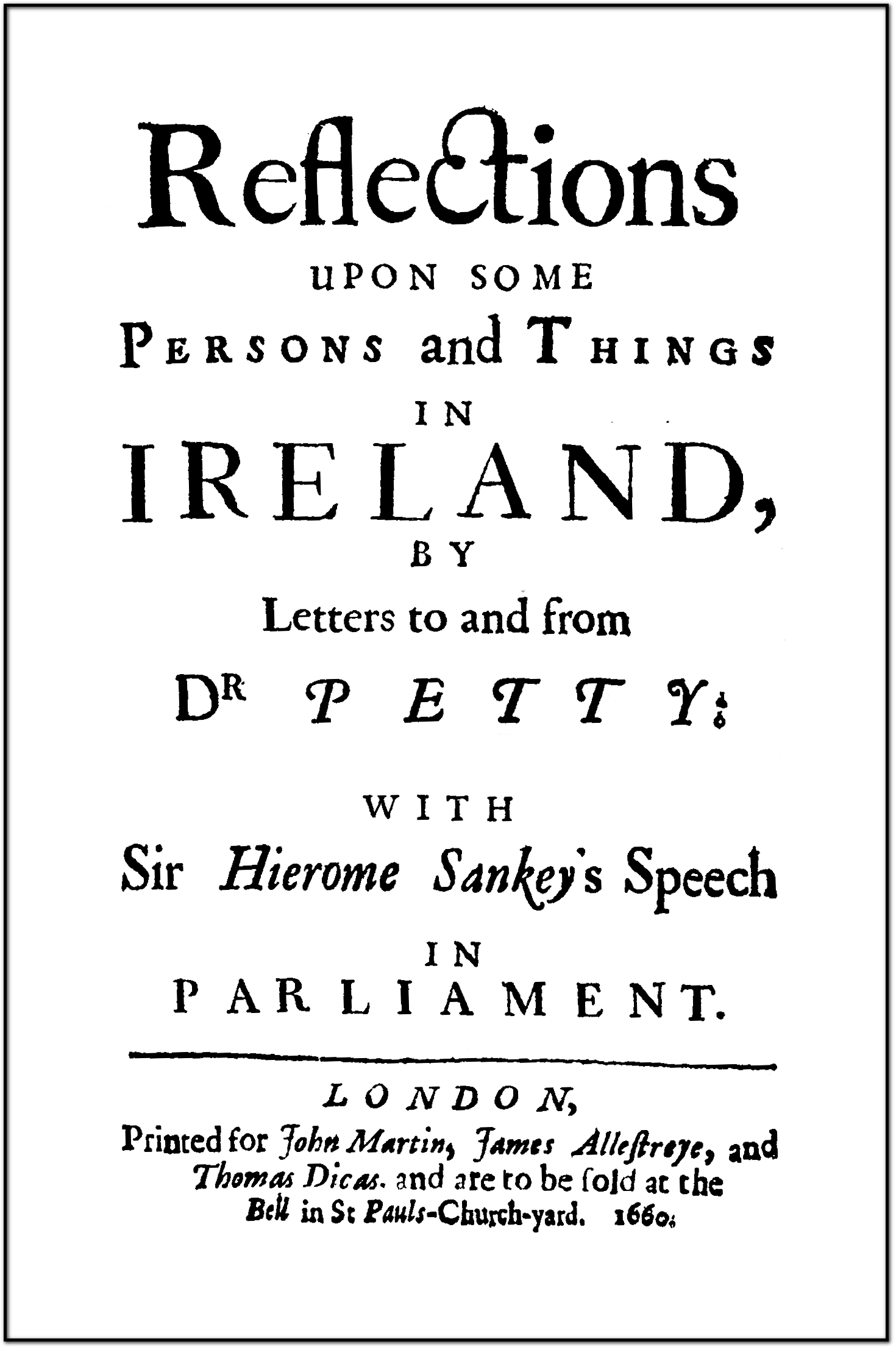
- Title page of Reflections 1660
- Author: William Petty
- Language: English
- Subject: Down Survey
- Publisher: London : Printed for John Martin, James Allestreye, and Thomas Dicas
- Publication date: 1660
- Publication place: United Kingdom
- Pages: 198
- OCLC: 14463125
- Text: Reflections upon some Persons and Things in Ireland at Wikisource

Reflections upon some Persons and Things in Ireland is an essay, written by the English economist and physician Sir William Petty (1620-1687) and published in 1660. It contains a summary of the work carried out by Petty in the so-called Down Survey, and especially a defense against the critics that were cast upon him afterwards. It was a further elaboration of the short pamphlet, titled The Proceedings between Sankey and Petty, that was published by Petty the year before.

Petty had served in Oliver Cromwell's New Model Army during the Cromwellian conquest of Ireland. In 1655, he was placed in charge of the survey which was supposed to provide for the precise re-allocation of land confiscated from the Irish. His opponents in the Parliament of England accused him of bribery and fraud, and the political controversy convinced him that he had to defend himself in writing.

== Historical context ==
William Petty, who was educated in France and the Netherlands, became a doctor in physics in Oxford in 1649. The next year he was elected a fellow of Brasenose College. He also became a Gresham Professor of Music.

In 1651 he went to Ireland as physician-general in Cromwell's army. In 1655 he was in charge of the Down Survey, and acquired much land. This made him vulnerable for accusations of corruption. Jerome Sankey was among the people that accused Petty in Parliament of bribery and fraud. Petty defended himself and published his Proceedings between Sankey and Petty in 1659. One year later he published his Reflections upon some Persons and Things in Ireland (often shortened to Reflections upon Ireland, or simply Reflections) in continuation of the controversy.

In 1659 he also wrote an extensive manuscript on the Down Survey, which was not published during his life, and appeared in print in 1851 as The History of the Survey of Ireland commonly called The Down Survey by Doctor William Petty A.D. 1655-6, edited by Thomas Aiskew Larcom for the Irish Archaeological Society.

== Bibliographical information ==
Petty, William (1660). Reflections upon some Persons and Things in Ireland, by Letters to and from Dr. Petty : With Sir Hierome Sankey's Speech in Parliament. London: Printed for John Martin, James Allesteye, and Thomas Dicas, and are to be sold at the Bell in St Pauls-Churchyard. OL 4007521W. Title page, 185 pp. + Contents (12 pp.).

References to Bibliographies, Bibliographical databases and online versions
Hull: 5a	Keynes: 5	Wing's: P1936	ESTC: R7319	Thomason Tracts: (237)E.1915[1]
British Library: 2892284	BLO: 014765875.	search results at Library Hub Discover	NLI: vtls000526314	EEBO-TCP: n.a.
OCLC 14463125 (complete list of all editions)	OL 17098871M	IA: Petty1660Reflections	Wikisource: Reflections upon Ireland	Wikidata: Q55422223

edition 1790

In 1790 the Reflections upon Ireland was reprinted in Dublin by Zachariah Jackson, for Grueber, and M'Allister, 1790.

Reprint 1790
Hull: 5b	Keynes: 6	ESTC: T106540	British Library: 17661834 and 2892285	search results at Library Hub Discover
NLI: vtls000211881	OCLC 1015515577	OL 16888925M	IA: Petty1790Reflections	Google Books: exFlAAAAcAAJ

== Background ==
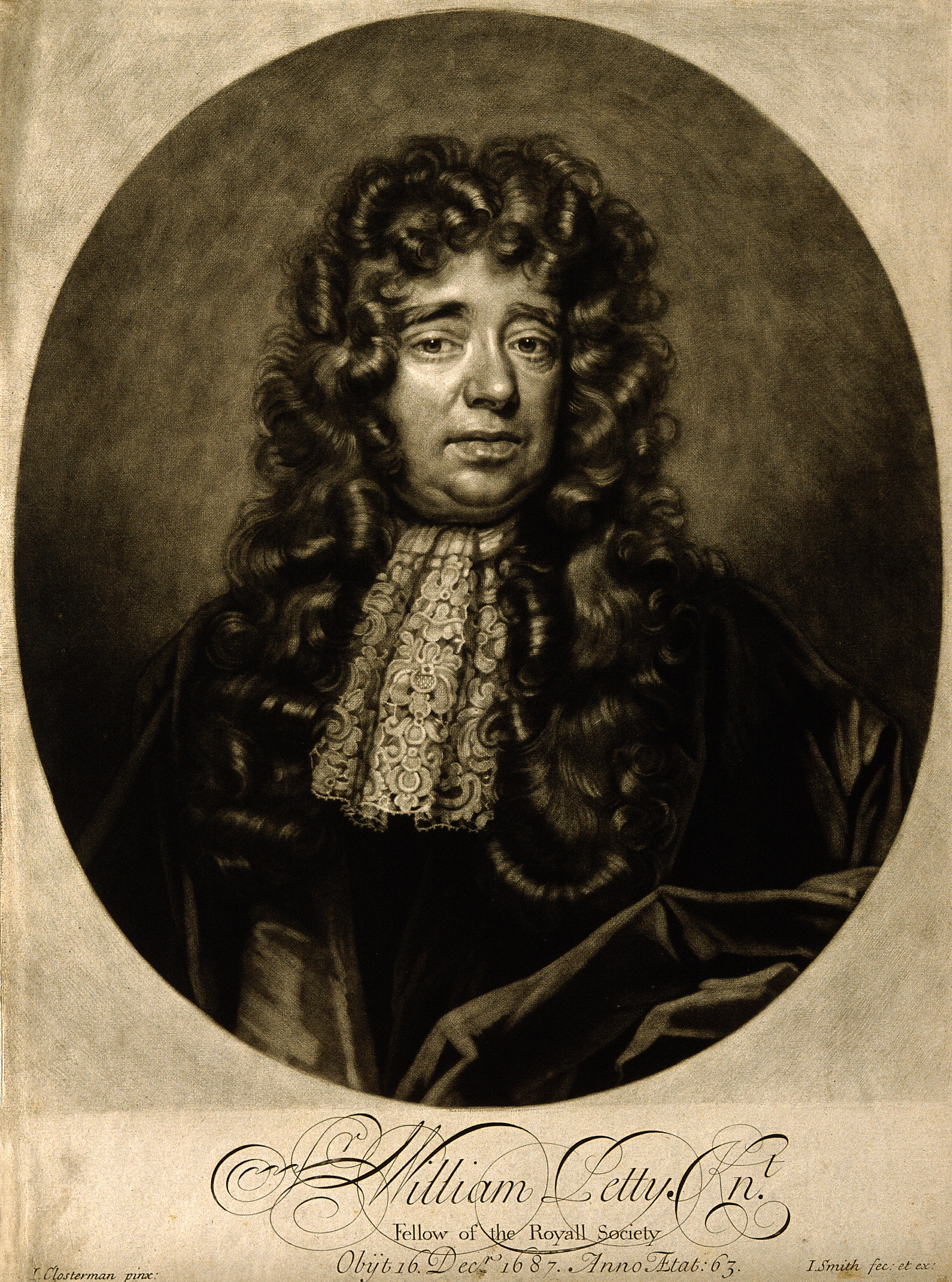
Sir William Petty

In 1659 Petty published his Brief of Proceedings between Hierom Sankey and William Petty, an eight pages account of the accusations brought against him by Sir Hierom Sankey in Parliament. In the preceding years Petty had organized the 'Down Survey' of Ireland. It was a giant operation, to map large parts of Ireland for the first time. There was urgent need of a mapping of the country, to distribute forfeited lands among soldiers and among 'adventurers', individuals that had raised money to finance the Cromwellian conquest of Ireland. Soldiers and adventurers were to be paid in land in Ireland, as part of the plantation campaign of Oliver Cromwell.

During the 'Down Survey', an operation, that was done in very short time, in 1655 and 1656, and that was carried out by a large group of surveyors and other assistants, under the command of Petty, all kind of controversies had risen, concerning the distribution of lands. Petty, being in the centre of the operation, of course also became the centre of criticism by various groups. In the years after the survey, when lands were allotted, conflicts became harsher.

Sir Hierom Sankey was the most eminent spokesman of the officers that were in conflict with Petty. In 1659 Petty published a short account, entitled A brief of Proceedings between Sr. Hierom Sankey and Dr. William Petty, in which an overview was given of the accusation brought against him by Sankey, in regard of his conduct in the 'Down Survey' and the following distribution of lands, and in which Petty also gave a brief defence. A year later he published his Reflections, in which he amplified his defence. He provided some information about the Survey, but most of all he tried to defend himself against the allegations made by Sankey. In this, Petty seems to have enjoyed making a caricature of Sankey.

Of course the controversies between Sankey and Petty must be placed in the broader context of political conflicts of that period.

== Contents ==
The Reflections upon Ireland are structured as a set of letters, written between Petty and an unknown friend, in which the topics, already noted in the Proceedings between Sankey and Petty are treated in more detail.

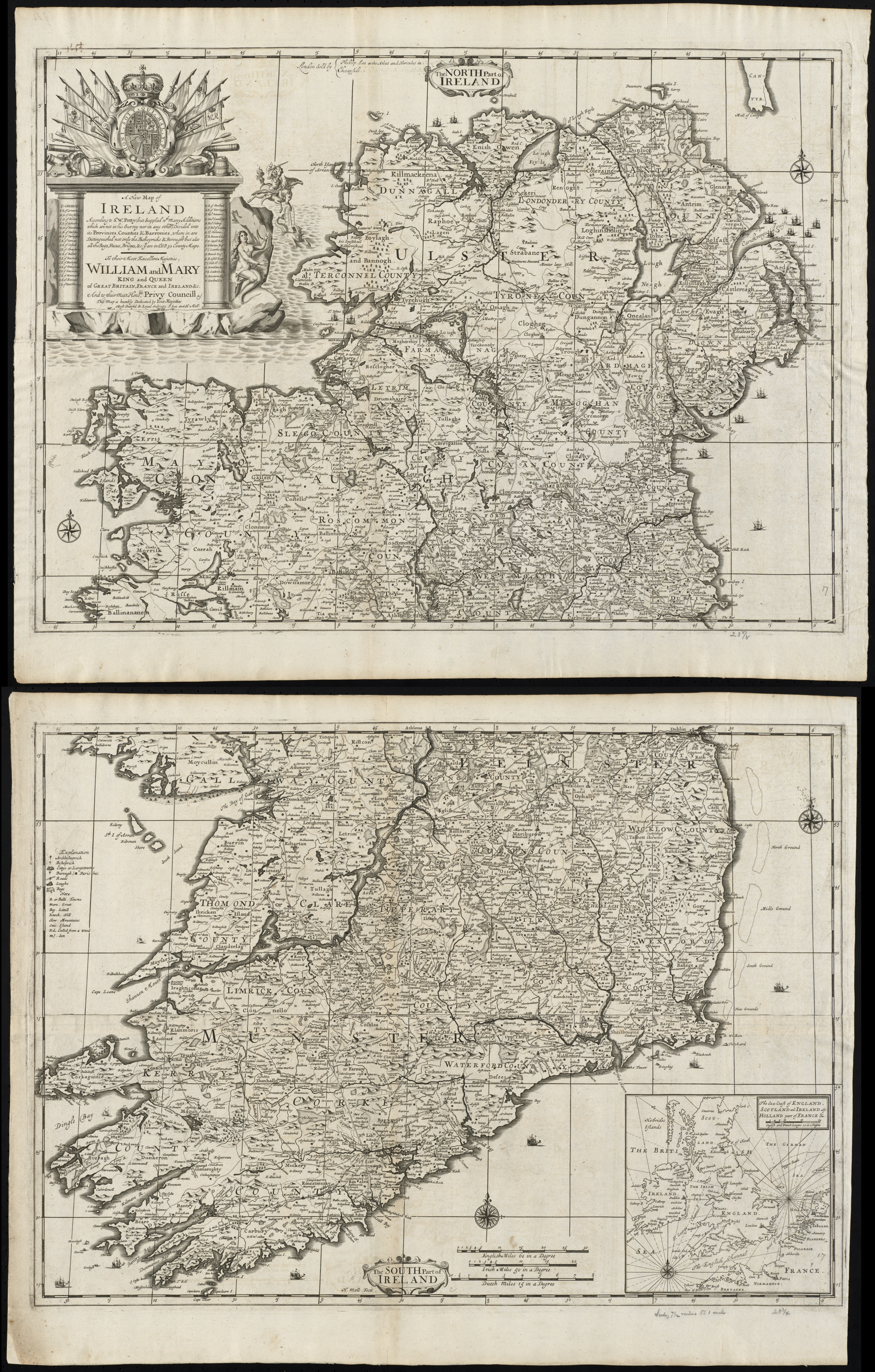
Map of Ireland, 1695; based on Petty's Down Survey maps.

The first nine pages, printed in italic, consist of a letter of the unknown friend, M.H., in which he looks back to the time of their common period as students, to the time that Petty became a professor in Oxford, and to the time he became the chief physician to the governors of Ireland. But now he has heard that one Sankey "(I judge the same that I knew a Foot-ball-Player in Cambridge)" has accused him of fraud and bribery. He asks, what is true of these accusations. The letter of M.H. gives Petty "an admirable jumping-off point" for his extensive reply, that covers the next 145 pages.

At the end of the text follow twelve pages with "A Letter of M.H. to a Noble Person", and two pages with a short letter by a "H.B.". The last pages are the answer by Petty.

When the text is finished twelve pages follow that contain the "Contents". These contents are divided into sections, that do not coincide with the division in letters, neither are they clearly marked in the text.

Keynes remarks that the identity of M.H. is nowhere apparent, and that his style of writing is so remarkably similar to Petty's that Petty may not improbably have been the author of the whole. Fitzmaurice is more explicit when he mentions the letters written by an imaginary correspondent.

The whole book is a polemical essay about the Down Survey and the distribution of lands, that followed. Petty had described the details of the Survey in his unpublished History of the Down Survey in 1655-56. "His Reflections was composed in the heat of controversy and was the necessary means by which Petty might seek to justify himself in the eyes of his friends."

In general the book gives an impression, especially from the letters by Petty himself of a very aggrieved tone, on which he keeps repeating for many pages that he has been treated so badly by all his adversaries, many of whom he mentions by name, and of whom he creates caricatures.
An example:

I have gotten the occasion of practising upon my own Morals, that is, to learn, how with silence and smiles to elude the sharpest Provocations, and without troublesome Menstruums to digest the toughest Injuries that ever a poor man was crammed with.

— page 15/6

At page 141 of the Reflections Petty announces his History of the Down Survey: "I have employed my late leasure to compile a large Volume, wherein what is here wanting is abundantly supplyed." This text would not be published before 1851.

Petty also writes about two further publications on the same subject: "I have also written (...) a profest Answer to Sir Hieromes Eleven last and greatest Articles, containing the proofs of what is herein but barely alledged, which I may not publish till after my tryal. (…) There is another piece of a quite contrary nature, being indeed a Satyre; which though it contain little of seriousness, yet doth it allow nothing of untruth: 'Tis a Gallery wherein you will see the Pictures of my chief Adversaries hang'd up in their proper colours; 'tis intended for the honest recreation of my ingenious friends." These texts are never published.

== Critical reception ==
The Reflections are mentioned very shortly in Wood, Anthony (1691/2) – Athenae oxonienses: "written mostly against his busy and envious atagonist Zanchy (…)."

Thomas Burton, who was a Member of Parliament from 1656 to 1659, mentions the defence of Petty in Parliament on Thursday, April 21, 1659 in his diary, that was published in 1828. The editor gives a link to the Reflections in a footnote.

Bevan, Wilson Lloyd, in his Sir William Petty - A Study in English Economic Literature (1894) describes Petty's career in Ireland rather extensively. He notices that John Aubrey, one of the early biographers of Petty, does hardly touch upon this (important) period in Petty's life. Bevan derives from Petty's own works, chiefly from the History of the Down Survey, with the help of Prendergast's History of the Cromwellian Settlement of Ireland (1863), an account of Petty's activities in Ireland in the period between 1654 and 1660. At the end of this period, after the publication of the broadside entitled Proceedings between Sankey and Petty in 1659, Petty published in 1660 "a more complete vindication", the Reflections. Bevan writes that the "prefatory letter signed J.H." is "an interesting feature of this work" and that he has not been able to identify the writer. "He was an old friend of Petty. Their acquaintance had begun during Petty's stay in Paris. Like other friends of his youth he had seen (…), with surprise and regret, the course of Petty's career in Ireland. Those who had formerly looked upon him as an ardent devotee of science had lamented his defection from their ranks, and begged for an explanation." Petty, in his reply, used the "rather ingenuous assertion" that the Down Survey was a public demonstration of the utility of a scientific approach. But, according to Bevan, the most interesting part of the text is the conclusion. One year ago Petty had not dared to say the whole truth for fear of offending those in power. But now he feels free to explain his unpopularity. Sectarian groups like the Anabaptists were in opposition to Cromwell's policy, but "hesitated to openly oppose a son of the Lord Protector. They then determined to ruin Petty's reputation in order to discredit the Government under which he served."

One year later, Fitzmaurice, Edmond, in his Life of Sir William Petty 1623-1687 writes about the Reflections that it purports to be a correspondence between Dr. Petty and a 'candid friend,' but that the whole of it is the work of Dr. Petty himself. Fitzmaurice quotes extensively from the Reflections, to describe the satirical style of Petty, when describing his adversaries, especially Sankey. In four pages he gives a summary of the doings of Sir Hierome Sankey, and his advisor Benjamin Worsley, the surveyor-general of Ireland, and of Petty's "reflections" on them.

== Bibliography ==
- Bevan, Wilson Lloyd (1894). Sir William Petty - A Study in English Economic Literature . Publications of the American Economic Association, vol. IX, no. 4 – via Wikisource.
- Fitzmaurice, Lord Edmond (1895). Life of Sir William Petty 1623 – 1687 . London: John Murray – via Wikisource.
- Fitzmaurice, Edmond George (1896). "Petty, William (1623-1687)" . In Lee, Sidney (ed.). Dictionary of National Biography. Vol. 45. London: Smith, Elder & Co.
- Hull, Charles Henry (1899). The Economic Writings of Sir William Petty . Cambridge: Cambridge University Press – via Wikisource. in two volumes.
- Keynes, Geoffrey (1971). A Bibliography of Sir William Petty F.R.S. and of 'Observations on the Bills of Mortality' by John Graunt F.R.S.. Oxford: Clarendon Press. OCLC 463666032. OL 20749312M.
