= Larcom =

Larcom is a surname. Notable people with the surname include:

- Thomas Larcom (1801–1879), Irish politician and surveyor
- Lucy Larcom (1824–1893), American teacher, poet, and author
- Larcom Baronets

== See also ==
- Larcombe
