= Jerome Sankey =

Jerome Sankey or Hierom Zanchy was an English soldier and politician who sat in the House of Commons at various times between 1654 and 1659. He served in the Parliamentary army during the English Civil War and later served in Ireland. (Note: Also Hierome Sanky.)

== Early life ==
Sankey was the son of Rev. Richard Sankey, cleric of Hodnet, Shropshire. He matriculated from Trinity College, Cambridge in 1637 and migrated to Clare College, Cambridge on 4 July 1640. He was awarded BA in 1641 and MA in 1644. He was described as "being more given to manly exercises than logic and philosophy, he was observed by his contemporaries to be a boisterous fellow at cudgelling and foot-ball playing, and indeed more fit in all respects to be a rude soldier than a scholar or man of polite party".

== English Civil War ==
On the outbreak of the Civil War, Sankey took up arms for the Parliament, and soon after became a captain, and an independent presbyterian preacher. He was "mentioned in despatches", when on 18 January 1645 Sir William Brereton wrote from Nantwich to the Committee of both Kingdoms stating "Capt. Zanchie who is a very valiant man and commands my own troop, being without any arms was wounded, but it is hoped not mortally". A newsletter from the Parliamentary headquarters near Colchester on 19 June 1648 mentioned him as taking Mersea Fort. In 1648, the parliamentary visitors who were replacing the ejected Royalists at Oxford University made Sankey a Fellow of All Souls College, Oxford and sub-warden. He was appointed proctor of Oxford University "in defiance of all rules" on 4 April 1649 and was ordered to be created DCL in 1649.

== Early service in Ireland ==
Having served as proctor for about a month, Sankey returned to military service and went as a commander to Ireland where "he did good service". In a short time was made colonel of a regiment of horse, with £474 per annum for his salary, besides other advantages. He was also rebaptised as an anabaptist when he went into Ireland. In 1651 and 1652 he was commander in chief of the parliament forces in the county of Tipperary, where, according to members of his party, "he did excellent service for the cause, being then a thorough-paced anabaptist". Sankey's letter of 26 March 1652 from Clonmell, and the Articles of agreement between him and the Council of War for the Parliament, and Colonel Edmund O'Dwyer, Commander in Chief of the Irish Brigades made on 23 March 1652, were read in parliament on 8 April 1652. It was resolved that a letter be written to be signed by Mr. Speaker taking notice of the good service of Sankey and giving him the thanks of Parliament. Bills were made for settling lands in Ireland £200 a year on him and his heirs. In 1654, he was a member of parliament for the counties of Tipperary and Waterford in the First Protectorate Parliament.

== Parliamentary career ==
Sankey was elected MP for Reigate in 1656 for the Second Protectorate Parliament but may have later represented Marlborough. He was knighted by Richard Cromwell on 16 November 1658 (this honour passed into oblivion with the Restoration in May 1660). He was chosen for Tipperary and Waterford in January 1659 but waived his election on 5 March as he was elected MP for Woodstock. At this time he was living as he had some time previously in the house of the Fleetwood in Westminster, and often held forth in conventicles among the anabaptists. It was observed then that he was a dull man.

== Proceedings between Sankey and Petty ==
In 1659 Sankey raised serious suspicions against William Petty, who had organized the Down Survey of Ireland in the preceding years. Sankey charged Petty with bribery and fraud in Parliament. On this accusations Petty replied with a pamphlet titled Proceedings between Sankey and Petty and more extensively in his essay Reflections upon some persons and things in Ireland, published 1660.

== Later service in Ireland ==
On 2 July 1659 Sankey presented to the Committee for Safety and for Nomination of Officers a list of commissioned officers for the forces in Ireland, and made a short speech. On 16 June 1659 the same committee nominated him to be colonel of a Horse regiment in Ireland and he was appointed on 8 July 1659. In the following month, Sankey brought over forces from Ireland, and actively aided in quelling Sir George Booth's Cheshire Rising. Soon afterwards he took his troops back to Ireland, and accordingly his name does not appear in the list of army officer who gave the Restored Rump Parliament so much trouble.

After the Restoration, Sankey remained in Ireland and was one of the "many disaffected persons in Ireland" mentioned in correspondence between Cradley and Secretary Nicholas on 4 June 1662.

Sankey died in Ireland about the latter end the reign of King Charles II.

== Notes ==
Parliament of England
New constituency	Member of Parliament for Counties of Tipperary and Waterford; 1654; With: John Reynolds	Succeeded by John Reynolds; Daniel Abbot
Preceded by Edward Bysshe	Member of Parliament for Reigate; 1656	Succeeded by John Hele; Edward Thurland
Preceded by Major General William Packer	Member of Parliament for Woodstock; 1659; With: Miles Fleetwood	Succeeded by William Lenthall
