= Double Writing (Petty) =

1648 pamphlet by William Petty

A Declaration Concerning the newly invented Art of Double Writing
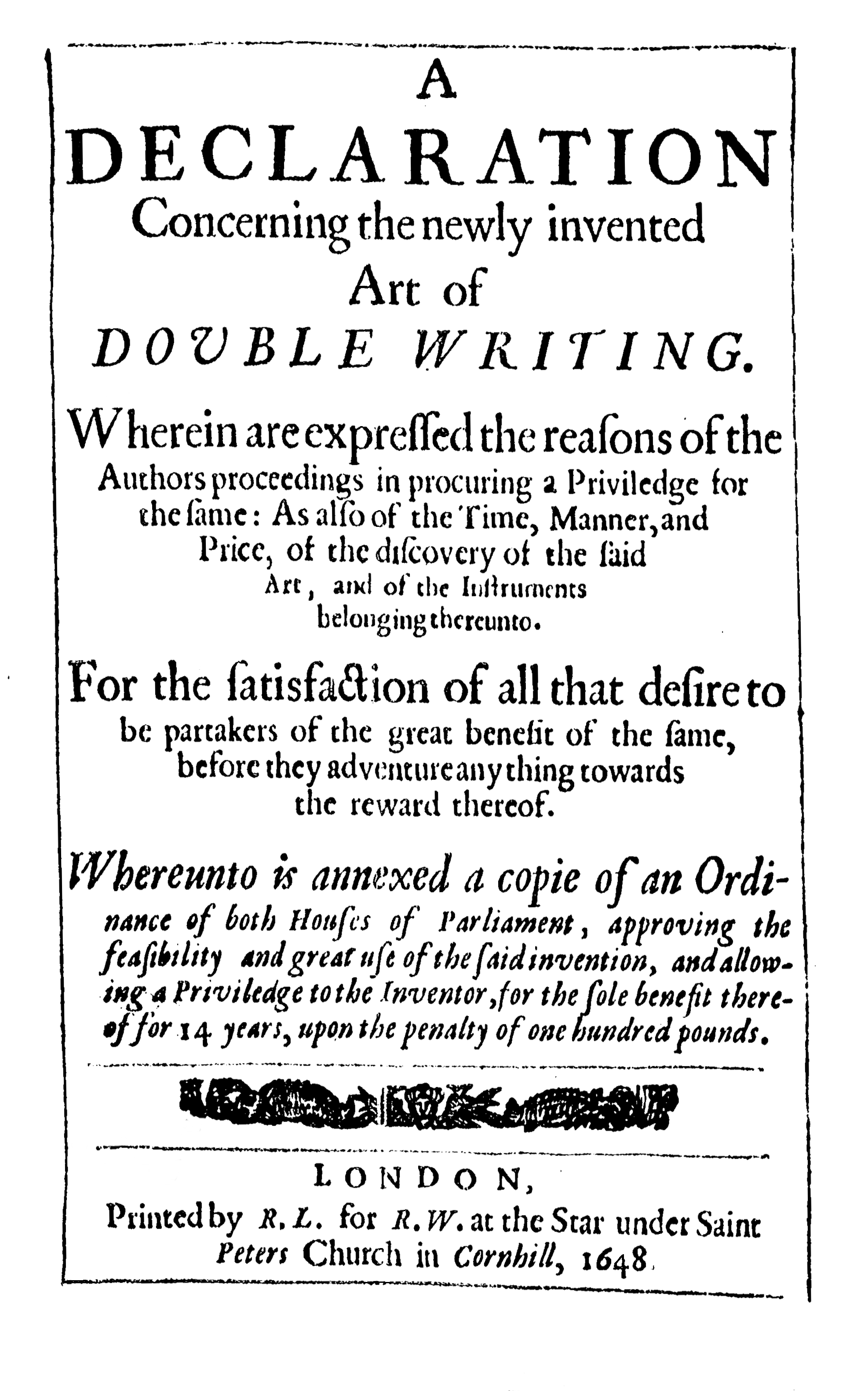
- Title page of Double Writing 1648
- Author: William Petty
- Language: English
- Publisher: London : printed by R[obert]. L[eybourne]. for R.W. at the Star under Saint Peters Church in Cornhill
- Publication date: 1648
- Publication place: United Kingdom
- Pages: 26
- OCLC: 933071718
- Text: A Declaration Concerning the newly invented Art of Double Writing at Wikisource

A Declaration Concerning the newly invented Art of Double Writing was a pamphlet of 6 leaves, written by the English philosopher Sir William Petty (1623–1687) and first published in 1648. It contained information regarding his invention of the "Art of Double Writing", especially a claim for patent rights. It did not contain any information on what his invention exactly was.

William Petty was educated in France and in Holland, and returned to England in 1646, to finish his education in the medical science at Oxford University. He was quite active in many fields of scientific discovery and inventions and developed an instrument for double-writing in 1647. It is mentioned in his first printed publication, titled The Advice to Hartlib (1647).

Petty went to Ireland in 1652 to assist Oliver Cromwell in his conquest and arranged the Down Survey, a cadastral survey of Ireland, between 1654 and 1656.

It would take twelve years, until Petty's next publication appeared in print: the Proceedings between Sankey and Petty.

In 1662 Petty was one of the founding members of the Royal Society.

== Bibliographical information ==
Petty, William (1648). A Declaration Concerning the newly invented Art of Double Writing. London. 6 p.

full title: A Declaration Concerning the newly invented Art of Double Writing. Wherein are expressed the reasons of the Authors proceedings in procuring a Priviledge for the same : As also of the Time, Manner, and Price, of the discovery of the said Art, and of the Instruments belonging thereunto. For the satisfaction of all that desire to be partakers of the great benefit of the same, before they adventure anything towards the reward thereof. Whereunto is annexed a copie of an Ordinance of both Houses of Parliament, approving the feasibility and great use of the said invention, and allowing a Priviledge to the Inventor, for the sole benefit thereof for 14 years, upon the penalty of one hundred pounds.

Already in the Preface of his first printed publication, The Advice to Hartlib (first published 1647), Petty had written that there was "invented an Instrument of small Bulke and price, easily made, and very durable, whereby any Man, even at the first sight and handling, may write two resembling Copies of the same thing at once, as serviceably and as fast (allowing two lines upon each page for setting the Instruments) as by the ordinary way." He then suggested that the returns of that invention might perhaps be enough to pay for the "Ergastula literaria" – the literary work-houses – that he wanted to establish.

Apart from the six page pamphlet on "Double Writing", published early in 1648, in April 1648 Petty also published a single leafed broadside, titled Double Writing, as a further expression of his claim on patent rights. The text of this broadside was in much the same terms as the Preface to Petty's The Advice to Hartlib of 1647/8; it had "an Extract of the Ordinance of Parliament dated 6. Martii. 1647." attached, in which Petty's claim on a patent for 14 years was confirmed.

References to Bibliographies, Bibliographical databases and online editions
| Hull: 1, 2 | Keynes: 2, 3 | Wing's: P1917, P1921 | ESTC: R204724 , R210729 | search results at Library Hub Discover |
| BL: 002892265, 01002892266 | EEBO-TCP: A90628 | EROMM: 498280942, 497660342 | OCLC 61381933 (complete list of all editions) | Wikisource: Double Writing |
| Double Writing at Open Library | IA: Petty1648DoubleWriting | Wikidata: Q47088759 | | |

== Background ==
The instrument for double writing was one of the first attempts of Petty to make money with an invention.

Already early in 1603, a Bavarian Jesuit priest, Christoph Scheiner (1573–1650) had invented a pantograph, a mechanical instrument, in which a pencil was connected to a stylus by means of a parallelogram. The pantograph was intended to create a copy of an image. Scheiner's invention was described in his Pantographice seu Ars delineandi res quaslibet per parallelogrammum lineare seu cavum (1631).

Although it is sometimes thought that the invention was a kind of typewriter, the most probable explanation is that it was some kind of jointed or flexible framework for handwriting with two pens at once. Connor states that the invention of Petty was an adaptation of the pantograph of Scheiner.

The Hartlib Papers hold an anonymous and undated copy of a text about "the nature and uses of the double writing instrument".

On 22 December 1647 William Petty sent a petition to the House of Lords, asking for a patent right. The petition contains a certificate that Petty was able to produce two copies of the first chapter of the Epistle to the Hebrews in 15 minutes.

The patent was passed on 6 March 1648 "under the Great Seal (…) for Seventeen Years".

Samuel Hartlib called Petty's invention the Instrumentum Pettii.

Petty dedicated his 'instrument' to Robert Boyle.

== Contents ==
In Double Writing not a word is said about the invention itself. Petty first explains that he thinks it is unnecessary to enlarge upon the importance of his invention. He next explains in broad terms how he has come to ask a patent on it. And finally he describes how much the use of the instrument will cost.

The last page of the document holds an ordinance of the House of Commons and the House of Lords, dated 6 March 1647, which affirms the claim of a patent, "for the term of 14 yeares".

== Critical reception ==
Petty's activities in the field of inventions are often mentioned by later scholars. But concerning his instrument for double writing in general not much is added to the little, that is known about it from the Double Writing pamphlet.

Fitzmaurice mentions Petty's collaboration with a John Holland of Deptford for three years. This partnership was to be confined to the development of Petty's inventions, "more particularly the double writing instrument, a machine for printing several columns at once, a scheme for making a great bridge without any support on the river over which it stands, and other undertakings of the same kind." Fitzmaurice did not find any record of what the partnership effected.

William Poole places the Double Writing instrument of Petty in the context of a broader interest in building devices for double writing in the 17th century, especially in the 1650s. He claims to unravel the complex history of proposals for such instruments for the first time.

== Wren's Instrument for Double Writing ==
A couple of years later Christopher Wren also referred to a double writing machine in a letter. Wren complained that a model of his own invention, in a still imperfect condition, had been seen by chance by someone, who had reproduced it. The failure of the reproduction of his unfinished invention had made it impossible for him to give to the world his own perfected instrument for multiplying copies of writing. Wren does not mention a name, but the history of Petty's invention leads Bevan "to suspect that he may have been the person whom Wren accuses of this dishonorable act. From what we know of Petty's insensibility to strict honesty, where he saw any chance of furthering his own interests, we cannot say that he was incapable of such an action."

== Bibliography ==
- Bevan, Wilson Lloyd (1894). Sir William Petty: A Study in English Economic Literature. Published as Publications of the American Economic Association, vol. 9, no. 4 (August 1894). Wikisource.
- Fitzmaurice, Lord Edmond (1895). Life of Sir William Petty 1623 - 1687 . London: John Murray – via Wikisource.
- Hull, Charles Henry (1899). The Economic Writings of Sir William Petty . Cambridge: Cambridge University Press – via Wikisource. in two volumes.
- Keynes, Geoffrey (1971). A Bibliography of Sir William Petty F.R.S. and of 'Observations on the Bills of Mortality' by John Graunt F.R.S.. Oxford: Clarendon Press. OCLC 463666032.
