= Hartlieb =

Hartlieb or Hartlib is a German surname. Notable people with the surname include:

- Chuck Hartlieb (born 1966), American football player
- Ernie Hartlieb (born 1979), American ice hockey player
- Geoff Hartlieb (born 1993), American baseball player
- Johannes Hartlieb (c. 1410–1468), German physician
- Max von Hartlieb-Walsporn (1883–1959), German army officer
- Samuel Hartlib (c. 1600–1662), East European-born English polymath

== Other uses ==
- The Advice to Hartlib, a treatise on education written by Sir William Petty as a letter to Samuel Hartlib
- Hartlib Circle, a correspondence network set up in Europe by Samuel Hartlib
