= Larcombe =

Larcombe is a surname. Notable people with the surname include:

- Ethel Larcombe (artist) (1876–1940), British children's book illustrator
- Ethel Thomson Larcombe (1879–1965), English tennis and badminton player
- James Larcombe (1884–1957), Australian politician
- Myra Larcombe (1927–2022), New Zealand swimming coach and police officer
- Tom Larcombe (1881–1967), Australian cyclist

== See also ==
- Larcom
