= Tony Aspromourgos =

Australian historian

Academic background
- Education: University of Queensland; University of Melbourne; University of Sydney
- Influences: Piero Sraffa, Peter Groenewegen

Academic work
- Discipline: History of Economic Thought
- Institutions: University of Sydney
- Website: Information at IDEAS / RePEc

Tony Aspromourgos (born 1957-01-11) is an Australian historian of economic thought, professor at the University of Sydney and a Fellow of the Academy of the Social Sciences in Australia (ASSA). He has published several books and many articles in economic journals on different subjects concerning the history of economic thought, especially on William Petty, Richard Cantillon and Adam Smith.

== Biography ==
In 1978 Aspromourgos did his Bachelor of Economics at the University of Queensland. Three years later, in 1981 he became a Master of Commerce at the University of Melbourne, and in the same year he received his degree as a Master of Arts at the University of Chicago. In 1986, he obtained his Ph.D. at the University of Sydney.

Since 1978 Aspromourgos has held positions at the University of Melbourne and the University of Sydney:

- 1978-1980: Tutor in Economics (University of Melbourne)
- 1980: Senior Tutor in Economics (University of Melbourne)
- 1985-1989: Lecturer in Economics (University of Sydney)
- 1990-1997: Senior Lecturer in Economics (University of Sydney)
- 1998-2005: Associate Professor of Economics (University of Sydney)
- since 2006: Professor of Economics (University of Sydney)

== Work ==
Apart from his specialisation in the history of economic thought, Aspromourgos also specialised in monetary economics, macro-economics and long-period theory.

His research activities were concentrated on William Petty and the origins of classical economics, on Adam Smith, on John Maynard Keynes and on the question of public debt sustainability.

Aspromourgos published in many international economic journals, including Australian Economic Papers, Oxford Economic Papers, and the Review of Political Economy. He is co-editor of the History of Economics Review and serves on the editorial board of the European Journal of the History of Economic Thought.

Aspromourgos is Secretary of ESHET, the European Society for the History of Economic Thought.

== Bibliography ==
=== Books ===
- Aspromourgos, Tony (1996). On the Origins of Classical Economics : Distribution and Value from William Petty to Adam Smith. Routledge Studies in the History of Economics. Vol. 6. London: Routledge. ISBN 9780203434222. OCLC 902307183.
- with Lodewijks, John Kees (2004). History and Political Economy: Essays in Honour of P.D. Groenewegen. London: Routledge. ISBN 978-0415327626. OCLC 252731198. OL 8100209W.
- —— (2009). The Science of Wealth: Adam Smith and the framing of political economy. Routledge Studies in the History of Economics. Vol. 95. London: Routledge. ISBN 978-0-415-46385-0. OCLC 222666243. OL 2929549W.

=== Journal articles ===
- Aspromourgos, Tony (1986). "Political economy and the social division of labour: the economics of Sir William Petty". Scottish Journal of Political Economy. 33 (1): 28–45. doi:10.1111/j.1467-9485.1986.tb00259.x.
