= Down Survey =

Geographical survey of Ireland

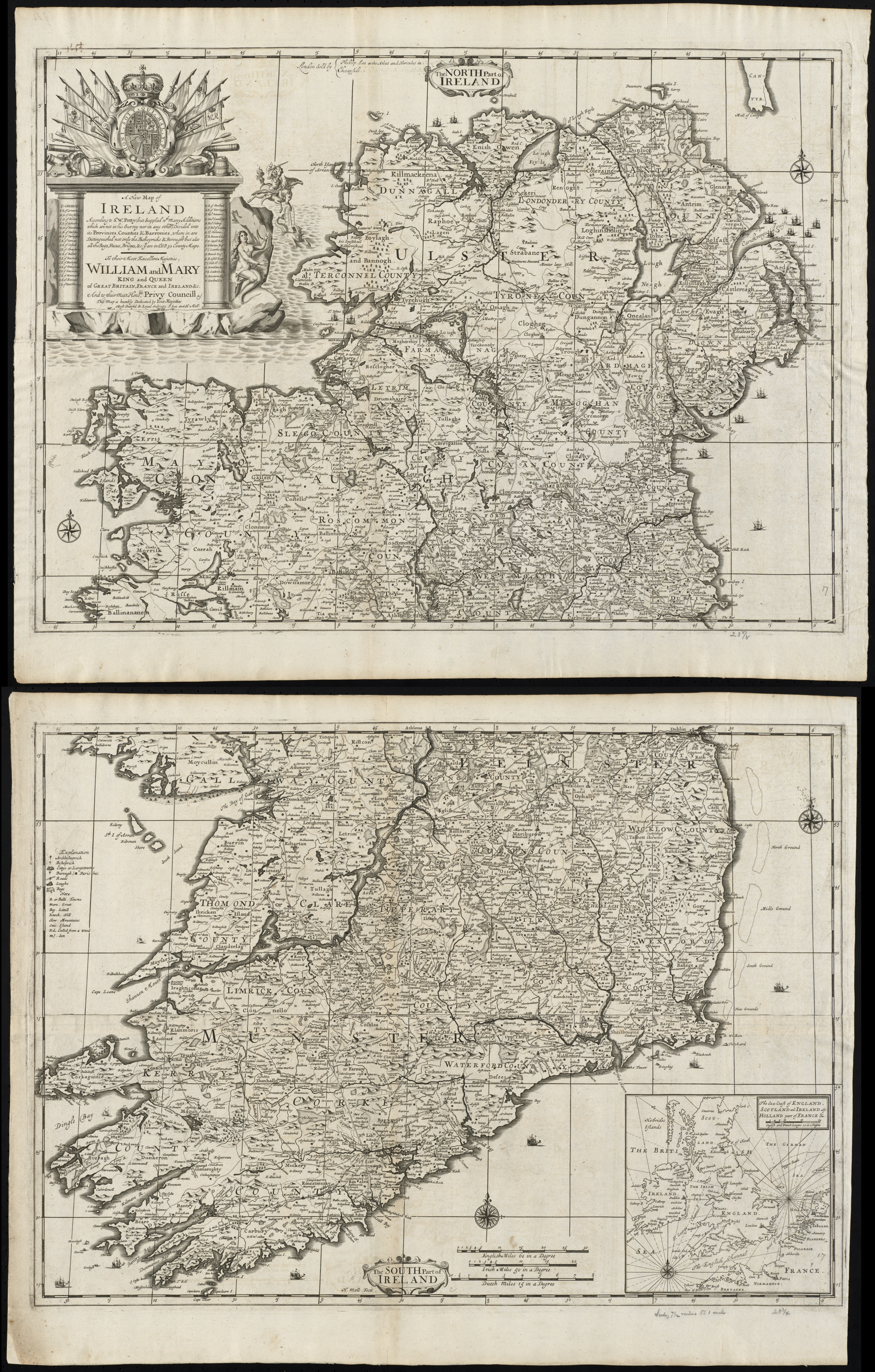
Map of Ireland, 1695; based on Petty's Down Survey maps.

The Down Survey was a cadastral survey of Ireland, carried out by English scientist William Petty in 1655 and 1656. It was created to provide for precise re-allocation of land confiscated from the Irish.

The survey was apparently called the "Down Survey" by Petty, either because the results were set down in maps or because the surveyors made use of Gunther's chain, which had to be "laid down" with every measure. At the time of its creation, it was considered one of the most accurate maps, and the first British imperial survey of an entire conquered nation.

== Background ==
In August 1649, the New Model Army, led by Oliver Cromwell, went to Ireland to re-occupy the country following the Irish Rebellion of 1641. This Cromwellian conquest was largely complete by 1652. This army was raised and supported by money advanced by private individuals, subscribed on the security of 2,500,000 acres (10,000 km^{2}) of Irish land to be confiscated at the close of the rebellion. This approach had been provided for by the 1642 Adventurers' Act of the Long Parliament, which said that the Parliament's creditors could reclaim their debts by receiving confiscated land in Ireland.

The Act for the Settlement of Ireland 1652 provided for the confiscation and re-distribution of the lands of the defeated Irish, mostly Confederate Catholics, who had opposed Cromwell and supported the royalists. Parliamentarian soldiers who served in Ireland were entitled to an allotment of confiscated land there, in lieu of their wages, which the Parliament was unable to pay in full. Lands were also to be provided to a third group, settlers from England and America. The dispossessed landholders were to be transported to Connacht and to some counties in other provinces.

== Survey initiation ==
To facilitate the re-distribution, an accurate survey of the lands was required. Benjamin Worsley, the Surveyor General, had made a survey in 1653. Petty challenged Worsley's direction of the new survey, on the basis that Worsley intended to map only territorial boundaries, to the exclusion of the administrative boundaries introduced from 1520s for local government. The Civil Survey which preceded the Down Survey was not a mapped survey, but provided detailed descriptions of boundaries and valuations of holdings, and its data was used as input to Petty's survey. William Petty, then physician-general to the Irish armies, on a leave of absence from his position as Professor of Anatomy at Brasenose College, Oxford offered to undertake a new survey which would be concluded quickly – within thirteen months, more cheaply than the surveyor-general's proposals, and with a general map of the country. The Government signed a contract with Petty on 24 December 1654.

== Survey methodology ==
The survey employed about a thousand men and was performed with the promised rapidity, not by introducing new scientific methods, but by careful direction of the numerous subordinates among whom the labour was apportioned. Instead of using skilled surveyors, he completed the project using the now-unemployed – and cheap – soldiery. To enable unskilled soldiers to complete the task properly, Petty designed and built some simple instruments. The soldiers were only required to note the position of natural features and then use the chain provided to measure distances. Skilled cartographers then laid the information collected onto gridded paper at a central office in Dublin.

The method used was one of surveying the boundaries of parishes, the block of townlands inside those boundaries was not usually detailed. The scale used was generally 40 Irish perches to an inch (sometimes 80 perches), one perch equalling 21 feet (6.4 m), giving a scale of 1:251.43. This land survey method was used widely in rural Ireland up to the nineteenth century and sorting out the precise details was left usually to the legal profession. As a result, the Down Survey is considered to be about 87% accurate.

Profitable and unprofitable land were distinguished, and there were abbreviated captions for arable, meadow, bog, woodland, mountain and several kinds of pasture, with area figures for each of these categories. Coverage of other subjects was uneven. In the parish maps, dwelling houses with the owners' names are entered in each townland.

Generally speaking, it was a survey of confiscated land. Parts of counties Roscommon, Galway, Clare and Mayo were not surveyed as they had been covered in the Strafford Survey of Connaught (1636–1640) and were anyway not to be confiscated.

== Survey results and payment ==
On the completion of the work, the surveyor-general examined the survey but advised its rejection. A fresh committee accepted the survey on 17 May 1656.

Petty's other requests were reserved for consideration, and only after a delay of more than six months were his sureties released, and his claim for pay acknowledged.

After a delay, he received £18,532 for conducting the survey, to include payment for his assistants and general expenses. He had difficulty in collecting further agreed payments from the army, set at £3,181 which was still due in February 1657. In payment of this debt, 9,665 acres (39 km^{2}) of land were allotted to him.

== Subsequent land allocation ==
Petty also took a prominent share of the subsequent commissioners' work of evaluating and allotting the lands among the claimants, for which he was compensated by assigning him 6,000 acres (24 km^{2}) of land, and permission to buy £2,000 worth of debentures.

As a result of the re-distribution, approximately 7,500 New Model Army veterans settled in Ireland, in what became known as the Cromwellian Plantation.

== Allegations of fraud ==
In the 1650s, Petty was charged with fraud in the survey, by several members of Parliament, particularly Sir H. Sankey – illustrating that this survey involved fortunes for speculators and creditors of the Cromwell government. The allocations of land to Petty by the army in lieu of payment were alleged to be over-stated. His work in allocating the lands also made him open to attack and bribery by those seeking allocation of the limited lands.

Following investigations, he was acquitted, but a dissenting report accused him of magnifying the debt due to him by the army, of charging the army with debts not really due by them, and of reserving for himself portions of choice lands.

Although never convicted of mis-appropriation, charges related to the Irish survey pursued Petty for a number of years. In 1659, Petty published a pamphlet, Proceedings between Sankey and Petty, in which he tried to refute the allegations of fraud by Sankey. This pamphlet was followed, in 1660, by an essay, Reflections upon some persons and things in Ireland, where he explained that he had defected from the ranks of scientists to do the survey "to demonstrate to the public the utility of a scientific training". He further explained his unpopularity by the need to attack him rather than directly attack his leader, Henry Cromwell.

== Impact on Petty ==
Petty gained fame for his Survey of Ireland. It was the first British imperial survey of an entire conquered nation and Petty was given great credit as a pioneer by the Royal Society. The results became part of his life's work. Petty also undertook the first complete mapping of Ireland in 1673 and the first census of Ireland, for the year 1659.

Sir William Petty further used the Down Survey, supplemented with other materials from surveys in 1636–40 and 1656–9, as research towards his 1685 atlas publication, Hiberniae Delineatio, the first printed atlas of Ireland, which used reduced edited versions of his maps.

The survey brought him considerable personal profit. As his reward, he acquired approximately 30,000 acres (120 km^{2}) in the Kenmare area, in southwest Ireland, and £9,000. This was described in Aubrey's Biography of Petty as "50,000 acres [200 km^{2}] visible from Mount Mangorton". By 1658, when Cromwell died, Petty owned so much Irish land that he essentially owned what is now County Kerry.

The English gentleman, Evelyn, who knew Petty well, spoke of him:

The map of Ireland, made by Sir William Petty, is believed to be the most exact that ever yet was made of any country.

== Resulting documents ==
The resulting maps of the parishes, all drawn by Petty himself, were preserved in the Surveyor General's office and in the Public Record Office in Dublin. The original Down Survey parish maps were lost in a fire in the Surveyor General's office in 1711, and the authenticated copies of the parish maps were lost in fires at the Public Record Office in the Four Courts during the Irish Civil War of 1922.

Petty also edited the parish maps into barony maps.

The details listed in terriers beside the maps include the names of previous owners of the lands, religious affiliation, land valuation, and area. The maps themselves include townland boundaries, and sometimes houses/castles, roads and fields. It listed the owners of land in 1640, and the new owners.

Considering the time and circumstances in which these maps were executed, their accuracy is surprising, and they continue to be referred to as trustworthy evidence in courts of law even at the present day.

=== Parish maps ===
Copies of a number of the parish maps survive in various institutions. The National Library of Ireland holds a set of Down Survey parish maps copied by Daniel O'Brien in the 1780s and purchased in the 1960s from a firm of Dublin solicitors. These maps cover land in counties Cork, Dublin, East Meath (Meath), King's County (Offaly), Leitrim, Limerick, Longford, Queen's County (Laois), Kilkenny, Tipperary, Waterford, Westmeath, Wexford and Wicklow. In some cases, summary barony maps have been included, though these barony maps are not necessarily fully comprehensive.

=== Barony maps ===
Some copies of the original Down Survey barony maps survive. The Public Record Office of Northern Ireland (PRONI) has a set in the Annesley Collection. The British Library acquired another set in recent years. The best set, a personal set of Sir William Petty's, is in the Bibliothèque Nationale de France. It seems that set was en route by sea to London in 1707, when a French vessel captured the ship. The Bibliothèque Nationale subsequently received the maps. The Ordnance Survey Office, Dublin, published a facsimile set of these maps in 1908.

== Related publications ==
- A full account of the proceedings in connection with the survey, from the will of Petty, was edited by Sir Thomas A. Larcom for the Irish Archaeological Society in 1851.
- The terms of reference of the survey are given in Andrews, J H Plantation acres: an historical survey of the Irish surveyor and his maps. Belfast, Ulster Historical Foundation, 1985, P 21–22.

=== Publications of the maps ===
- Trinity College Dublin have published the Down Survey maps on tcd.ie
- The National Library of Ireland Down Survey maps are issued on microfilm to readers.
- Surviving parts of the maps have been published by the Irish Manuscripts Commission as DOWN SURVEY (1654–1656)
- Copies of both Hiberniae Delineatio and the edited barony maps are available in Special Collections at UCC.
- Another group of maps from this Survey, the parish maps, are available in microfilm at UCC.

== See also ==
- Bodley Survey
- Peyton Survey
