= Of Education =

1644 work by John Milton

Of Education is a treatise by English poet and polemicist John Milton, published in 1644. It first appeared anonymously as a single eight-page quarto sheet. Presented as a letter, written in response to a request from the Puritan educational reformer Samuel Hartlib, it represents Milton's most comprehensive statement on educational reform, and gives voice to his views "concerning the best and noblest way of education". As outlined in the tractate, education carried for Milton a dual objective: one public, to "fit a man to perform justly, skillfully, and magnanimously all the offices, both private and public, of peace and war"; and the other private, to "repair the ruins of our first parents by regaining to know God aright, and out of that knowledge to love Him, to be like Him, as we may the nearest by possessing our soul of true virtue".

== Influences ==
The influences at work in the tractate are an interesting blend of Renaissance humanism with its emphasis on the via activa, tempered by the more contemplative medieval concern with personal redemption. It is clear, however, that the overwhelming thrust of Milton's educational programme as outlined in the tractate is centred in the public objective. This is likely a reaction to the scholasticism that dominated the medieval university from the twelfth century, which still held sway in Milton's time.

Important individual influences on Milton's tractate include Spanish educator Juan Luis Vives (1492–1540) and Moravian educator John Comenius (1592–1670). Both Vives and Comenius rejected the dialectical approach in education in favour of empirical observation and "the study of things rather than words, nature rather than books". In an interesting fusion of empiricism and morality, both educators promoted the idea that the study of nature was instrumental to the formation of moral character.

== Milton's educational views ==
=== Medieval education ===
The objective of medieval education was an overtly religious one, primarily concerned with uncovering transcendental truths that would lead a person back to God through a life of moral and religious choice. The vehicle by which these truths were uncovered was dialectic:

To the medieval mind, debate was a fine art, a serious science, and a fascinating entertainment, much more than it is to the modern mind, because the medievals believed, like Socrates, that dialectic could uncover truth. Thus a 'scholastic disputation' was not a personal contest in cleverness, nor was it 'sharing opinions'; it was a shared journey of discovery.

The learners in the Middle Ages were the clerics who comprised the literate segment of medieval society and who were responsible for the production, transmission and exposition of scholarly texts, both sacred and classical. Their 'shared journey of discovery' had become, by Milton's time, an academic exercise so divorced from the practical realities of life as to render medieval education repulsive to Renaissance humanists in general, and to Milton in particular, for whom "the scholastic grossness of barbarous ages" did little more than immerse students in "unquiet deeps of controversy", leaving them with "ragged notions and babblements" and "such things chiefly as were better unlearned". Milton dismissed the medieval curriculum which produced such scholars as the "scragged and thorny lectures of monkish and miserable sophistry", and sought to liberate it from the scholastic yoke from which he believed it desperately needed rescuing.

=== The Medieval curriculum ===
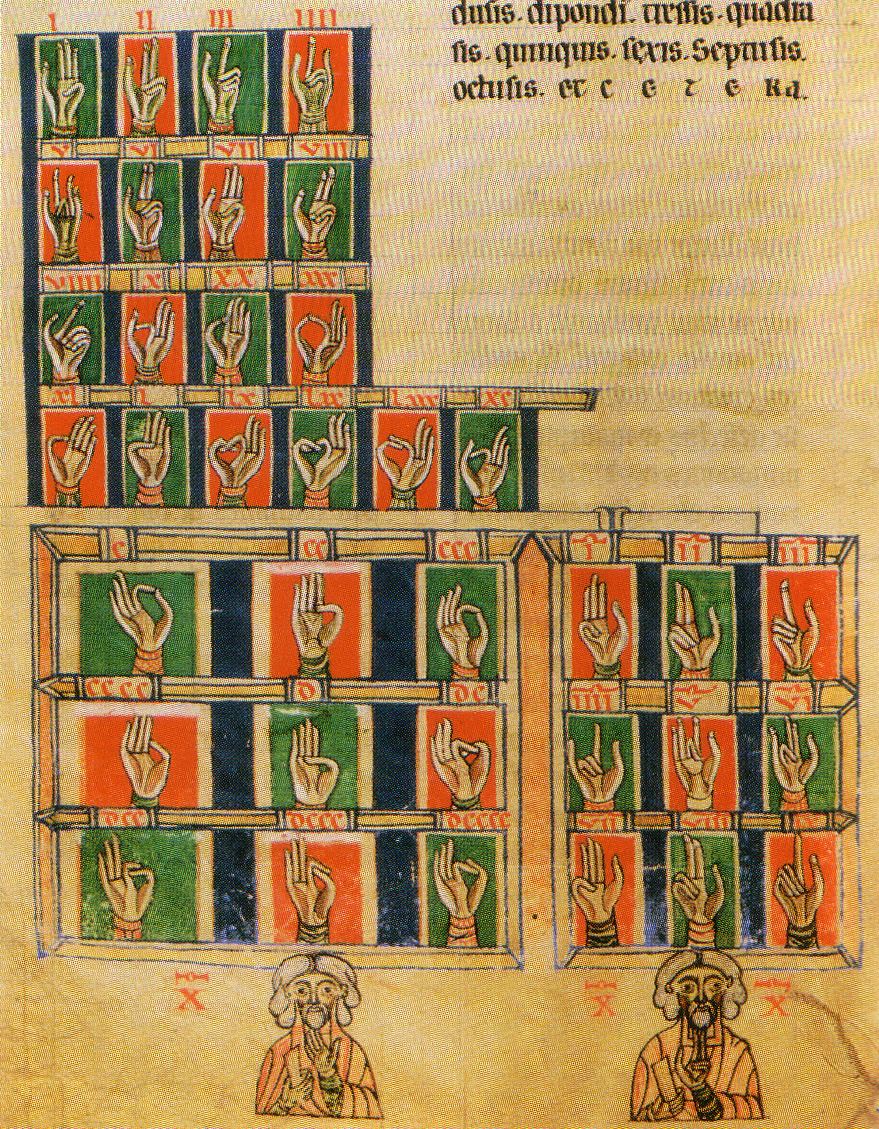
Numerical finger codes, from the De Numeris by Raban Maur, thirteenth century.

The medieval curriculum was characterised throughout by a preoccupation with the speculative. It began with the trivium, which included the study of grammar, rhetoric and dialectic. Grammar instruction dominated the early years of a student's education, where the focus, as Witt explains, was exclusively linguistic: "…in a school program where the student aimed at perfecting a prose style largely divorced from classical precedents, the emphasis in teaching grammar fell on providing instruction more in the mechanics of the language than in ancient literature". The trivium laid the groundwork for the quadrivium, which turned its attention to the theoretical in the world of number, including the study of arithmetic, geometry, music, and astronomy. These two foundational programmes prepared the medieval university student for the study of philosophy and theology with its heavy emphasis on dialectical reasoning.

=== Milton's proposed curriculum ===
Milton is clear in the tract about the "many mistakes" that encumbered the medieval curriculum, which he censures as making "learning generally so unpleasing and unsuccessful" in his time. His first target is the instruction of grammar. Milton is critical both of the amount of time spent on it as well as its mechanical emphasis: "we do amiss to spend seven or eight years merely in scraping together so much miserable Latin and Greek as might be learned otherwise easily and delightfully in one year". Progress, in his view, is delayed by unnecessarily "forcing the empty wits of children to compose theme, verses, and orations"; instead, he proposes that after some foundational grammatical instruction, students should "be won early to the love of virtue" by having "some easy and delightful book of education" from among the ancient classics read to them. The objective is not simply to teach grammar, but to "inflame [students] with the study of learning". This, for Milton, was best accomplished through the reading of great literature.

After grammar, Milton takes up the cause of curricular sequence. He derides the medieval practice of "present[ing] their young unmatriculated novices, at first coming, with the most intellective abstractions of logic and metaphysics" after having only recently left "those grammatic flats and shallows where they stuck unreasonably to learn a few words with lamentable construction". Instead, he proposes "beginning with arts most easy"; that is to say, those "most obvious to the sense". His method, as Riggs notes, is an inductive one, starting with the study of "sensible things", and progressing to "things invisible" only after mastering the former. This move effectively inverts the deductive method common in medieval education. The "organic arts" of rhetoric and logic therefore find a place at the end of Milton's curriculum, rather than at the beginning. Noteworthy too is Milton's inclusion of poetry amongst the other organic arts: "poetry would be made subsequent, or indeed, rather precedent, as being less subtle and fine, but more simple, sensuous, and passionate".

Milton's proposed curriculum, encompassing as it does grammar, arithmetic, geometry, religion, agriculture, geography, astronomy, physics, trigonometry, ethics, economics, languages, politics, the law, theology, church history as well as the "organic arts" of poetry, rhetoric and logic, is encyclopaedic in scope. His main thrust in the educational enterprise remains, however, on that practical erudition which would serve both the individual in a moral sense and the state in a public sense, equipping people "to be brave men and worthy patriots, dear to God and famous to all ages". This stands in contrast to the contemplative and speculative concerns of medieval education.

=== Influences from Renaissance humanism ===
As Ainsworth points out, "Milton, like other genuine humanists, cared little for virtue apart from practice, or for talent without principle". Milton's desire to marry scholarly pursuits to commitments of a professional and public nature is, as Ainsworth implies, an over-riding characteristic of Renaissance humanism. Briefly stated, the humanist educational agenda of the fifteenth and sixteenth centuries included "a clearer consciousness, among teachers and students, of education as a discipline for active life", combined with "an insistence on the more extensive reading of ancient writers both classical and Christian as a means of securing this discipline" and "an attitude of severe and hostile criticism toward medieval education and culture".

=== The changing demands of society ===
The shift in educational concerns evident in the Renaissance was informed by the changing structure of society at this time. The ecclesiastical world of the Middle Ages, which was well served by its clerics, slowly gave way, in the sixteenth century, to a burgeoning bureaucratic world, served by the clerks who oiled the machinery of government, "keeping records, accounts, and correspondence". A linguistic and salvational emphasis in education was no longer tenable as the Puritans came to demand a general and practical education for their children. Education thus became concerned with "instilling into students a consciousness of themselves as national subjects" where moral concerns were public as well as private. Milton's tractate fits well into this trajectory in its accommodation of education "to the needs of an age".
