= Larcom baronets =

Extinct baronetcy in the Baronetage of the United Kingdom

The Larcom Baronetcy was a title in the Baronetage of the United Kingdom. It was created on 24 December 1868 for Major-General Thomas Larcom. He was Under-Secretary for Ireland from 1853 to 1868. The second baronet was a lieutenant-colonel in the army and served in the New Zealand Wars from 1863 to 1864. The title became extinct on the death of the fifth baronet in 2004.

== Larcom baronets (1868) ==
- Sir Thomas Aiskew Larcom, 1st Baronet (1801–1879)
- Sir Charles Larcom, 2nd Baronet (1843–1892)
- Sir Thomas Perceval Larcom, 3rd Baronet (1882–1950)
- Sir Philip Larcom, 4th Baronet (1887–1967)
- Sir (Charles) Christopher Royde Larcom, 5th Baronet (1926–2004)

== Arms ==
Coat of arms of Larcom baronets

Crest
On a cap of maintenance Azure turned up Ermine a martlet Sable with a fleur-de-lis in its beak Or.
Escutcheon
Argent on a mount a hawthorn bush Proper and in chief an eagle displayed Gules.
Motto
Le Roy La Loy
