= Irish Archaeological Society =

Learned society active 1840-1855

The Irish Archaeological Society (sometimes spelled as "Irish Archæological Society") was a learned society, founded in 1840. Among the founders were the scholar John O'Donovan and the Rev. Dr. Todd, who acted as secretary.

The Irish Archaeological Society was one of the first text publication societies of Ireland. It published scholarly material on the history of Ireland from 1841 to 1855. In 1854 it merged with the Celtic Society, to form the Irish Archaeological and Celtic Society.

== Publications ==
In 1841 the first publication of the Irish Archaeological Society appeared:

- Tracts Relating to Ireland, printed for the Irish Archæological Society. Vol. I. Dublin. It contained:
  - Minutes of the First Annual General Meeting of the Society.
  - The Circuit of Ireland by Muircheabtach Mac Neill, by Cormacan Eigeas (A.D. 942). Translation and Notes by John O'Donovan.
  - A Brief Description of Ireland, by Robert Payne (1590). Edited by Aquilla Smith.

In 1843 appeared:

- Tracts Relating to Ireland, printed for the Irish Archæological Society. Vol. II. Dublin. It contained:
  - A Treatice of Ireland, by John Dymmok (c.1600). From a MS. preserved in the British Museum, with Notes by The Rev. Richard Butler.
  - Annales de Monte Fernandi ("Annals of Multifernan"). Edited by Aquilla Smith.
  - A Statute of the fortieth Year of Edward III., enacted in a Parliament held in Kilkenny, A.D. 1367, before Lionel, Duke of Clarence, Lord Lieutenant of Ireland. From a MS. in the Library of his Grace the Archbishop of Canterbury, Lambeth. With Translation and Notes by James Hardiman.

In 1844 was published:

- The Genealogies, Tribes and Customs of Hy-Fiachrach, commonly called O'Dowda's Country. Edited by John O'Donovan.

In 1846 the first and only volume appeared of:

- The Miscellany of the Irish Archaeological Society.

In 1851 was published:

- The History of the Survey of Ireland commonly called The Down Survey by Doctor William Petty A.D. 1655-6, written by William Petty in 1659, and edited by Thomas Aiskew Larcom.

In 1855 was published:

- Leabhar Imuinn: The Book of Hymns of the Ancient Church of Ireland. Edited by James Henthorn Todd. (Work on this book was begun under the auspices of the Irish Archaeological Society, but by the time it was published it had become the Irish Archaeological and Celtic Society.)

== Bibliography ==
- Welch, Robert (2000). The Concise Oxford Companion to Irish Literature. Oxford: Oxford University Press. ISBN 978-0192-800-800.
