= The Advice to Hartlib =

1647 treatise by William Petty

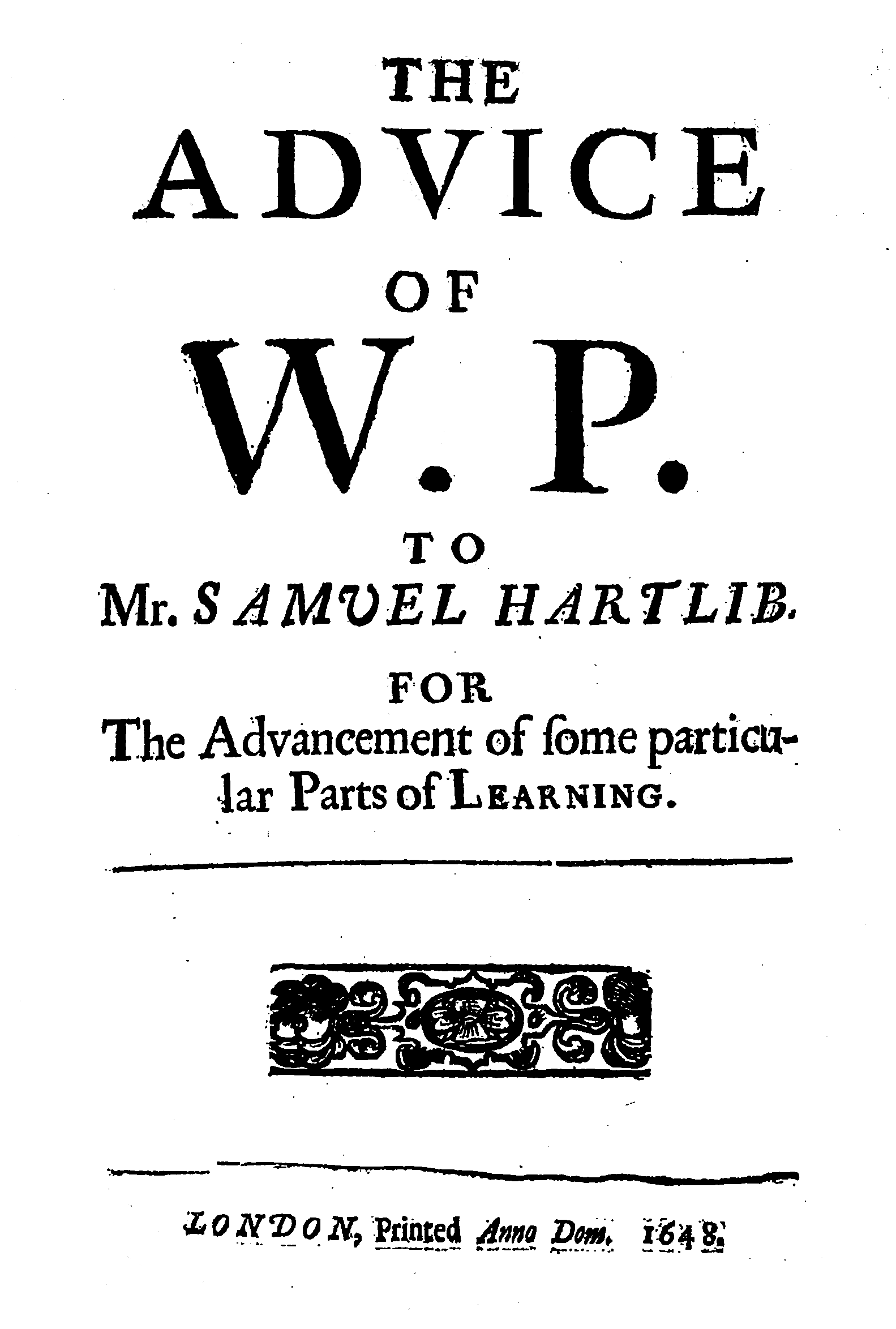
- Author: William Petty
- Language: English
- Publication date: 1647
- Publication place: United Kingdom
- Pages: 26
- OCLC: 933071718
- Text: The Advice to Hartlib at Wikisource

The Advice to Hartlib was a treatise on education, written by the English economist and philosopher Sir William Petty (1623–1687) in 1647 as a letter to Samuel Hartlib. and published in 1647/8. It was the first printed work by Petty and covers a total of 31 pages.

William Petty was educated in France and in Holland, and returned to England in 1646, to study medicine at Oxford University. By that time he had close contacts with scientists like Thomas Hobbes. He developed an instrument for double-writing and became friends with Samuel Hartlib and Robert Boyle.

Samuel Hartlib (c. 1600 – 1662) had a profound interest in many fields of science and was especially active in creating (written) contacts with a number of persons, often scientists, part of whom were members of the Hartlib Circle. He had a clear vision on the importance of education and the spread of knowledge. In 1644 John Milton (1608–1674) wrote his tract Of Education as a letter to Hartlib. Hartlib himself wrote a pamphlet concerning education in 1647. The Advice to Hartlib was William Petty's contribution to the debate.

== Bibliographical information ==
Petty, William (1647). The Advice of W.P. to Mr. Samuel Hartlib. for The Advancement of some particular Parts of Learning. London. 26 p.

References to Bibliographies, Bibliographical databases and online editions
Hull: 3a, 3b, 3c, 3d	Keynes: 1	Wing's: P1914, P1914A	ESTC: R5444, R 33397
BLO: 014764413.	search results at Library Hub Discover	BL: 002892260	EEBO-TCP: A54605.
OCLC 933071718 (complete list of all editions)	Wikisource: The Advice to Hartlib	The Advice to Hartlib at Open Library	IA: Petty1948Hartlib
Wikidata: Q44414768

The pamphlet was reprinted in The Harleian Miscellany, London 1745, vol. vi, pp. 1–13 and London 1810, vol. vi, pp. 1–14.

In 1862 large parts of the text were reissued in Barnard, Henry – English Pedagogy, under the caption of 'Plan of an Industrial School'.

Parts of the Advice were also reproduced in Ulich, Robert (1954) – Three Thousand Years of Educational Wisdom.

== Background ==
In the days that Petty published his treatise, Samuel Hartlib was the patron of up-and-coming young men. He had a stimulating influence on many others in persuading them to publish their ideas. In 1644 for instance, John Milton (1608–1674) wrote his tractate Of Education as a letter to Hartlib. In 1647 Hartlib himself published a tract, advocating the establishment of an 'office of public address'. This office would have as a main function the dissemination of information about new inventions.

William Petty, aged 27, got involved in this debate about education, and published his Advice.

== Contents ==
The first page of Advice to Hartlib is a kind of advertisement for an instrument for "double writing" that was invented by Petty (and that would again be introduced in his pamphlet Double Writing in 1648), "which is not strictly relevant to the rest of the pamphlet."

On the next page, with the title "To his honoured friend Master Samuel Hartlib", Petty dedicates his treatise to Samuel Hartlib, and describes the main issue of his treatise as "the Advancement of Reall Learning."

John William Adamson (1857–1949), who was a professor of education in the University of London in the beginning of the twentieth century, wrote extensively on the history of education and devoted a chapter of his Pioneers of Modern Education 1600–1700 (1905) to the two letters to Hartlib by Milton and Petty. He supposes that Hartlib may have received Milton's Of Education with mixed feelings, "there being in it both strictures and recommendations from which he was bound to dissent." Adamson thinks that Hartlib on the other hand, "must have extended a whole-hearted welcome" to The Advice of W.P. to Mr Samuel Hartlib, for the Advancement of some particular Parts of Learning. Petty was in full sympathy of the "New Philosophy", of which Francis Bacon can be regarded as the founder, and of which Hartlib was an enthusiastic promoter.

Adamson points out that Petty lays some stress on the word "Real", "a significance roughly paralleled by the German use. Petty says that he has "had many flying thoughts, concerning the Advancement of Reall Learning in generall, but particularly of the Education of Youth, Mathematicks, Mechanicks, Physick, and concerning the History of Art and Nature", and he believes that his letter to Hartlib "can please only those few, that are Reall Friends to the Designe of Realities, not those who are tickled only with Rhetoricall Prefaces, Transitions and Epilogues, and charmed with fine Allusions and Metaphors (all of which I do not condemn)."

In the body of the pamphlet, titled 'The Advice for Advancement of some particular Parts of Learning', which has a total of 26 pages, Petty begins with placing himself in the tradition of Francis Bacon ("Lord Verulam").

Adamson splits the "Advice" in four parts:

- pp. 1–3, in which Petty recommends the institution of Hartlib's cherished project of a General Intelligence Department, the "Office of Publick Address," whose officers shall search all existing records of inventions with the purpose of compiling a catalogue, making reference to such records easy.
- pp. 4–6, in which Petty explains that the material so arranged will make plain where invention is most wanted, and that capable men are thereupon to be set to work in the quarters thus discovered.
- pp. 7–17 create an image of how Petty's corps of researchers would proceed to their own especial work. This shows resemblance to Bacon's "New Atlantis".
- pp. 17–26, the last division of the letter, in which Petty tries to find an answer to the question which books must be studied in the schools, and have to be written. Among these the "History of Arts or Manufactures" might first be undertaken.

Petty's letter opens with the remark that he has strong sympathies with Hartlib's idea to create an 'Office of Publick addresse' and is willing to donate all the money he gains with his invention of "Double Writing" to this good cause.

He states that the Advancement of Learning should begin with a large survey of all that is already known to mankind, and by means of that to discover what is not yet known.
This survey should start by perusing all books and taking notice of all "Mechanicall Inventions". All the "Reall or Experimentall Learning" may be sifted and collected. To that purpose every book must be read by two separate persons, who must get exact directions for their work. This may finally result in one book, a kind of catalogue (or encyclopedia), consisting of many volumes, with index tables or other assistance for ready finding, remembering and understanding of all things contained in the books.

In order to fulfill this task, Petty proposes the establishment of "universal schools", 'Ergastula Literaria,' or 'Literary Workhouses,' in which children may be taught to read and write. To these institutions all children of seven years old might be sent, none being excluded by reason of the poverty or inability of their parents. But, as Wilson Lloyd Bevan observes in his Sir William Petty: A Study in English Economic Literature of 1894, "in these literary work-houses a child would not only learn reading and writing. He should be taught to do something towards supporting himself. Education should begin by training the powers of observation and strengthening the memory, by directing both to the objects of sense."

Petty further proposes that 'the business of education' should not be committed to the worst and unworthiest of men; but that it be seriously studied and practised by the best and ablest persons. The study of arithmetic and geometry he recommends to all students. But also some 'gentile Manufacture' like making watches and musical instruments, botanics, chemistry and anatomy should be part of the curriculum.

Next Petty suggests the establishment of a 'Gymnasium Mechanicum,' or 'College of Tradesmen for the Advancement of all Mechanicall Arts and Manufactures,' to be such that one at least of every trade (the prime most ingenious workman) might be elected a Fellow, and allowed therein a handsome dwelling rent free. From such an institution the projector conceived that all trades not only 'would miraculously progress and new inventions be more frequent, but that there would also be the best and most effectual opportunities and means for writing a history of Trades in perfection and exactness.' Adamson remarks that the general scheme is that of "Solomon's House, as depicted in Bacon's 'New Atlantis.

Within the walls of the Gymnasium there was also to be a 'Nosocomium Academicum,' or model hospital for the benefit of the scientific practitioner, as well as of the patient, and a complete 'Theatrum botanicum', 'stalls and Cages for all strange Beastes and Birds, with Ponds and Conservatories for all exotick Fishes'. The design concludes with the expression of a regret that no 'Society of Men' as yet exists 'as careful to advance arts as the Jesuits are to propagate their religion.'

A large part of The Advice to Hartlib consists of a detailed description of the 'Nosocomium Academicum'. It could be made out of an old hospital, and could be overseen by three or four curators. The staff of the hospital should consist of a Mathematician for Steward, a Physician, Chirurgeon and Apothecary. They would be assisted by a vice-physician, a student, a chirurgeons mate and an apothecaries mate, two apprentices and nurses. The tasks of the different staff members are described.

The following pages of The Advice to Hartlib are reserved for the books, that should be used in the schools. Petty first refers to "Master Pells three Mathematical Treatises". He then proposes compiling a work with the title Vellus Aureum sive Facultatum Lucriferarum discriptio Magna (the Golden Fleece, or great description of the Money-making Faculties), "wherein all the practesed wayes of getting a Subsistance and whereby Men raise their fortunes, may be at large declared.". An extensive description follows of this compilation, that is sometimes referred to as a "History of Trades".

The Advice to Hartlib concludes with the expression of a regret that no 'Society of Men' as yet exists 'as careful to advance arts as the Jesuits are to propagate their religion,' and with a suggestion of a work on the lines of Bacon's 'Advancement of Learning,' which should be a treatise on 'Nature free,' or on arts and manufactures relieved of restraint, in contrast with a 'History of Nature vexed and disturbed,' or of trade under the restraints of the then existing commercial system.

== Ergastula Literaria ==
The literary work-houses, or 'Ergastula Literaria', which are proposed by Petty in his Advice to Hartlib have become a symbol for the spirit of educational renewal in the seventeenth century. Together with his 'Gymnasium Mechanicum', his 'Noscomium Academicum' and the 'Theatrum Botanicum' they can be found in different studies on the history of education throughout the following ages.

The phrase 'Ergastula Literaria' is meant "to cover a whole theory of Education, and that a revolutionary one."

Petty "anticipates Pestalozzi and Froebel when he insists that instruction must follow the lines indicated by the child's natural propensities for learning, that the child is essentially an active creature, who learns best by doing, and that he must be taught in reference to his powers and needs of the moment, and not by ways which respect his future only."

== Critical reception ==
The only work in which Petty wrote extensively about education has acquired quite some attention in scholarly circles. His concept of the Ergastula Literaria is often mentioned.

Bevan, Wilson Lloyd, in his Sir William Petty: A Study in English Economic Literature (1894) gives a rather extensive description of the Advice to Hartlib, naming it "the Tractate on Education". He considers the work, in its "youthful performance", as a demonstration of Petty's "cast of mind", showing the strength and weakness of his character. He writes among other things about the difference between the visions of Milton and Petty on educational reform.

Anderson, John William, professor of Education in the University of London, mentions Petty as one of the "Pioneers of Modern Education" of the seventeenth century. Anderson gives much attention to the "universal schools" that Petty wanted to establish, the "Ergastula Literaria", "a phrase which is meant to cover a whole theory of Education, and that a revolutionary one."

According to Knox, H. M., professor of Education at Queen's University Belfast, who wrote an essay about The Advice to Hartlib in 1953 the work was difficult to find for a long period, until it was republished in 1876, and again in 1946. Knox starts his essay with the following statement: "To few it is given to write an enduring treatise on education at the age of twenty-four (he means: twenty-seven), but few possess the versatile genius of Sir William Petty." Knox also makes a comparison with the tractate Of Education of John Milton, published 1644, and thinks that the Advice to Hartlib is "full of original matter worthy of detailed study".

== Bibliography ==
- Adamson, John William (1905). Pioneers of Modern Education 1600–1700. Cambridge: Cambridge University Press. (reprint 1921).
- Bevan, Wilson Lloyd (1894). "Sir William Petty – A Study in English Economic Literature" . Publication of the American Economic Association. IX (4): 1–102. OCLC 615596640 – via Wikisource.
- Fitzmaurice, Lord Edmond (1895). Life of Sir William Petty 1623 – 1687 . London: John Murray – via Wikisource.
- Hull, Charles Henry (1899). The Economic Writings of Sir William Petty . Cambridge: Cambridge University Press – via Wikisource. in two volumes.
- Keynes, Geoffrey (1971). A Bibliography of Sir William Petty F.R.S. and of 'Observations on the Bills of Mortality' by John Graunt F.R.S.. Oxford: Clarendon Press. OCLC 463666032. OL 20749312M.
- Knox, H.M. (1953). "William Petty's advice to Samuel Hartlib". British Journal of Educational Studies. 1 (2): 131–142. doi:10.1080/00071005.1953.9972895. JSTOR 3118752. OCLC 5544359872.
