= Thomas Larcom =

British Army surveyor and administrator (1801–1879)

Sir Thomas Larcom PC FRS
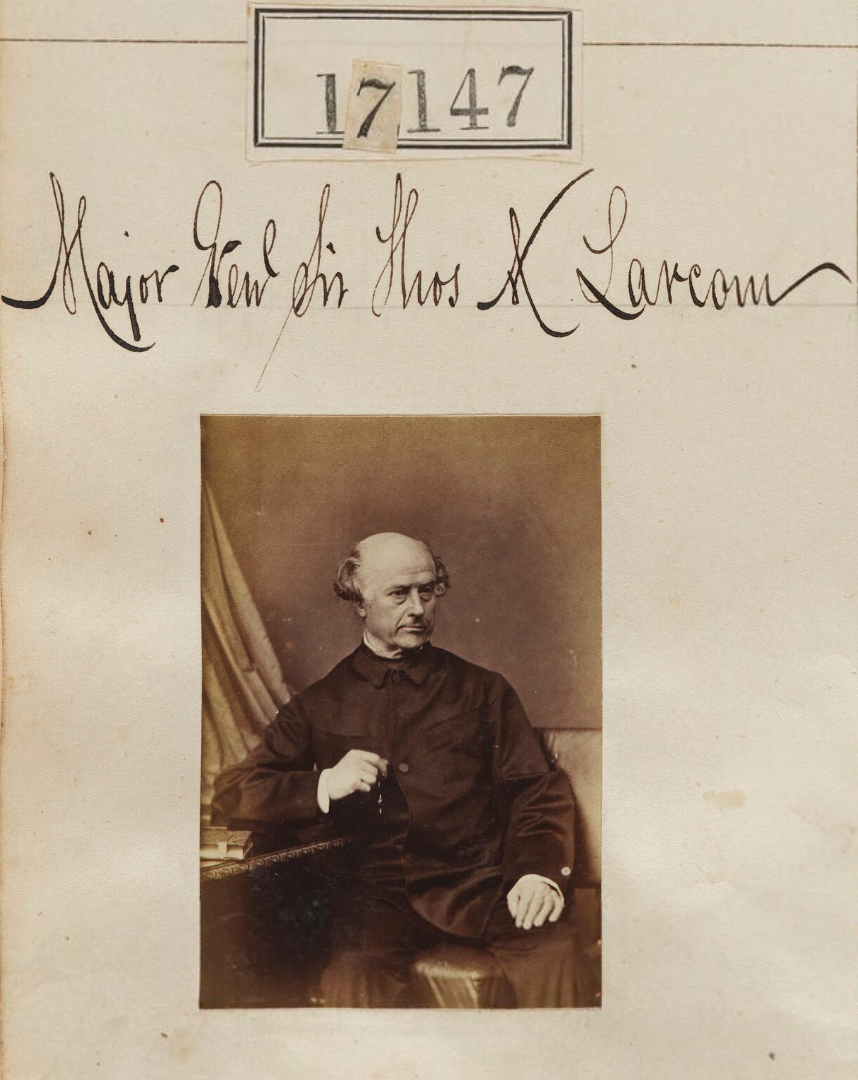

1st Baronet
- In office 1868–1879

Under-Secretary for Ireland
- In office 1853–1868

Personal details
- Born: 22 April 1801 Gosport, Hampshire
- Died: 15 June 1879 (aged 78) Hampshire
- Spouse: Georgina D'Aguilar
- Children: 5

Major-General Sir Thomas Aiskew Larcom, Bart (22 April 1801 – 15 June 1879) was a leading official in the early Irish Ordnance Survey. He later became a poor law commissioner, census commissioner and finally executive head of the British administration in Ireland as under-secretary to the Lord-Lieutenant of Ireland, a position the government of the day was eager for him to take.

Born in Gosport, Hampshire, Larcom received his education at the Royal Military Academy and was commissioned in the Royal Engineers in 1820. He began his career with the Ordnance Survey of England in 1824 before being transferred to Ireland. With the rank of lieutenant he led the day-to-day operations of Survey headquarters by 1828 under Lt-Colonel Thomas Colby and established a meteorological observatory in Dublin. At the completion of the Survey's six-inch maps in 1846, Larcom joined the Irish Board of Works. In this role he was involved in the establishment of the Queen's University of Ireland.

The longest-serving under-secretary (1853–1868), Larcom had a distinguished career in his adopted country and acted with an impartiality that won him respect from all parties. In 1868 he was admitted to the Irish Privy Council and created a baronet.

== Arms ==
Coat of arms of Thomas Larcom

Crest
On a cap of maintenance Azure turned up Ermine a martlet Sable with a fleur-de-lis in its beak Or.
Escutcheon
Argent on a mount a hawthorn bush Proper and in chief an eagle displayed Gules.
Motto
Le Roy La Loy

== Bibliography ==
- Thomas Colby (1837), Ordnance Survey of the County of Londonderry (Dublin)
- J.A. Lawson, "Manuscript life of Sir Thomas Larcom" (undated)
- Montagu Burrows (1892), "Larcom, Thomas Aiskew", Dictionary of National Biography, 1885-1900, vol. 32
- "A century of Irish Government", Edinburgh Review, no. 336 (1879)
- "Obituary memoir of Sir T. A. Larcom", Proceedings of the Royal Society, no. 198 (1879)
- Petty, William (1851). Larcom, Thomas Aiskew (ed.). The History of the Survey of Ireland commonly called The Down Survey by Doctor William Petty A.D. 1655–6 . Dublin: Irish Archaeological Society – via Wikisource.

== Footnotes ==
Government offices
Preceded by John Wynne	Under-Secretary for Ireland; 1853–1868	Succeeded by Sir Edward Robert Wetherall
Baronetage of the United Kingdom
New creation	Baronet; 1868–1879	Succeeded by Charles Larcom
