= William Petty =

English economist and philosopher (1623–1687)

Sir William Petty FRS
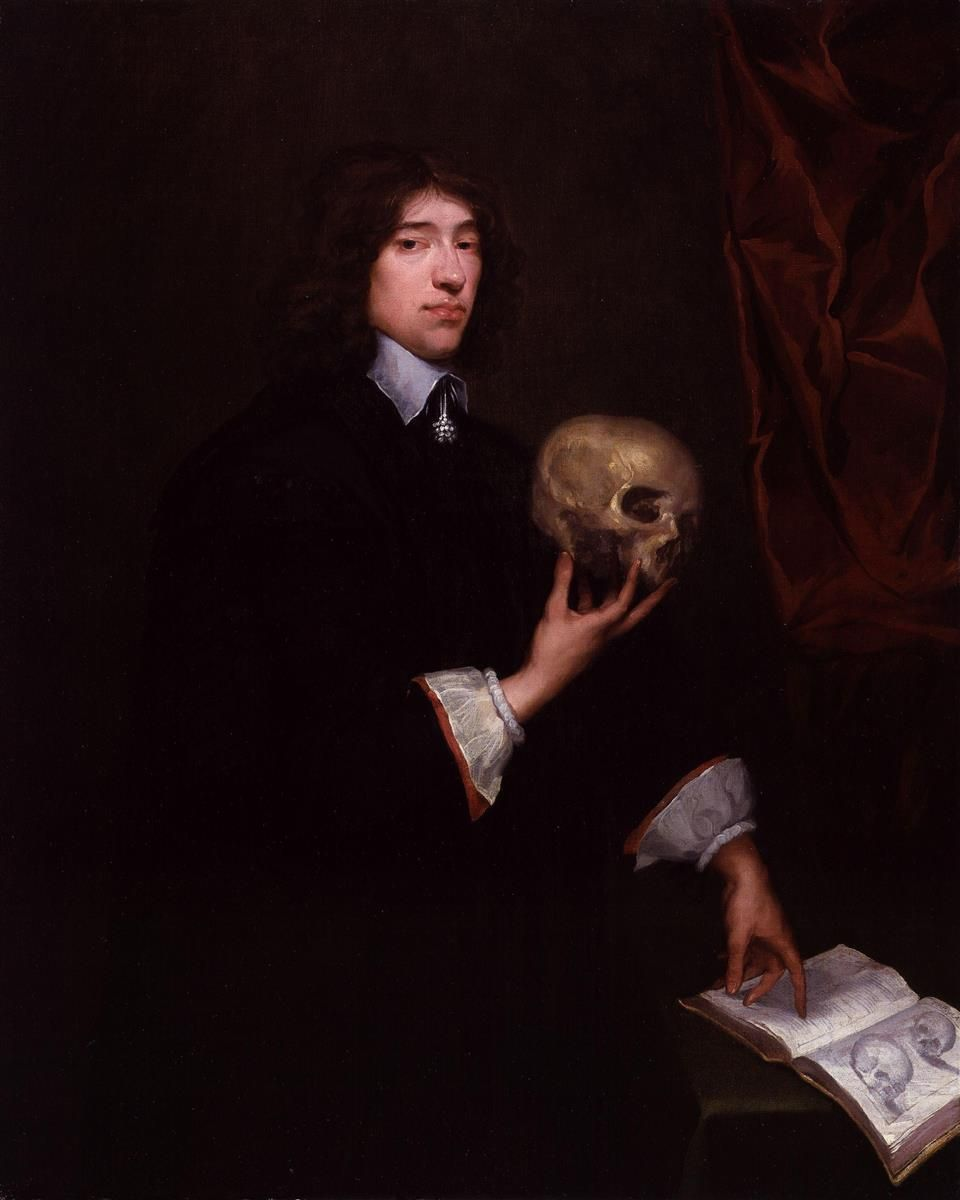
- c. 1650 portrait of Petty by Isaac Fuller
- Born: 26 May 1623; Romsey, Hampshire, England
- Died: 16 December 1687 (aged 64); London, England

Philosophical work
- Era: 17th-century philosophy (Modern philosophy)
- Region: Western philosophy
- School: Classical economics
- Main interests: Political philosophy, ethics, economics, medicine
- Notable ideas: Division of labour, fiscal theory, monetary theory, national income accounting, economic statistics, gross domestic product

Sir William Petty FRS (26 May 1623 – 16 December 1687) was an English economist, physician, scientist and philosopher. He first became prominent serving Oliver Cromwell and the Commonwealth in Ireland. He developed efficient methods to survey the land that was to be confiscated and given to Cromwell's soldiers. He also remained a significant figure under King Charles II and King James II, as did many others who had served Cromwell. Petty was also a scientist, inventor, and merchant, a charter member of the Royal Society, and briefly a member of the Parliament of England. However, he is best remembered for his theories on economics and his methods of political arithmetic. He was knighted in 1661.

== Life ==
=== Early life ===
Petty was born in Romsey, where his father and grandfather were clothiers. He was a precocious and intelligent youth and in 1637 became a cabin boy. His readiness to provide caricatures of fellow crew members won him few friends. He also learnt of his defective sight when he failed to spot a landmark he had been told to look for. The captain, who had by this time seen the landmark from the deck for himself "drubbed him with a cord". He was subsequently set ashore in Normandy after breaking his leg on board. After this setback, he applied in Latin to study with the Jesuits in Caen, supporting himself by teaching English. After a year, he returned to England, and had by now a thorough knowledge of Latin, Greek, French, mathematics, and astronomy.

=== At Oxford ===
After the Third Siege of Oxford had resulted in the garrison surrendering to the parliamentarians on 24 June 1646, Petty arrived in the town and was offered a fellowship at Brasenose College and studied medicine at the University. He befriended Hartlib and Boyle and became a member of the Oxford Philosophical Club.

==== Musician, doctor, academic and surveyor ====
By 1651, Petty was an anatomy instructor at Brasenose College, Oxford, as deputy to Thomas Clayton the younger. With a second doctor, Thomas Willis, Petty was involved in treating Anne Greene, a woman who survived her own hanging and was subsequently pardoned because her survival was widely held to be an act of divine intervention. The event was widely written about at the time, and helped to build Petty's career and reputation. He was also appointed Gresham Professor of Music by the Corporation of the City of London in 1650, retaining the post until 1660.

In 1652, he took a leave of absence and travelled with Oliver Cromwell's army in Ireland as physician-general, responsible to Cromwell's son-in-law, Charles Fleetwood. His opposition to conventional universities, being committed to 'new science' as inspired by Francis Bacon and imparted by his afore-mentioned acquaintances, perhaps pushed him from Oxford. He was pulled to Ireland perhaps by a sense of ambition and desire for wealth and power. He secured the contract for charting Ireland in 1654, so that those who had lent funds to Cromwell's army might be repaid in land – a means of ensuring the army was self-financing. This enormous task, which he completed in 1656, became known as the Down Survey, later published (1685) as Hiberniae Delineatio. As his reward, he acquired approximately 30,000 acres (120 km^{2}) in Kenmare, in southwest Ireland, and £9,000. This personal gain to Petty led to persistent court cases on charges of bribery and breach of trust, until his death.

Back in England, as a Cromwellian supporter, he ran successfully for Parliament in 1659 for West Looe.

==== Projector ====
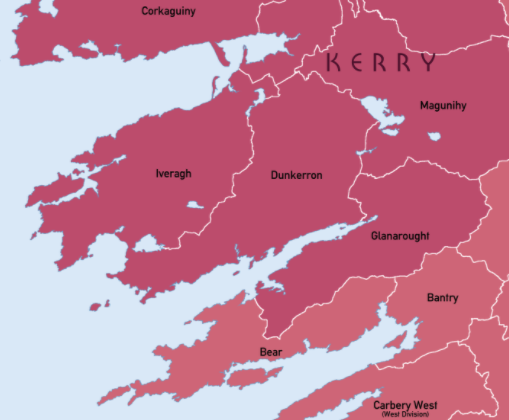
Petty's baronetcies in Kerry

Petty gained possession of the three baronies of Iveragh, Glanarought and Dunkerron in County Kerry. He soon became a projector, developing extensive plans for an ironworks and a fishery on his substantial estates in Kerry. Although he had great expectations of his application of his scientific methods to improvement, little came of these. He began by applying his political arithmetic to his own estates, surveying the population and livestock to develop an understanding of the land's potential. The ironworks was established in 1660.

==== Natural philosopher ====
Despite his political allegiances, Petty was well-treated at the Restoration in 1660, although he lost some of his Irish lands. Charles II, at their first meeting, brushed aside Petty's apologies for his past support for Cromwell, "seeming to regard them as needless", and discussed his experiments into the mechanics of shipping instead.

In 1661 he was elected as a Member of Parliament for Inistioge in the Parliament of Ireland. In 1662, he was admitted as a charter member of the Royal Society of the same year. This year also saw him write his first work on economics, Treatise of Taxes and Contributions. Petty counted naval architecture among his many scientific interests. He had become convinced of the superiority of double-hulled boats, although they were not always successful; a ship called the Experiment reached Porto in 1664, but sank on the way back.

=== Ireland and later life ===
Petty was knighted in 1661 by Charles II and served as MP for Inistioge from 1661 to 1666. He remained in Ireland until 1685. He was a friend of Samuel Pepys.

The events that took him from Oxford to Ireland marked a shift from medicine and the physical sciences to the social sciences, and Petty lost all his Oxford offices. The social sciences became the area that he studied for the rest of his life. His focus became greater income from Irish colonization, and his works describe that country and propose many remedies for what he characterized as its backward condition. He helped found the Dublin Society in 1682. Returning ultimately to London in 1685, he died in 1687. He was buried in Romsey Abbey.

== Family ==
William Petty married Elizabeth Waller in 1667. She was a daughter of the regicide Sir Hardress Waller (whose life was spared after the Restoration) and Elizabeth Dowdall. She had been previously married to Sir Maurice Fenton, who died in 1664. She was given the title Baroness Shelburne for life. They had three surviving children:

- Charles Petty, 1st Baron Shelburne
- Henry Petty, 1st Earl of Shelburne
- Anne, who married Thomas Fitzmaurice, 1st Earl of Kerry.

Neither Charles nor Henry had male issue and the Shelburne title passed by a special remainder to Anne's son John Petty, 1st Earl of Shelburne, who took his mother's surname, and whose descendants hold the title Marquis of Lansdowne. Her grandson William Petty, 2nd Earl of Shelburne, praised her as a woman of strong character and intelligence, the only person who could manage her bad-tempered and tyrannical husband.

== Economic works and theories ==
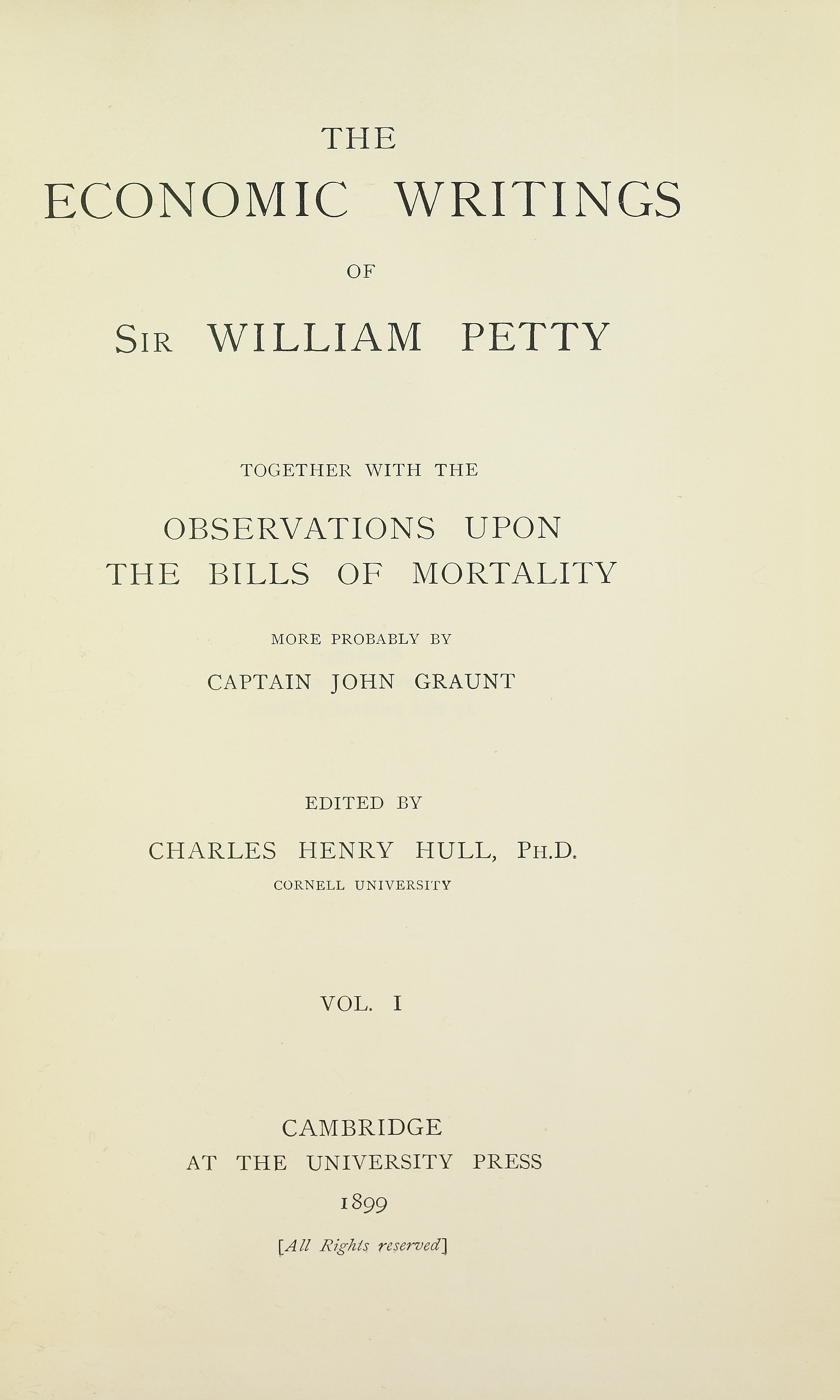
The Economic Writings, 1899

Two men crucially influenced Petty's economic theories. The first was Thomas Hobbes, for whom Petty acted as personal secretary. According to Hobbes, theory should set out the rational requirements for "civil peace and material plenty". As Hobbes had centred on peace, Petty chose prosperity.

The influence of Francis Bacon was also profound. Bacon, and indeed Hobbes, held the conviction that mathematics and the senses must be the basis of all rational sciences. This passion for accuracy led Petty to famously declare that his form of science would only use measurable phenomena and would seek quantitative precision, rather than rely on comparatives or superlatives, yielding a new subject that he named "political arithmetic". Petty thus carved a niche for himself as the first dedicated economic scientist, amidst the merchant-pamphleteers, such as Thomas Mun or Josiah Child, and philosopher-scientists occasionally discussing economics, such as John Locke.

He was indeed writing before the true development of political economy. As such, many of his claims for precision are of imperfect quality. Nonetheless, Petty wrote three main works on economics, Treatise of Taxes and Contributions (written in 1662), Verbum Sapienti (1665) and Quantulumcunque Concerning Money (1682). These works, which received great attention in the 1690s, show his theories on major areas of what would later become economics. What follows is an analysis of his most important theories, those on fiscal contributions, national wealth, the money supply and circulation velocity, value, the interest rate, international trade and government investment.

Many of his economic writings were collected by Charles Henry Hull in 1899 in The Economic Writings of Sir William Petty.

Hull, in his scholarly article 'Petty's Place in the History of Economic Theory' (1900) proposed a division of the economic writings of Petty in three (or four) groups:

- the first group, written when Petty had returned to London after finishing his "Down Survey" in Ireland, consists mainly of A Treatise of Taxes & Contributions (written and first published 1662) and Verbum Sapienti (written 1665, printed 1691). These texts relate to the discussions about fiscal issues, following the Restoration and the expenses of the first Dutch war.
- the second group holds The Political Anatomy of Ireland and Political Arithmetick. These texts were written some ten years later in Ireland. As Hull writes, the "direct impulse to their writing came from Dr. Edward Chamberlayne's Present State of England, published 1669".
- Again ten years later the third group of pamphlets was written, that were contributions to the dispute whether London was a larger city than Paris, and that are titled the Essays in Political Arithmetick by Hull. This group of pamphlets had a close relation to John Graunt's Observations upon the Bills of Mortality of London.
- The Quantulumcunque concerning Money (written in 1682, and printed in 1695, and perhaps in 1682), can probably be considered as belonging to a group of its own.

The division given here was still used by scholars at the end of the twentieth century.

=== Fiscal contributions ===
By Petty's time, England was engaged in war with Holland, and in the first three chapters of Treatise of Taxes and Contributions, Petty sought to establish principles of taxation and public expenditure, to which the monarch could adhere, when deciding how to raise money for the war. Petty lists six kinds of public charge, namely defence, governance, the pastorage of men's souls, education, the maintenance of impotents of all sorts and infrastructure, or things of universal good. He then discusses general and particular causes of changes in these charges. He thinks that there is great scope for reduction of the first four public charges, and recommends increased spending on care for the elderly, sick, orphans, etc., as well as the government employment of supernumeraries.

Petty was interested in the extent to which taxes could be raised without inciting rebellion On the issue of raising taxes, Petty was a definite proponent of consumption taxes. He recommended that in general taxes should be just sufficient to meet the various types of public charges that he listed. They should also be horizontally equitable, regular and proportionate. He condemned poll taxes as very unequal and excise on beer as taxing the poor excessively. He recommended a much higher quality of statistical information, to raise taxes more fairly. Imports should be taxed, but only in such a way that would put them on a level playing field with domestic produce. A vital aspect of economies at this time was that they were transforming from barter economies to money economies. Linked to this, and aware of the scarcity of money, Petty recommends that taxes be payable in forms other than gold or silver, which he estimated to be less than 1% of national wealth. To him, too much importance was placed on money, "which is to the whole effect of the Kingdom… not [even] one to 100".

=== National income accounting ===
In making the above estimate, Petty introduced in the first two chapters of Verbum Sapienti the first rigorous assessments of national income and wealth. To him, it was all too obvious that a country's wealth lay in more than just gold and silver. He worked off an estimation that the average personal income was £6 13s 4d per annum, with a population of six million, meaning that national income would be £40m. Petty's theory produced estimates, some more reliable than others, for the various components of national income, including land, ships, personal estates and housing. He then distinguished between the stocks (£250m) and the flows yielding from them (£15m). The discrepancy between these flows and his estimate for national income (£40m) leads Petty to postulate that the other £25m is the yield from what must be £417m of labour stock, the "value of the people". This gave a total wealth for England in the 1660s of £667m.

=== Statistics ===
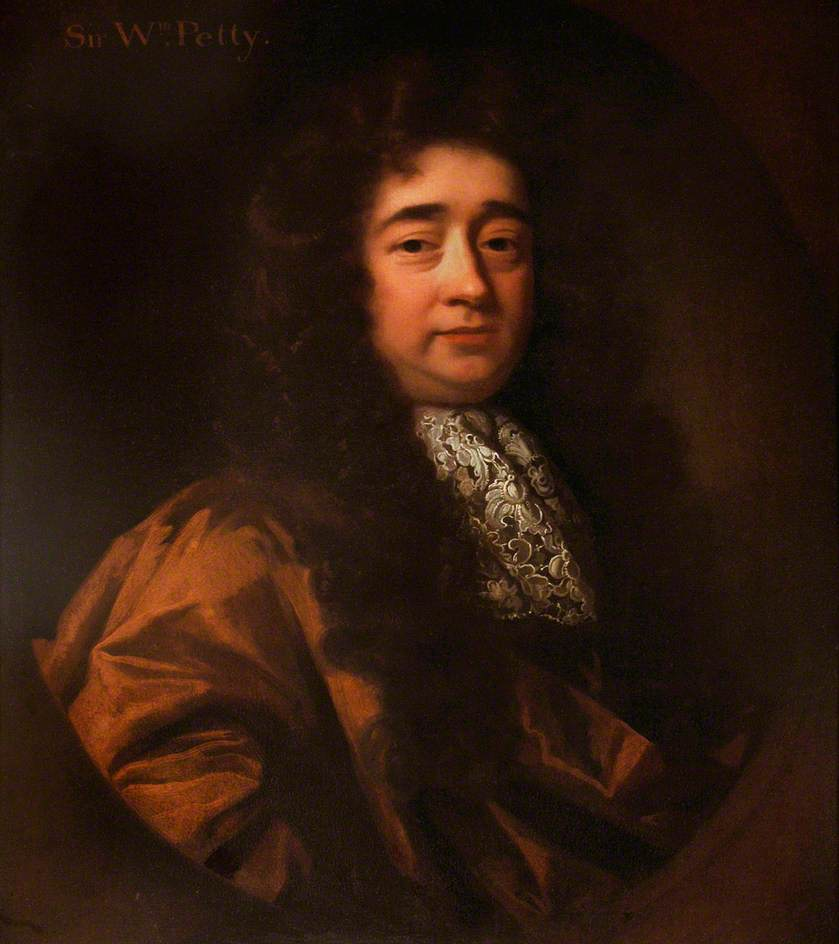
Portrait of Petty attributed to Sir Godfrey Kneller

Petty's only statistical technique is the use of simple averages. He would not be a statistician by today's standards but during his time a statistician was merely one that employed the use of quantitative data. Because obtaining census data was difficult, if not impossible, especially for Ireland, he applied methods of estimation. The way in which he would estimate the population would be to start with estimating the population of London. He would do this by either estimating it by exports or by deaths. His method of using exports is by considering that a 30 per cent increase in exports corresponds to a similar proportionate increase in population. The way he would use deaths would be by multiplying the number of deaths by 30 – estimating that one out of thirty people dies each year. To obtain the population of all of England he would multiply the population of London by 8. Such a simple use of estimation could have easily have been abused and Petty was accused more than once of doctoring the figures for the Crown. (Henry Spiegel)

=== Money supply and circulation ===
This figure for the stock of wealth was contrasted with a money supply in gold and silver of only £6m. Petty believed that there was a certain amount of money that a nation needed to drive its trade. Hence it was possible to have too little money circulating in an economy, which would mean that people would have to rely on barter. It would also be possible for there to be too much money in an economy. But the topical question was, as he asks in chapter 3 of Verbum Sapienti, would £6m be enough to drive a nation's trade, especially if the King wanted to raise additional funds for the war with Holland?

The answer for Petty lay in the velocity of money's circulation. Anticipating the quantity theory of money often said to be initiated by John Locke, whereby economic output (Y) times price level (p) = money supply (MS) times velocity of circulation (v), Petty stated that if economic output was to be increased for a given money supply and price level, 'revolutions' must occur in smaller circles (i.e. velocity of circulation must be higher). This could be done through the establishment of a bank. He explicitly stated in Verbum Sapienti "nor is money wanting to answer all the ends of a well-policed state, notwithstanding the great decreases thereof which have happened within these Twenty years" and that higher velocity is the answer. He also mentions that there is nothing unique about gold and silver in fulfilling the functions of money and that money is the means to an end, not the end itself:

Nor were it hard to substitute in the place of Money [gold and silver] (were a comptency of it wanting) what should be equivalent unto it. For Money is but the Fat of the Body-Politick, whereof too much doth often hinder its agility, as too little makes it sick... so doth Money in the State quicken its Action, feeds from abroad in the time of Dearth at home.'

What is striking about these passages is his intellectual rigour, which put him far ahead of the mercantilist writers of earlier in the century. The use of biological analogies to illustrate his point, a trend continued by the physiocrats in France early in the 18th century, was also unusual.

=== Theory of value ===
On value, Petty continued the debate begun by Aristotle, and chose to develop an input-based theory of value: "all things ought to be valued by two natural Denominations, which is Land and Labour" (p. 44). Both of these would be prime sources of taxable income. Like Richard Cantillon after him, he sought to devise some equation or par between the "mother and father" of output, land and labour, and to express value accordingly. He still included general productivity, one's "art and industry". He applied his theory of value to rent. The natural rent of a land was the excess of what a labourer produces on it in a year over what he ate himself and traded for necessities. It was therefore the profit above the various costs related to the factors involved in production.

=== Interest rate ===
The natural rate of rent is related to his theories on usury. At the time, many religious writers still condemned the charging of interest as sinful. Petty also involved himself in the debate on usury and interest rates, regarding the phenomenon as a reward for forbearance on the part of the lender. Incorporating his theories of value, he asserted that, with perfect security, the rate of interest should equal the rent for land that the principal could have bought – again, a precocious insight into what would later become general equilibrium findings. Where security was more "casual", the return should be greater – a return for risk. Having established the justification for usury itself, that of forbearance, he then shows his Hobbesian qualities, arguing against any government regulation of the interest rate, pointing to the "vanity and fruitlessness of making civil positive laws against the laws of nature".

=== Laissez-faire governance ===
This is one of the major themes of Petty's writings, summed up by his use of the phrase vadere sicut vult, from which laissez-faire is derived. As mentioned earlier, the motif of medicine was also useful to Petty, and he warned against over-interference by the government in the economy, seeing it as analogous to a physician tampering excessively with his patient. He applied this to monopolies, controls on the exportation of money and on the trade of commodities. They were, to him, vain and harmful to a nation. He recognised the price effects of monopolies, citing the French king's salt monopoly as an example. In another work, Political Arithmetic, Petty also recognised the importance of economies of scale. He described the phenomenon of the division of labour, asserting that a good is both of better quality and cheaper, if many work on it. Petty said that the gain is greater "as the manufacture itself is greater".

=== Foreign exchange and control of trade ===
On the efflux of specie, Petty thought it vain to try to control it, and dangerous, as it would leave the merchants to decide what goods a nation buys with the smaller amount of money. He noted in Quantulumcunque concerning money that countries plentiful in gold have no such laws restricting specie. On exports in general, he regarded prescriptions, such as recent Acts of Parliament forbidding the export of wool and yarn, as "burthensome". Further restrictions "would do us twice as much harm as the losse of our said Trade" (p. 59), albeit with a concession that he is no expert in the study of the wool trade.

On prohibiting imports, for example from Holland, such restrictions did little other than drive up prices, and were only useful if imports vastly exceeded exports. Petty saw far more use in going to Holland and learning whatever skills they have than trying to resist nature. Epitomizing his viewpoint, he thought it preferable to sell cloth for "debauching" foreign wines, rather than leave the clothiers unemployed.

=== Division of labour ===
In his Political Arithmetick, Petty made a practical study of the division of labour, showing its existence and usefulness in Dutch shipyards. Classically the workers in a shipyard would build ships as units, finishing one before starting another. But the Dutch had it organised with several teams each doing the same tasks for successive ships. People with a particular task to do must have discovered new methods that were only later observed and justified by writers on political economy.

Petty also applied the principle to his survey of Ireland. His breakthrough was to divide up the work so that large parts of it could be done by people with no extensive training.

=== Urban society ===
Petty projected the growth of the city of London and supposed that it might swallow the rest of England – not so far from what actually happened:

Now, if the city double its people in 40 years, and the present number be 670,000, and if the whole territory be 7,400,000, and double in 360 years, as aforesaid, then by the underwritten table it appears that A.D. 1840 the people of the city will be 10,718,880, and those of the whole country but 10,917,389, which is but inconsiderably more. Wherefore it is certain and necessary that the growth of the city must stop before the said year 1840, and will be at its utmost height in the next preceding period, A.D. 1800, when the number of the city will be eight times its present number, 5,359,000. And when (besides the said number) there will be 4,466,000 to perform the tillage, pasturage, and other rural works necessary to be done without the said city.

He imagined a future in which "the city of London is seven times bigger than now, and that the inhabitants of it are 4,690,000 people, and that in all the other cities, ports, towns, and villages, there are but 2,710,000 more". He expected this some time around 1800, extrapolating existing trends. Long before Malthus, he noticed the potential of the human population to increase. But he also saw no reason why such a society should not be prosperous.

== Legacy ==
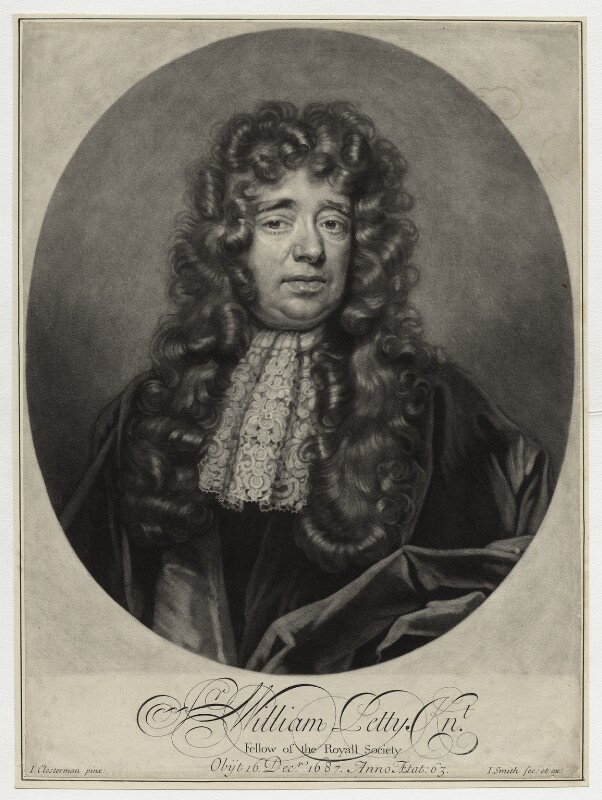
Mezzotint of Petty by John Smith after a John Closterman portrait

William Petty is best remembered for his economic history and statistical writings, preceding the work of Adam Smith, and for being a founding member of the Royal Society. Of particular interest were his forays into statistical analysis. Petty's work in political arithmetic, along with the work of John Graunt, laid the foundation for modern census techniques. This work in statistical analysis, when further expanded by writers like Josiah Child documented some of the first expositions of modern insurance. Vernon Louis Parrington notes him as an early expositor of the labour theory of value as discussed in Treatise of Taxes in 1692.

He influenced several future economists, including Richard Cantillon, Adam Smith, Karl Marx, and John Maynard Keynes. Petty and Adam Smith shared a worldview that believed in a harmonious natural world. They both saw the benefits of specialisation and the division of labour. Smith said nothing about Petty in The Wealth of Nations. In his published writings, there is nothing apart from a reference in a letter to Lord Shelburne, one of Petty's aristocratic descendants.

Karl Marx imitated Petty's belief that the total effort put in by the aggregate of ordinary workers represented a far greater contribution to the economy than contemporary ideas recognised. This belief led Petty to conclude that labour ranked as the greatest source of wealth. By contrast, Marx's conclusions were that surplus labour was the source of all profit, and that the labourer was alienated from his surplus and thus from society. Marx's high esteem of Adam Smith is mirrored in his consideration of Petty's analysis, testified for by countless quotations in his major work Das Kapital. John Maynard Keynes demonstrated how governments could manage aggregate demand to stimulate output and employment, much as Petty had done with simpler examples in the 17th century. Petty's simple £100-through-100-hands multiplier was refined by Keynes and incorporated into his model.

Some consider Petty's achievements a matter of good fortune. Petty was a music professor before being apprenticed to the brilliant Thomas Hobbes. He arrived upon his laissez-faire view of economics at a time of great opportunity and growth in the expanding British Empire. Laissez-faire policies stood in direct contrast to his supervisor Hobbes's Social Contract, developed from Hobbes's experiences during the greatest depression in England's history, the General Crisis.

=== Monument ===
In 1858 Henry Petty-Fitzmaurice, 3rd Marquess of Lansdowne, one of Petty's descendants, erected a memorial and likeness of Petty in Romsey Abbey. The text on it reads: "A true patriot and a sound philosopher who, by his powerful intellect, his scientific works and indefatigable industry, became a benefactor to his family and an ornament to his country". A monumental slab on the floor of the south choir aisle of the Abbey reads "HERE LAYES SIR WILLIAM PETY". The third Marquess also erected the Lansdowne Monument on Cherhill Down in Wiltshire.

== Publications ==
- 1647: The Advice to Hartlib
- 1648: A Declaration Concerning the newly invented Art of Double Writing
- 1659: Proceedings between Sankey and Petty
- 1660: Reflections upon Ireland
- 1662: A Treatise of Taxes & Contributions (later editions: 1667, 1679, 1685, etc.)
- Political Arithmetic posthum. (approx. 1676, pub. 1690)
- Verbum Sapienti posthum. (1664, pub. 1691)
- Political Anatomy of Ireland posthum. (1672, pub. 1691)
- Quantulumcunque Concerning Money ("something, be it ever so small, about money") posthum. (1682, pub. 1695)
- An Essay Concerning the Multiplication of Mankind. (1682)

== Sources ==
- Komel, Svit (January 2024). "Petty's instruments: the Down Survey, territorial natural history and the birth of statistics". The British Journal for the History of Science. 57 (1): 43–64. doi:10.1017/S0007087423001097.
- Aspromourgos, Tony (1988) "The life of William Petty in relation to his economics" in History of Political Economy 20: 337–356.
- Burke, John; Burke, Sir Bernard (1844). "Fenton of Mitchelstown". A Genealogical and Heraldic History of the Extinct and Dormant Baronetcies of England, Ireland and Scotland (2 ed.). J. R. Smith. p. 605.
- Eli F. Heckscher (2013) [1935]. Mercantilism. Vol. 1. Taylor & Francis. ISBN 978-1-136-15738-7.
- Hutchison, Terence (1988). Before Adam Smith : The Emergence of Political Economy, 1662-1776. Oxford / New York: Basil Blackwell. ISBN 0-631-15898-7.
- Hull, Charles Henry, ed. (1899). The Economic Writings of Sir William Petty; together with the Observations upon the Bills of Mortality, more probably by Captain John Graunt . Cambridge: Cambridge University Press. OL 4007495W. OCLC 803827975 – via Wikisource.
- Hutchison, Terence (1988). "Petty on Policy, Theory and Method," in Before Adam Smith: the Emergence of Political Economy 1662–1776. Basil Blackwell.
- William Letwin (2013) [1963]. The Origins of Scientific Economics. Routledge. ISBN 978-1-136-50864-6.
- McCormick, Ted (2009). William Petty And the Ambitions of Political Arithmetic. Oxford University Press. ISBN 978-0-19-954789-0.
- Routh, Guy (1989) The Origin of Economic Ideas. London: Macmillan.
- Joseph A. Schumpeter (2006) [1954]. History of Economic Analysis. Routledge. ISBN 978-1-134-83870-7.
- Strathern, Paul (2001) - Dr Strangelove's Game : a brief history of economic genius. London : Hamish Hamilton.
- Yang, Hong-Seok (1994). The Political Economy of Trade and Growth: An Analytical Interpretation of Sir James Steuart's Inquiry. Edward Elgar. ISBN 9781782543619. (especially section 'Petty's Natural Price', pp. 61–68)
