= The Economic Writings of Sir William Petty =

17th century book with texts by William Petty

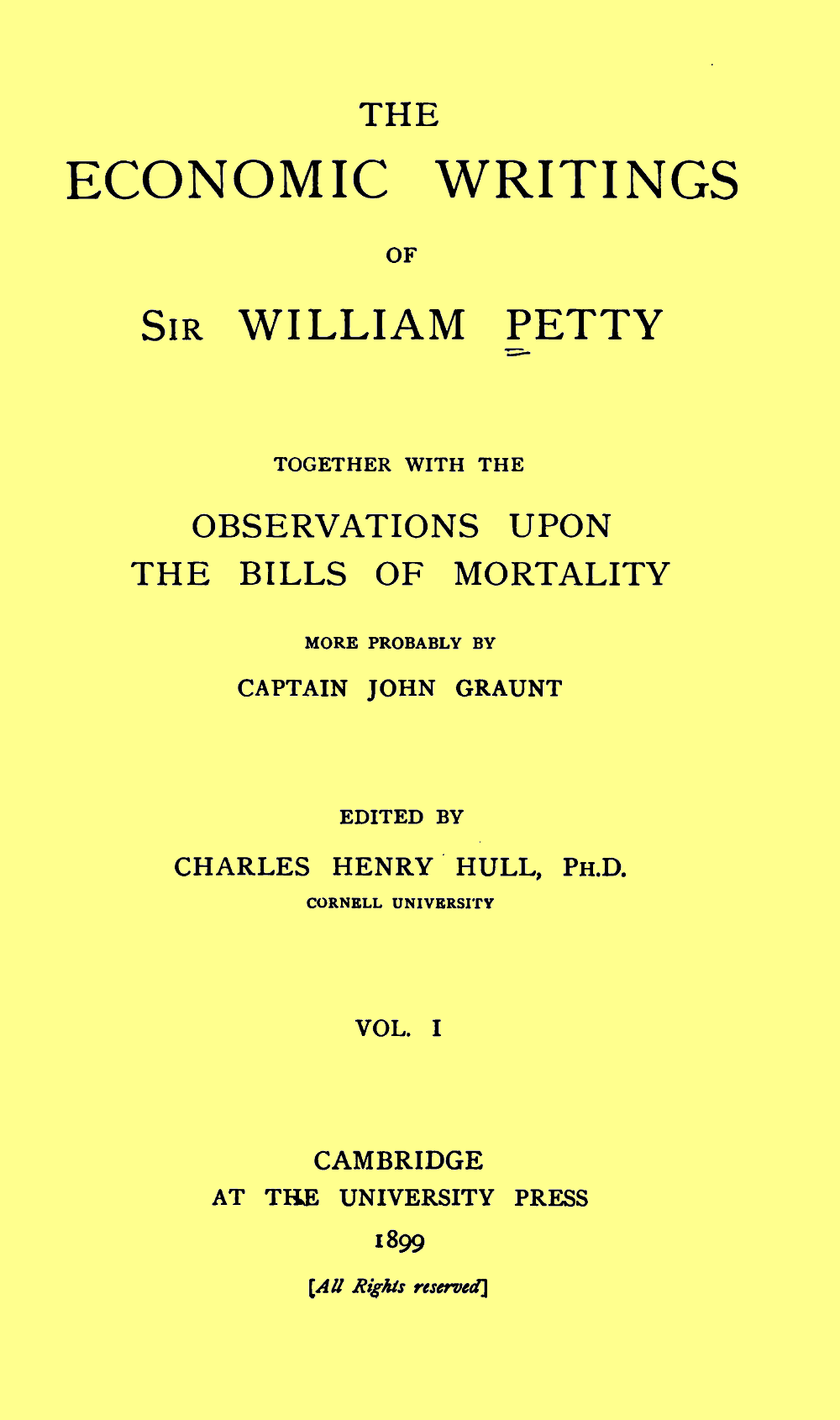
- Editor: Charles Henry Hull
- Author: William Petty
- Language: English
- Genre: collected works
- Publisher: Cambridge University Press
- Publication date: 1899
- Publication place: United Kingdom
- Pages: 411+412
- OCLC: 803827975
- Text: The Economic Writings of Sir William Petty at Wikisource

The Economic Writings of Sir William Petty is a book with texts, written by William Petty (1623-1687), and published in 1899 by Charles Henry Hull (1864-1936), in two volumes. The Economic Writings were published together with an introduction about the life and work of William Petty, and did also contain Natural and Political Observations upon the Bills of Mortality, by John Graunt.

This edition of the economic texts of William Petty, the scientist, who is often been called the founder of political economy, is used as a reference work ever since its publication.

Apart from the extensive collection of written publications by William Petty (and John Graunt), the general introduction to the life and work of Petty and Graunt, and the short introductions to the separate texts, it also contained the first extensive bibliography of the writings of Petty and Graunt.

== Bibliographical information ==
Petty, William (1899). Hull, Charles Henry (ed.). The Economic Writings of Sir William Petty; together with the Observations upon the Bills of Mortality, more probably by Captain John Graunt . Cambridge: Cambridge University Press. OL 4007495W. OCLC 803827975 – via Wikisource. in 2 vols. (411 + 412 pgs.)

The book has been reprinted several times, for instance in 1963/4, in 1986 and in the "Collected Works" of 1997.

== Volume 1 ==
Vol. 1 contains:

- 'Introduction' (by Charles Henry Hull), ca. 80 pgs.)
- A Treatise of Taxes and Contributions (first published London, 1662).
- Verbum Sapienti (A word to the wise) (written 1665, first published London, 1691 as a supplement of The Political Anatomy of Ireland).
- The Political Anatomy of Ireland (written 1672, first published London, 1691).
- Political Arithmetic (written 1672-6, first published London, 1690).

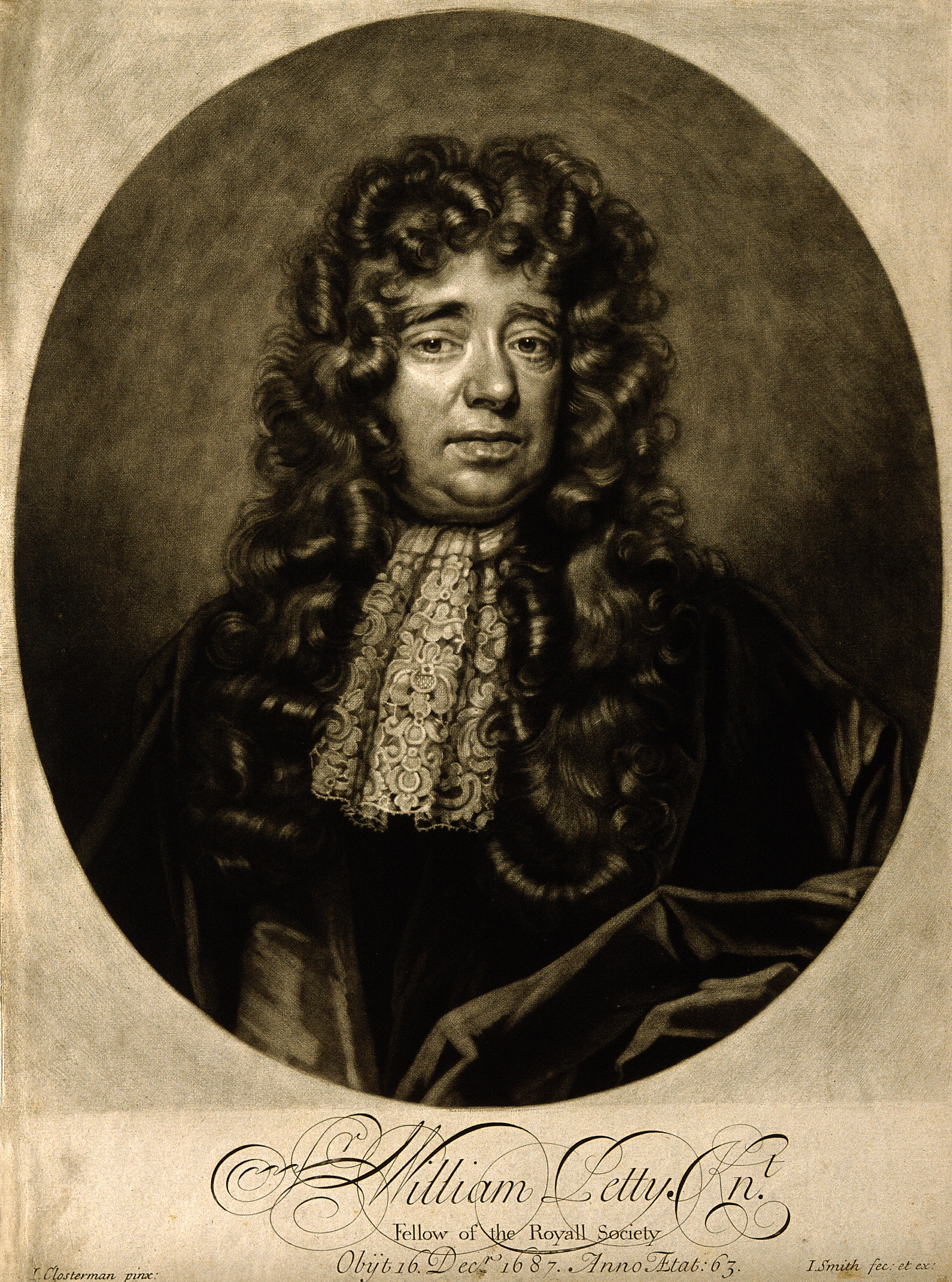
Sir William Petty. Mezzotint by J. Smith (1696), after J. Closterman

== Volume 2 ==
Vol. 2 of The Economic Writings of Sir William Petty contains:

- Natural and Political Observations upon the Bills of Mortality. By Capt. John Graunt. The text given is after the fifth edition (London, 1676).
- Sir William Petty's Quantulumcunque concerning Money. (written 1682, published London, 1695). (Quantulumcunque = ‘something, be it ever so small’)
- Another Essay in Political Arithmetick concerning the Growth of the City of London. (written 1682, published London, 1683).
- Observations upon the Dublin-Bills of Mortality, 1681, and the State of that City. (London, 1683).
- Further Observation upon the Dublin-Bills: or, Accompts of the Houses, Hearths, Baptisms, and Burials in that City. (London, 1686).
- Two Essays in Political Arithmetick, concerning the People, Housing, Hospitals, &c. of London and Paris. (London, 1687).
- Observations upon the Cities of London and Rome. (London, 1687).
- Five Essays in Political Arithmetick. (London, 1687).
- A Treatise of Ireland. (1687). This text had never been published before and was transcribed from a manuscript in the British Museum.
- Appendix.
- Bibliography of the Printed Writings of Sir William Petty.
- Supplement to the Bibliography of Petty's Works.
- Bibliography of the Natural and Political Observations.
- List of Books and Manuscripts used.
- Index.

== Introduction(s) by Charles Henry Hull ==
The book opens with an 'Introduction' by the editor, Charles Henry Hull, which gives biographic information on Petty and Graunt, and an extensive recapitulation of the debate concerning the authorship of the "Observations upon the Bills of Mortality".

The biography of Petty (p. xiii- xxxiii) is among many other sources, based on some early publications, like the Athenae Oxoniensis by Anthony Wood (published 1691), Petty's will, first published in the Tracts relating chiefly to Ireland (first published 1769), the Brief Lives of John Aubrey, on Petty's History of the Down Survey (published 1851 by Thomas Aiskew Larcom for the Irish Archaeological Society) and on the Life of Sir William Petty 1623 - 1687 by Lord Edmond Fitzmaurice (published 1895).

The second section of the 'Introduction' (p. xxxiv-xxxviii) gives a short biography of John Graunt, the author of the Observations upon the Bills of Mortality (first published 1662).

Hull spends quite some space on a detailed investigation of "the authorship of the Observations upon the Bills of Mortality". There are certain grounds for assigning the authorship of the Observations to William Petty. Some contemporaries of Petty have given rise to the idea that Petty was the author, like John Evelyn, John Aubrey, Edmund Halley and Bishop Gilbert Burnet. But there are also a number of contemporary testimonies in favour of Graunt. In the first place by Petty himself, in two letters to Sir Robert Southwell, but also by Sir Peter Pett. The final conclusion of Hull is that Graunt was definitely the author of the Observations.

After a short section on Petty's letters and other manuscripts, the 'Introduction' gives an overview of the whole body of economic writings of Petty.

The 'Introduction' finishes with two sections on Graunt and the (London) Bills of Mortality.

Most of the separate texts in the Economic Writings also have an introduction by Hull.

== About the economic writings of Petty ==
A year after the publication of The Economic Writings, in 1900, in an article in The Quarterly Journal of Economics entitled 'Petty's Place in the History of Economic Theory', Hull proposed a division of the economic writings of Petty in three 'chronological' groups:

- The two works of the early 1660s:
  - A Treatise of Taxes and Contributions (London, 1662); a number of editions of the Treatise appeared during Petty's life: 1662, 1667, 1679 and 1685. Although Petty later showed dissatisfaction with this work, “presumably because it did not bring him the influence and office he wanted, (...) the Treatise remains his most important (economic) work and deserves to be regarded as a major achievement and landmark in the history of economic thought.”
  - Verbum Sapienti (written 1665, published London, 1691)
- The two (statistical) works of the early 1670s:
  - The Political Anatomy of Ireland (written 1671-2, published London, 1690)
  - Political Arithmetic (written 1672-6, published London, 1690)
- Several works on population, including:
  - Essays in Political Arithmetic (1680s)
  - An Essay Concerning the Multiplication of Mankind (1682)

and finally the "pamphlet":

  - Quantulumcunque concerning Money (written 1682, published 1695).

== Critical reception ==
Soon after the publication of The Economic Writings a couple of reviews were written. James Laurence Laughlin published a short review in the Journal of Political Economy in 1899, in which he wrote that Hull's edition of Petty's writings "is done with an erudition, accuracy, intelligence, and thoroughness which leave nothing to be desired."

== Bibliography ==
Bevan, Wilson Lloyd (1894). "Sir William Petty: A Study in English Economic Literature" . Publication of the American Economic Association. IX (4): 1–102. OCLC 615596640 – via Wikisource.

- Blaug, Mark (1978). Economic theory in retrospect (Third ed.). Cambridge [etc.]: Cambridge University Press. ISBN 0-521-21733-4. 756 pgs. (first ed. 1962).
- Hull, Charles Henry (1896). "Graunt or Petty? The Authorship of the 'Observations upon the Bills of Mortality.'". Political Science Quarterly. XI (1): 105–132. (also reprinted as a separate publication; Boston : Ginn & Co. OCLC 797289663; online available in HathiTrust Digital Library.)
- —— (1900). "Petty's Place in the History of Economic Theory" . The Quarterly Journal of Economics. 14: 307–340. doi:10.2307/1882563. ISSN 0033-5533. JSTOR 1882563. OCLC 5545673036 – via Wikisource.
- Hutchison, Terence (1988). Before Adam Smith : The Emergence of Political Economy, 1662-1776. Oxford / New York: Basil Blackwell. ISBN 0-631-15898-7.
- Klant, J.J. (1988). Het ontstaan van de staathuishoudkunde (in Dutch). Leiden / Antwerpen: Stenfert Kroese bv, Wetenschappelijke en Educatieve Uitgevers. ISBN 90-207-1797-9.
- Kühnis, Sylva (1960). Die wert- und preistheoretischen Ideen William Pettys (in German). Winterthur: Verlag P.G. Keller. OCLC 244978509.
- Laughlin, J. Laurence (December 1899). "Review of 'The Economic Writings of Sir William Petty.'". Journal of Political Economy. 8 (1): 121–122. doi:10.1086/250643.
- O'Brien, D.P. (1975). The Classical Economists. Oxford: Clarendon Press. ISBN 0-19-877015-4.
- Roll, Eric (1973). A History of Economic Thought (4th (revised and enlarged; 1973; reprinted 1978) ed.). London & Boston: Faber & Faber Ltd. ISBN 0-571-04804-8.
- Strathern, Paul (2001). Dr Strangelove's Game : a brief history of economic genius. London: Hamish Hamilton. ISBN 9780676974485.
