= Petty's Place in the History of Economic Theory =

1900 journal article by Charles Henry Hull

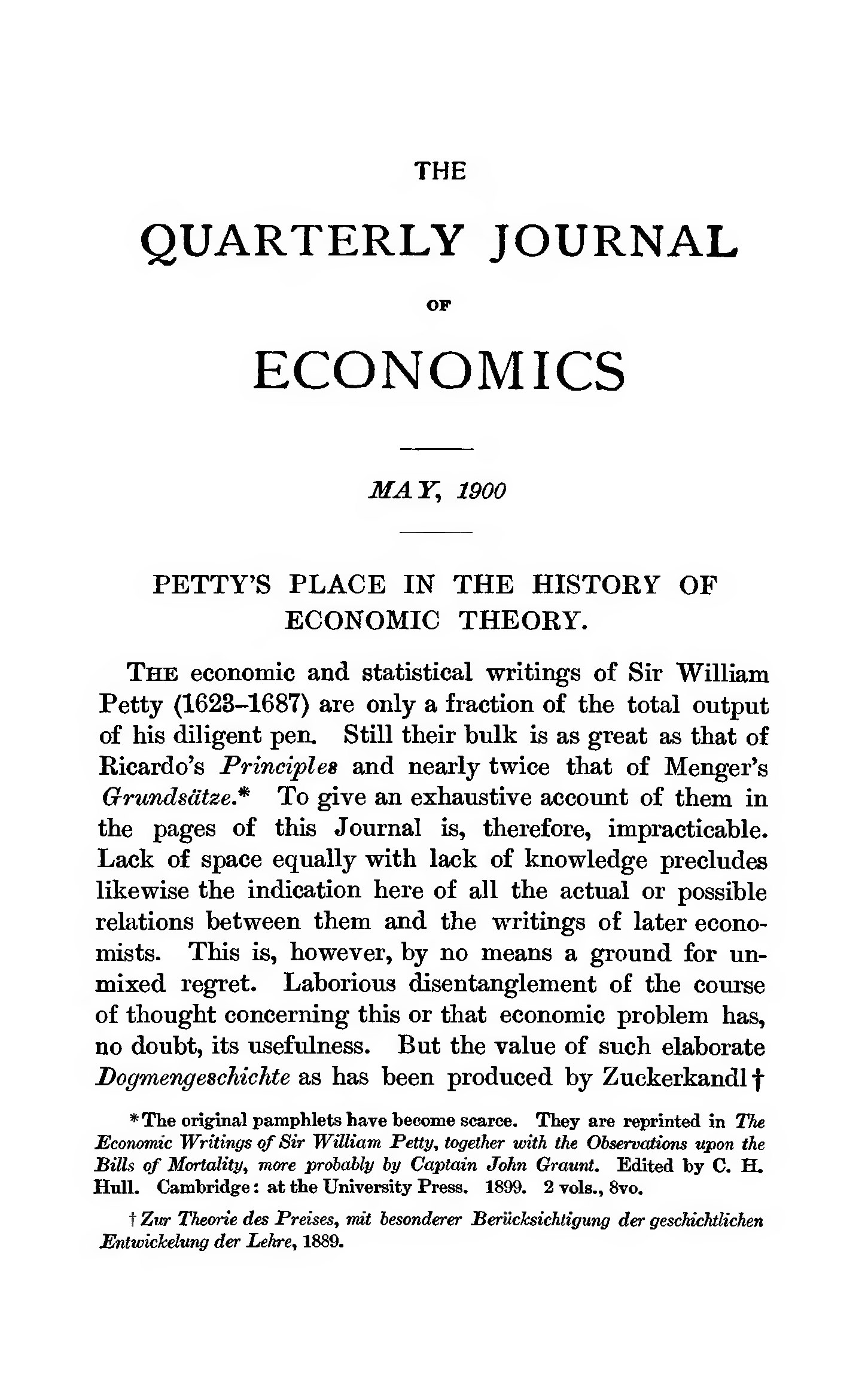
- Title page of Petty's Place 1900
- Author: Charles Henry Hull
- Language: English
- Subject: William Petty
- Publisher: The Quarterly Journal of Economics, vol. 14, no. 3
- Publication date: 1900
- Pages: 307-340
- OCLC: 5545673036
- Text: Petty's Place in the History of Economic Theory at Wikisource

"Petty's Place in the History of Economic Theory" is an academic article, written by Charles Henry Hull and published in The Quarterly Journal of Economics in 1900.

The article gives an overview of the life and work of William Petty, with a strong emphasis on the contribution of Petty to the development of early economic thinking. The article has reached some fame because Hull proposes in it the division of the writings of Petty into three chronological groups.

== Bibliographical information ==
Hull, Charles Henry (1900). "Petty's Place in the History of Economic Theory" . The Quarterly Journal of Economics. 14 (3): 307–340. doi:10.2307/1882563. ISSN 0033-5533. JSTOR 1882563. OCLC 5545673036 – via Wikisource.

The text was reprinted in Blaug 1991.

== Background ==
The contribution of William Petty to the early development of economic theory had already been a subject of research by different scholars. Hull mentions Zuckerkandl and von Bergmann in the introduction, and Ingram, Roscher, Kautz, McCulloch and Travers Twiss in the final chapter of 'Petty's Place in the History of Economic Theory'.

Hull himself had published The Economic Writings of Sir William Petty (in 2 volumes), in 1899, in which he had already written a large 'Introduction', containing biographic information on Petty (and Graunt), and in which he spend quite some space on the debate concerning the authorship of the Observations upon the Bills of Mortality, concluding that Graunt was the author of it.

Nowadays, Hull's article is often mentioned in the same breath with Wilson Lloyd Bevan's Sir William Petty: A Study in English Economic Literature, published a few years earlier, and demonstrating the revival of interest in Petty and his role in the development of (economic) thinking in the seventeenth century.

== Contents ==
After a short introductory paragraph, 'Petty's place in the history of economic theory' holds 5 chapters.

The first chapter contains a short biography of Petty, and a general description of the economic writings, in which Hull makes a division in three (or four) groups, relating to distinct periods in Petty's life, and to books with "a common provocation and common characteristics":

- the first group was written when Petty had returned to London after finishing his "Down Survey" in Ireland and consists mainly of A Treatise of Taxes & Contributions (written and first published 1662) and Verbum Sapienti (written 1665, printed 1691). Both texts relate to the discussions about fiscal issues, following the Restoration and the expenses in the first Dutch war.
- the second group contain The Political Anatomy of Ireland and Political Arithmetick. They were written some ten years later in Ireland. As Hull points out, the "direct impulse to their writing came from Dr. Edward Chamberlayne's Present State of England, published 1669".
- Again ten years later the group of pamphlets was written, that were contributions to the dispute whether London were a larger city than Paris, and that are titled the Essays in Political Arithmetick by Hull. This group of pamphlets has a close relation to John Graunt's Observations upon the Bills of Mortality of London.
- The Quantulumcunque concerning Money (written in 1682, and printed 1695, and perhaps in 1682), can probably be considered as belonging to a group of its own.

The division given here was still used by scholars at the end of the twentieth century.

The second chapter describes the method and content of the economic writings of Petty. Perhaps this chapter is biased because of Hull's interest in the use of the statistical method in history and economics. He mentions Petty's method a statistical method, which is as such inapplicable to many subjects, and therefore restricting to some extent the content of the writings. Petty's predilection for a statistical method is due to the influence of Bacon. The well-known quote of Petty is "The Method I take is not very usual; for, instead of using only comparative and superlative Words, and intellectual Arguments, I have taken the course (as a Specimen of the Political Arithmetick I have long aimed at) to express myself in Terms of Number, Weight, or Measure; to use only Arguments of Sense, and to consider only such Causes, as have visible Foundations in Nature".

But statistical sources were scarce in the 17th century. So a great number of basic facts, like the population of London, of England and of Ireland, had to be calculated, with all the risks of inaccuracies. And although he was aware of the fact that most of his calculations were mere guesses, he sometimes drew conclusions, that were far behind real. "He did not hesitate to advance, in all seriousness, the most astounding proposals for increasing the national wealth of the three kingdoms by a wholesale deportation of the Irish and Scotch into England,—proposals based solely upon the results of a complicated series of guesses and multiplications."

Chapter three is devoted to the content of Petty's work. As far as his contributions to economic theory are concerned, Hull thinks, that the writings in the first group (and the Quantulumcunque) are most important. This brings the focus to the Treatise of Taxes & Contributions, and thus on taxation. But out of the discussion of taxes also proceeds the treatment of rent. Also Petty's theory of value "is developed incidentally to the discussion of taxation. It is an uncompromising quantity-of-labor theory."

In the fourth chapter attention is first given to the second group of Petty's writings, the Political Anatomy of Ireland (1672) and the Political Arithmetick (1676). They are "predominantly descriptive" and economically, they add "little or nothing new to Petty's know ideas." The Political Arithmetick, in contrast to the Political Anatomy, deals chiefly with England, and especially tries to prove that England is stronger and wealthier than France. To prove this, Petty uses clever calculations.

In this same chapter Hull treats the third group of Petty's writings, the Essays in Political Arithmetick, together with the Quantulumcunque. The Essays had a public purpose: to prove that London "was a greater city than Paris, and, indeed, the greatest in the world. (…) The present interest of the Essays lies chiefly in the light which they throw upon Petty's statistical method. Economically, they are barren. The Quantulumcunque, on the other hand, is full of meat."

The final chapter tries to give a summary of the findings.

== Critical reception ==
The division of the writings of Petty into three groups, which was proposed by Hull in this article, was still referred to at the end of the twentieth century, for instance by Hutchison in 1988 and by Yang in 1994.

In 1955 Matsukawa criticized Hull, for not giving proper appraisal to some of the later essays of Petty. In Hull's opinion, these essays, generally regarded as his works on vital statistics, "added practically nothing of economic interest to these earlier books", while Matsukawa thinks they are "in final analysis his arguments for the increase of the 'Superlucration'."

Roll, in his A History of Economic Thought, is annoyed by Hull's characterization of Petty as "a sort of English cameralist". According to Roll, identifying Petty with the "pseudo-economist advisers of absolute monarchs" is based on "misconception" and "must seriously interfere with a just estimate of Petty's position in the history of economic thought."

In 1991 Mark Blaug published the first volume in the series on "Pioneers in Economics" on Pre-Classical Economists. This volume was dedicated to Charles Davenant (1656-1687) and William Petty. It contained ten scholarly articles, all previously published. The first article in the (chronologically ordered) volume was Petty's Place in the History of Economic Theory. In the short introduction to the volume Blaug did not further explain his choice of articles.

In 1993 Hong-Seok Yang referred to the classification of Petty's writings in chronological groups by Hull in his treatment of Petty's concept of 'natural price' in The political economy of trade and growth : an analytical interpretation of Sir James Steuart's Inquiry.

In 2002 Dooley referred to Hull 1900 as a "notable commentator" on Petty in the context of the early development of the labour theory of value.

In 2011 Erba, in an analysis of the contribution of Giammaria Ortes (1713-1790) to economic science, remarks that Ortes' calculations on income, consumption and distribution "are significantly more complete and accurate than those obtained by Petty". He cites Hull 1900 who says that no good grounds for Petty's assumptions can be found.

== Bibliography ==
- Bevan, Wilson Lloyd (1894). "Sir William Petty: A Study in English Economic Literature" . Publication of the American Economic Association. IX (4): 1–102. OCLC 615596640 – via Wikisource.
- Blaug, Mark, ed. (1991). Pre-Classical Economists; Volume 1. Aldershot: Edward Elgar Publishing. ISBN 978-1-85278-468-3. OCLC 991657150.
- Dooley, P.C. (2002). "The Labour Theory of Value: Economics or Ethics?". Discussion Paper, Dep. Of Economics, University of Saskatchewan. OCLC 71242912. (see also: this link; accessed 2019-03-20)
- Erba, Alighiero (2011). "Economic structure and national accounting: G. Ortes' contribution to economic science". History of Economic Ideas. 19 (1): 55–83. JSTOR 23723559.
- Granados, José A. Tapia (2005). "Economía y Mortalidad en las Ciencias Sociales: Del Renacimiento a las Ideas sobre la Transición Demográfica". Salud Colectiva (in Spanish). 1 (3): 285–308. doi:10.18294/sc.2005.48. OCLC 7180240395 (all editions).
- Hull, Charles Henry, ed. (1899). The Economic Writings of Sir William Petty; together with the Observations upon the Bills of Mortality, more probably by Captain John Graunt . Cambridge: Cambridge University Press. OL 4007495W. OCLC 803827975 – via Wikisource.
- Hutchison, Terence (1988). Before Adam Smith : The Emergence of Political Economy, 1662-1776. Oxford / New York: Basil Blackwell. ISBN 0-631-15898-7.
- Kühnis, Sylva (1960). Die wert- und preistheoretischen Ideen William Pettys (in German). Winterthur: Verlag P.G. Keller. OCLC 244978509.
- Matsukawa, Shichiro (1955). "Origin and Significance of Political Arithmetic" (PDF). The Annals of the Hitotsubashi Academy. 6 (October) (1): 53–79. doi:10.15057/11835. Archived from the original (PDF) on 2020-08-06.
- McCormick, Ted (2009). William Petty And the Ambitions of Political Arithmetic. Oxford etc.: Oxford University Press. ISBN 978-0-19-954789-0. OCLC 361888129. (Google Books)
- Roll, Eric (1973) [1st pub.: 1938]. A History of Economic Thought (revised and enlarged 1973; reprinted 1978, 4th. ed.). London & Boston: Faber & Faber Ltd. ISBN 0-571-04804-8.
- Roncaglia, Alessandro (1985). Petty. The Origins of Political Economy. Translated by Isabella Cherubini. Cardiff etc: University College Cardiff Press. ISBN 0-906449-91-X. (translation of Petty: la nascita dell' economia politica,1977)
- Reyes, Verónica Villarespe (2002). Pobreza: Teoría e Historia (PDF) (in Spanish). Mexico: Casa Juan Pablos. OCLC 1029896990.
- Yang, Hong-Seok (1994). The Political Economy of Trade and Growth: An Analytical Interpretation of Sir James Steuart's Inquiry. Edward Elgar. ISBN 9781782543619. OCLC 645239001 (all editions). (especially section 'Petty's Natural Price', p. 61 - 68; see also pdf of thesis 1993.)
