= The Life of Sir William Petty, 1623–1687 =

1895 book by Lord Edmond Fitzmaurice

The Life of Sir William Petty 1623–1687
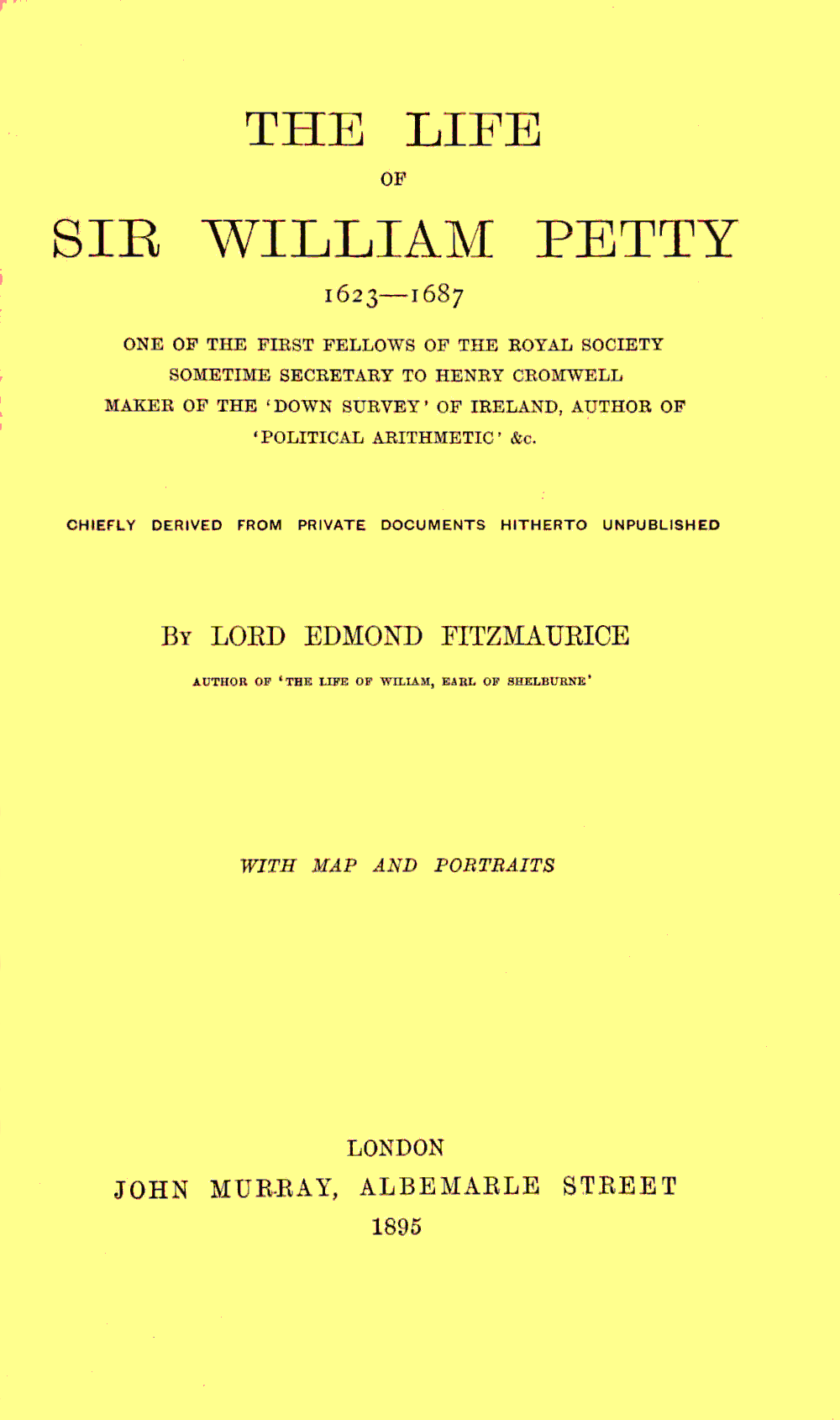
- Author: Lord Edmond Fitzmaurice
- Language: English
- Subject: William Petty
- Genre: biography
- Publisher: John Murray
- Publication date: 1895
- Publication place: United Kingdom
- Pages: 335
- OCLC: 222596028
- Text: The Life of Sir William Petty 1623–1687 at Wikisource

The Life of Sir William Petty 1623–1687 is a book, written by Lord Edmond Fitzmaurice, and published in 1895. It is a biography of Sir William Petty, the 17th-century scientist, known for his inventions, his charting of large parts of Ireland, in the Down Survey, and his publications on many different topics, like "political arithmetic" and political economy.

== Bibliographical information ==
Fitzmaurice, Lord Edmond (1895). The Life of Sir William Petty 1623 – 1687: one of the first Fellows of the Royal Society, sometime Secretary to Henry Cromwell, Maker of the 'Down Survey' of Ireland, Author of 'Political Arithmetic' &c. - chiefly derived from private documents hitherto unpublished. . London: John Murray. OL 7114345M. OCLC 222596028, 906487407, 63403054 – via Wikisource. 335 p.

Fitzmaurice founded his biography of Sir William Petty largely on the manuscripts in the so-called 'Bowood' papers. The papers originally belonging to Sir William Petty passed to his grandson, John Petty, 1st Earl of Shelburne (1706–1761), who bought Bowood House in Wiltshire, England in 1754.

The letters written by Sir William Petty to Sir Robert Southwell (1635–1702) were later added to the Bowood papers by the 3rd Marquis of Lansdowne.

Apart from the Bowood papers, Fitzmaurice also studied manuscripts in the British Museum, in the Bodleian Library and in the Library of Trinity College, Dublin.

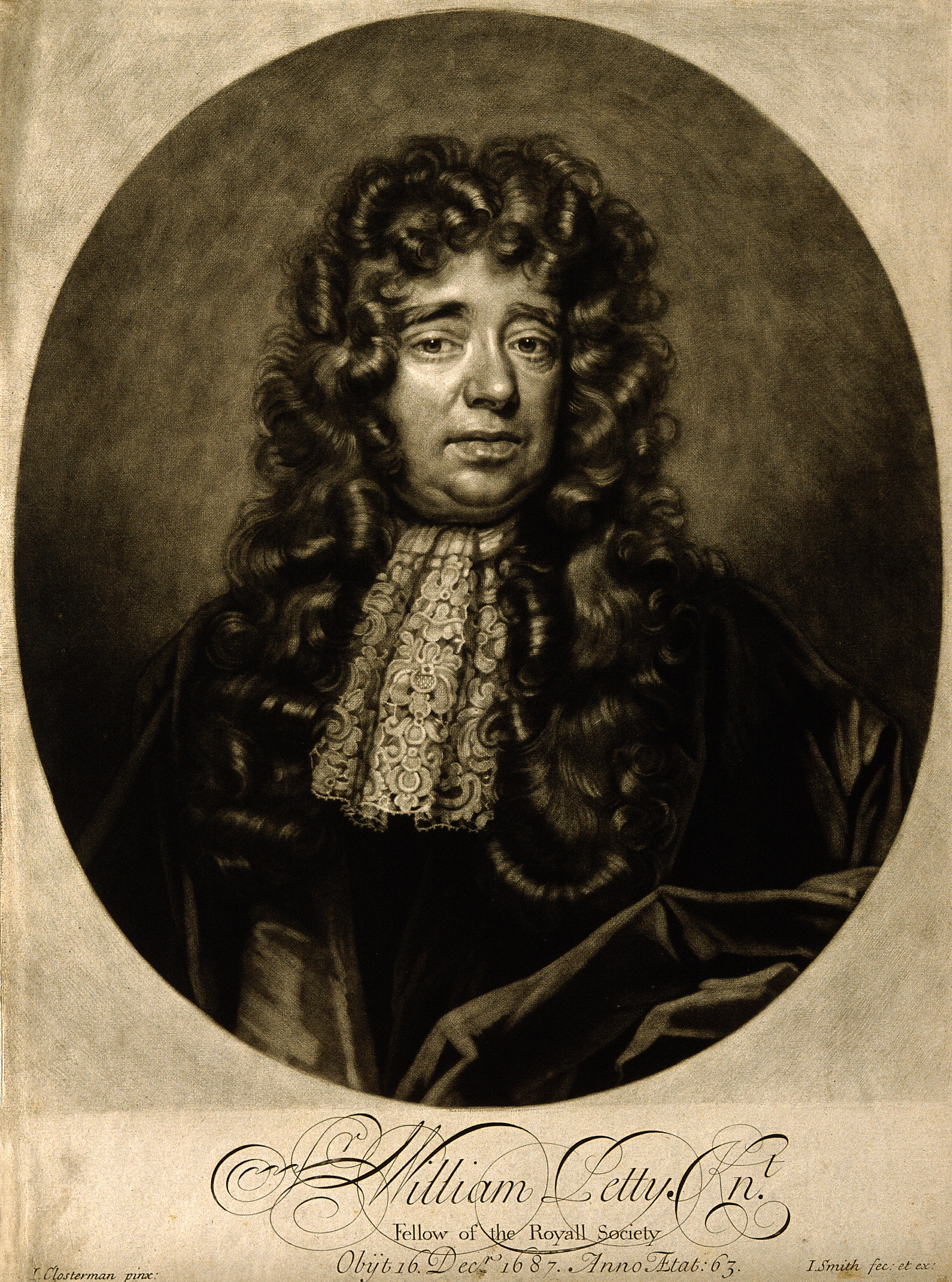
Sir William Petty

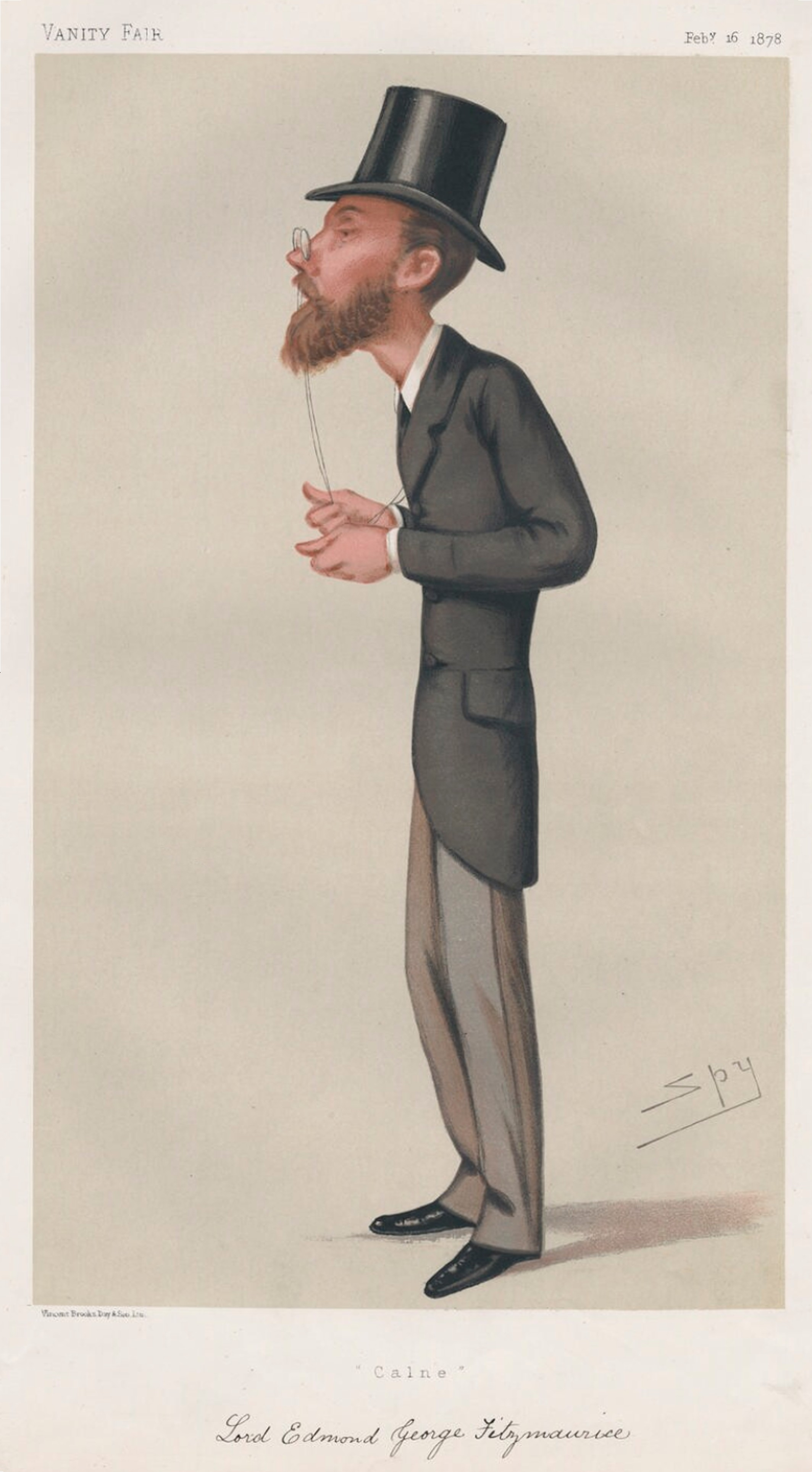
Lord Edmond Fitzmaurice

== The biographer: Lord Edmond Fitzmaurice ==
Lord Edmond Fitzmaurice (1846–1935), also named Edmond George Petty-Fitzmaurice, was a descendant of William Petty and a liberal politician. He also published a biography of his great-grandfather, William Petty, 2nd Earl of Shelburne in 1912, biographies of Granville Leveson-Gower, 2nd Earl Granville (in 1905) and of Charles William Ferdinand, Duke of Brunswick-Wolfenbüttel (in 1901), and some theatre plays.

== The biography ==
The biography is chronological. In the first chapter the life of Petty up to 1652 is summarized. It ends with his application as surgery-general in Cromwell's Irish army.

In the second and third chapter, which cover a total of 80 pages, an extensive description is given of the Down Survey, the cadastral survey carried out by Petty in 1655 and 1656, and especially on the long aftermath of that survey. After the survey Petty was accused of fraud and bribery, and it took him years to clear his name.

The next chapters cover the period from 1660 to 1678, in which Petty published much of the works that, centuries later, brought him fame among economists and statisticians. A separate, central chapter (Chapter 7) is devoted to his "Political Arithmetic" (and his opinions concerning political economy).

The last three chapters give an overview of the period from 1678 until Petty's death in 1687.

== Critical reception ==
The Life of Petty was reviewed in different journals.

Heinrich Cunow wrote a review in Die Neue Zeit, 1896. He was happy to see that a biography on William Petty had appeared: "Finally, more than two hundred years after his death, the most genial of the English political economists of the seventeenth century has found his biographer", writes Cunow in his review in Die Neue Zeit in 1896. (Note: , p. 728: 'Jetzt endlich, über zweihundert Jahre nach seinem Tode, hat auch dieser genialste unter den englischen Nationalökonomen des siebzehnten Jahrhunderts seine Biographen gefunden') But, does he write subsequently, the (large amount of) work that is done by Fitzmaurice, does not provide a satisfactory result and does not offer a clear image of the character (of Petty). Questions like "what where the influences that worked on Petty's intellectual development?" are not answered and only on very few places insight is given into the depth of Petty's ideas ('Ideenwelt'). Neither gives Fitzmaurice an account of the less attractive sides of Petty's character, like his ruthless addiction to profitmaking.

Cunow also makes some remarks concerning Bevan's Sir William Petty: A Study in English Economic Literature (1894).

Charles Henry Hull wrote a review in The Annals of the American Academy of Political and Social Science of 1896, together with a review of Bevan (1894). Hull finds a sharp distinction between the first six chapters (1623–1678) and the last chapters. In the first chapters Fitzmaurice "writes chiefly from sources already well known (...).. Relatively little that is new appears." Whereas the latter part of the book is largely based on (until then less known) Petty's correspondence with Sir Robert Southwell (1635–1702) and on several unprinted letters to Lady Petty.

William Ashley wrote a review in The American Historical Review, 1895. He thought that a reader will profit of this book, full of information, and giving abundant means of arriving at a fair estimate of Petty's character, "only in proportion to what he already knows of the period; and even those who have some tolerable acquaintance with the time will find themselves at a loss to explain many of the allusions with which Petty's papers are bestrewn. The note on pages 296, 301,–"the allusion is not clear,"–might stand with equal propriety at the foot of many other pages."

== Bibliography ==
- Ashley, W.J. (1895). "Book Review: The Life of Sir William Petty etc". The American Historical Review. 1 (1): 134–135. doi:10.2307/1834028. JSTOR 1834028. OCLC 5545157305. (see also: this page (visited 2018-08-27).)
- Bevan, Wilson Lloyd (1894). Sir William Petty - A Study in English Economic Literature . Publications of the American Economic Association, vol. IX, no. 4 – via Wikisource.
- Cunow, Heinrich (1896-08-26). "Lord Edmond Fitzmaurice, "The Life of Sir William Petty" etc". Die neue Zeit: Revue des geistigen und öffentlichen Lebens (in German). 14.2 (49): 728–731. OCLC 914640621.
- Hull, Charles Henry (January 1896). "Review of Sir William Petty, a Study in English Economic Literature by Wilson Lloyd Bevan; The Life of Sir William Petty, etc. by Edmond Fitzmaurice". The Annals of the American Academy of Political and Social Science. 7 (1): 126–128. doi:10.1177/000271629600700115. JSTOR 1009267. OCLC 5546377697. (also includes a review of Bevan (1894))
