= Edward Chamberlayne =

English writer (1616–1703)

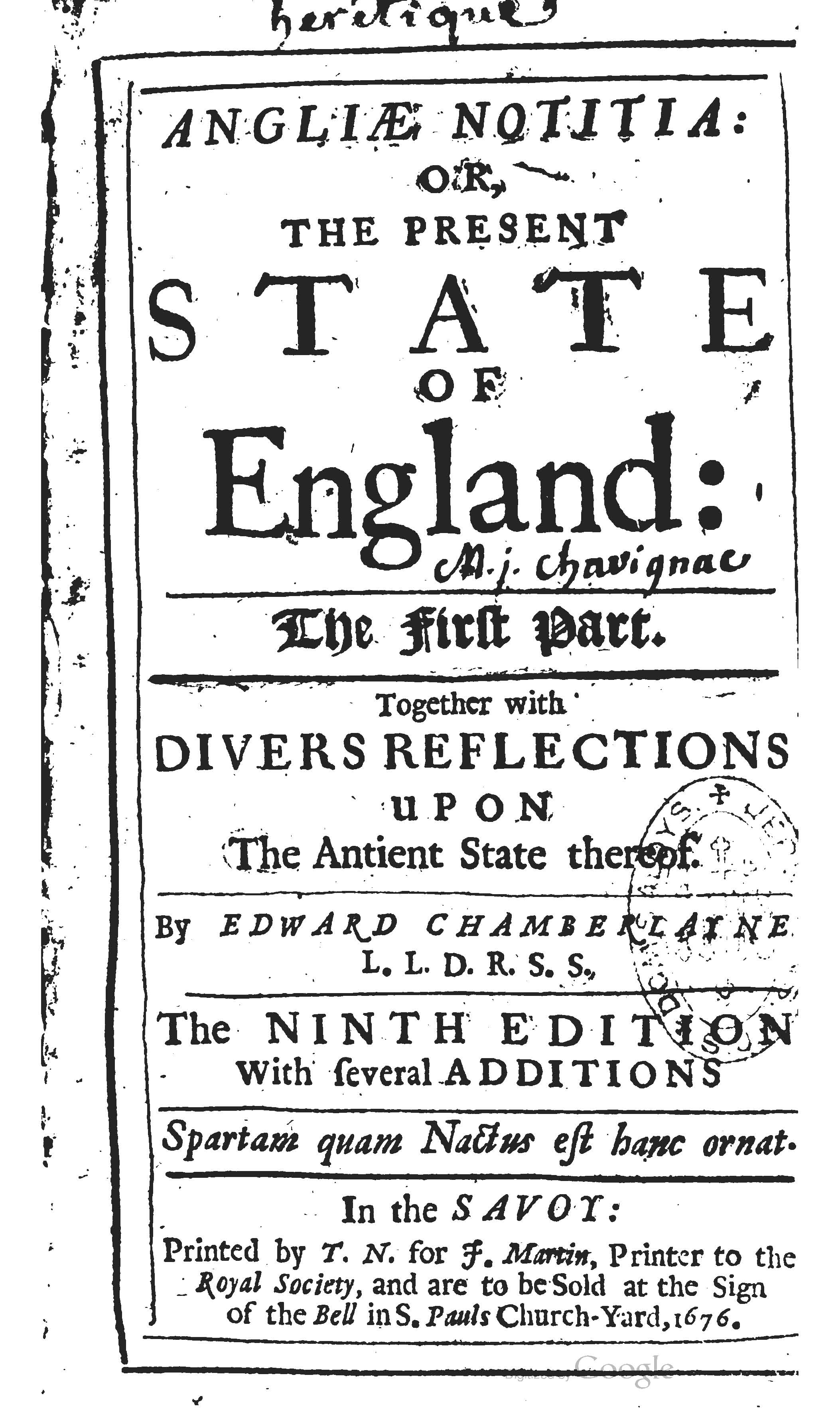
The title page of Chamberlayne's work Angliæ Notitia: Or, The Present State of England: The First Part (9th edition, 1676)

Edward Chamberlayne (13 December 1616 – May 1703) was an English writer, known as the author of The Present State of England.

== Life ==
=== Family background ===
Edward was a grandson of Sir Thomas Chamberlayne, knight, of Prestbury, Gloucestershire (c. 1504-1580), at one time English ambassador in the Low Countries, by his third wife Anne Pierson (died 1588), said to be daughter of Anthony Monck of Potheridge, Devon. The family claimed descent from the Tancarville Chamberlains of Normandy. Edward's father Thomas Chamberlayne (c. 1568-1640), who was settled at Oddington, Gloucestershire through descent of the estate from Sir Thomas, was the younger of two Thomases, both of whom were half-brothers of Sir John Chamberlaine of Prestbury (1559-1617), of Edmund Chamberlaine of Maugersbury (1560-1634), and of their sister Theophila Hewse (or Hughes, living 1588).

=== Career ===
According to his memorial inscription at Oddington, Thomas married Margaret, daughter of Edward Badghott of Prestbury. The eldest of their five sons was born in December 1599: Edward Chamberlaine, the youngest, was born at Oddington on 13 December 1616. They also had five daughters. Edward was first educated at Gloucester, then entered St Edmund Hall, Oxford, at Michaelmas 1634. He subsequently proceeded with a Bachelor of Arts (B.A.) on 20 April 1638, and a Master of Arts (M.A.) on 6 March 1641. During a part of 1641 he held the office of rhetoric reader at Oxford.

When the First English Civil War broke out he began a long continental tour, visiting France, Spain, Italy, Hungary, Bohemia, Sweden, and the Low Countries. At the Restoration he returned to England. During the 1660s he was building his family of nine children. In 1669 he became secretary to Charles Howard, 1st Earl of Carlisle, and went to Stockholm to invest Charles XI of Sweden with the Order of the Garter. He was granted the degrees of Doctor of Laws (LL.D.) at the University of Cambridge (January 1670 – 1671) and of Doctor of Civil Law (D.C.L.) at Oxford (22 June 1672). About 1679 he became tutor to Charles II's illegitimate son, Henry Fitzroy, 1st Duke of Grafton, and he was subsequently English tutor to Prince George of Denmark. He was one of the original Fellows of the Royal Society.

=== Last years ===
Several of his children died during the 1690s, including his intrepid daughter Anne Chamberlyne, who fought in a naval confrontation with the French in June 1690. In later life Edmund lived at Chelsea, and he died there in May 1703. He was buried on 27 May in a vault in Chelsea churchyard. His friend Walter Harris wrote a long and unusual Latin epitaph, which appears to have been the source for many of his biographical details. He requested that he should be buried "after the custom of the ancients, outside the city walls beside the public highway, in a lofty tomb" (More majorum extra urbis pomœria juxta viam publicam, in tumulo editiore heic prope inhumari voluit); and "when he passed away into the land of unknowing, he took such pains to benefit everyone, even those who lived after him, that he ordered certain of his books to be buried with him, cased in wax, sometime perhaps to be for an uncertain posterity" (Tandem in terram oblivionis semigravit, Benefaciendi universis, etiam et posteris, adeo studiosus fuit ut secum condi jusserat libros aliquot suos cera obvolutos feræ forsan posteritati aliquando profuturos). However, when his grave was opened long afterwards they had all turned to dust, only his seal remaining.

== Works ==
His best-known work is a handbook to the social and political condition of England, with lists of public officers and statistics, entitled Angliæ Notitia, or The Present State of England; the publication was an adaptation of L'Estat Nouveau de la France (Paris, 1661). The first edition appeared anonymously in 1669, and was dedicated to the Earl of Carlisle. Two other editions, with the author's name, were issued later in the same year. With the fifth edition of 1671 is bound up the first edition of a second part, containing additional information; in the seventh edition of 1673 a portrait of Charles II, by William Faithorne, makes its first appearance; in the ninth edition of 1676 is a new dedication to the Earl of Danby; with the eighteenth edition of 1694 is bound up a new third part, first issued separately in 1683. Thomas Hearne states that Andrew Allam made major contributions, to the sixteenth edition (1689), and that his information was inserted by Chamberlayne without acknowledgment. Chamberlayne issued the twentieth edition in 1702, and after his death his son John continued to edit the publication. The twenty-first edition (1708) bears the new title Magnæ Britanniæ Notitia, or the Present State of Great Britain. John Chamberlayne died after the issue of the twenty-second edition in 1723, but fourteen editions were subsequently issued by the booksellers, the last being the thirty-sixth and bearing the date 1755.

Charles Henry Hull in his scholarly article 'Petty's Place in the History of Economic Theory' (1900) complained that Present State of England "seldom receives nowadays the attention that it deserves". Hull explains that Chamberlayne's book was the direct impulse to the writing of The Political Anatomy of Ireland and Political Arithmetick by William Petty.

The Present State of England was plagiarised by Guy Miege, who brought out The New State of England in 1691. Although both Chamberlaynes called attention to Miege's theft, Miege continued his handbook till 1748. A French translation of Chamberlayne's second edition appeared in 1669.

Chamberlayne's other books were:

- The Present War Parallel'd, or a Brief Relation of the Five Years' Civil Wars of Henry III, King of England (London, 1647).
- England's Wants (London, 1667).
- The Converted Presbyterian, or the Church of England Justified in Some Practices (London, 1668).
- An Academy or College wherein Young Ladies and Gentlemen may at a Very Moderate Expence be Educated in the True Protestant Religion and in All Virtuous Qualities (London, 1671).
- A Dialogue between an Englishman and a Dutchman concerning the Late Dutch War (London, 1672).

In 1653 Chamberlayne published a volume of translations from Italian, Spanish, and Portuguese, containing Rise and Fall of Count Olivarez, The Unparallel'd Imposture of Mich. di Molina, an. 1641, and The Right of the Present King of Portugal, Don John the Fourth.

== Family ==
In 1658 Chamberlayne married Susannah, daughter of Richard Clifford, with whom he had nine children. Chamberlayne's wife died on 17 December 1703, and was buried beside her husband. They had eight sons and one daughter, among whom were:

- Peregrine Clifford Chamberlayne (1660-1691), the eldest son, was a naval captain.
- John Chamberlayne (1666–1723), a younger son. FRS, Gentleman Waiter to Prince George of Denmark, Gentleman of the Privy Chamber to Queen Anne and to King George I.
- Edward Chamberlayne (1669-1698), the youngest son, admitted to the Inner Temple, but served in the navy.
- Anne Chamberlayne (January 1667-1692). In the costume of a man, she went aboard a fireship under her brother Clifford's command and fought bravely against the French for six hours, on 30 June 1690. After this she married John Spragge, but died shortly afterwards, soon after giving birth to her only daughter.
