= Anne Chamberlyne =

English sailor (1667–1691)

- Born: 1667
- Died: 26 June 1691 (aged 23–24)

Anne Chamberlyne (1667–1691) was a female tar (sailor) who, in 1690, joined the crew of the Griffin Fireship, a ship commanded by her brother, Clifford. In June of 1690, she fought the French at Beachy Head. As noted by Ishida, "Although most women marines came from the lower classes, she came from the nobility."

A plaque in her memory at All Saints Church, Cheyne Walk in London used to exist, but it was destroyed in World War II during a bombing raid.

The plaque stated:

In an adjoining vault lies Anne, the only Daughter of Edward Chamberlyne, Doctor of Law's, born in London, 20 January 1667, who having declined marriage at 23, and aspiring to great achievements unusual to her sex, and age, on 30 June 1690, on board a fire ship in man's clothing, as second Pallas, chaste and fearless, fought valiantly six hours against the French, under the command of her Brother.

Returned from the engagement and after some few months married John Spragg, Esq., with whom, for sixteen more months, she lived most amiably happy. At length, in childbed of a daughter, she encountered death 30 October 1691. This monument, for consort most virtuous and dearly loved, was erected by her husband.

Snatched, alas, how soon by sudden death, unhonoured by progeny like herself, worthy to rule the Main!"

She is the first known female tar in British history.

She was the daughter of Edward Chamberlayne (1616-1703), and sister of John Chamberlayne (1666-1723).
