= Robert Langton Douglas =

British art critic, lecturer and author

Robert Langton Douglas (1 March 1864, Davenham – 14 August 1951, Fiesole) was a British art critic, dealer, lecturer, author, and director of the National Gallery of Ireland. He was nominated, thrice, for the Nobel Prize in Literature in 1903 and 1904.

== Biography ==
Douglas was born in Davenham, Cheshire and educated at New College, Oxford. He was for years a University Extension lecturer, and for a time was in holy orders in the Church of England. From 1895 to 1900 he resided in Italy. While a chaplain there, he wrote a monograph on Fra Angelico in consultation with various scholars, including Bernard Berenson. He relinquished his church appointment in 1900 to become professor of Modern History at the University of Adelaide, Australia, then returned to Italy in 1901 where he wrote A History of Siena.

He lectured on art at the Royal Institution and the Society of Arts, was made dean of the faculty of arts in 1901, and contributed to many magazines and reviews. At age 50, in 1914, Douglas enlisted in the British Army for World War I, and rose from private to staff captain and a position with the War Office in London. Douglas was awarded for his bravery in World War I. In 1916 Douglas was appointed director of the National Gallery of Ireland in Dublin, but resigned in 1923 after a disagreement with its trustees. He settled in New York City in 1940, writing text for the Duveen art galleries.

Known chiefly as an authority on Sienese art, his most important publications are an edition of Crowe and Cavalcaselle's History of Painting in Italy (1903, et. seq.), Fra Angelico (second edition, 1902), A History of Siena (1902), La Maioliche di Siena (1904) and Illustrated Catalogue of Pictures of Siena and Objects of Art (1904).

Douglas was the father of Marshal of the Royal Air Force Sholto Douglas, 1st Baron Douglas of Kirtleside and Terence Wilmot Hutchison. Douglas's daughter Clare (the half-sister of Sholto Douglas) was the second wife of writer J. D. Salinger.

== Publications ==
- Tudor Translation Series, 1898
- Fra Angelico, G. Bell and Sons, London, 1900 (reprinted in 1902)
- A History of Siena, J. Murray, London, 1902
- A History of Painting in Italy, Umbria, Florence and Siena, from the Second to the Sixteenth Century, J. Murray, London, 1903-1914
- La Maioliche di Siena, 1904
- Illustrated Catalogue of Pictures of Siena and Objects of Art, 1904.
- Storia politica e sociale della Repubblica di Siena, Editrice Libreria Senese, Siena, 1926
- Leonardo da Vinci: his Life and Pictures, University of Chicago, 1944
