= Andrew Allam =

English academic and miscellaneous writer

Andrew Allam (1655 – 17 June 1685) was an English academic and miscellaneous writer.

== Life ==
The son of a humble family, he was born at Garsington, near Oxford, and was educated under a noted schoolmaster of the time, William Wildgoose, of Brasenose College, at Denton, near his native place. In 1671, he entered at St Edmund Hall, Oxford, of which he subsequently became the vice-principal. In 1680 he took holy orders.

== Works ==
His chief works are some additions to Edward Chamberlayne's Angliae Notitia (1684), and to Helvicus's Historical and Chronological Theatre, (published 1687); the Epistle prefixed to Richard Cosin's Ecclesiae Anglicanae Politeia, &c, containing an account of the doctor's life; and a translation of the life of Iphicrates, Oxford 1684. He assisted Anthony Wood in his Athenae Oxon, and had projected a Notitia Ecclesiae Anglicanae, or History of Cathedrals, but was prevented by death from completing his plan.
