= Charles Henry Hull =

American economist and historian (1864–1936)

- Born: 29 September 1864; Ithaca, New York, U.S.
- Died: 15 July 1936 (aged 71)

Academic background
- Education: Cornell University

Academic work
- Discipline: History of economic theory
- Institutions: Cornell University

Charles Henry Hull (September 29, 1864 – July 15, 1936) was an American economist and historian. Aside from several years at universities in Germany, he spent his entire academic career at Cornell University. In 1900, he was appointed professor of American History.

In 1899, he published The Economic Writings of Sir William Petty in two volumes. This edition has become the standard source for referring to the economic writings of Sir William Petty (1620–1687).

== Life and work ==
Charles Henry Hull was born in Ithaca, New York. He received his Ph.B. at Cornell University in 1886. His thesis was titled Some considerations on agricultural rent. He was appointed Assistant Librarian in 1889. In 1890, he went to Germany for two years, to study economics and history. He received the degree of Doctor of Philosophy from the University of Halle in 1892.

He returned to Cornell University to become an instructor in Political and Social Institutions. In 1893 he was appointed assistant professor of Political Economy. He was offered a full professorate in political economy in 1900, but choose to take a position as a professor of American history.

In 1908, he became Dean of the Arts College of Cornell University.

In 1912, he was appointed Goldwin Smith Professor of American History.

In 1914, he visited Europe on a three-month trip. During this trip he represented Cornell University at the 300th anniversary of the founding of the University of Groningen, the Netherlands.

Charles Henry Hull retired from active service in 1931.

== The Economic Writings of Sir William Petty ==
In 1899 Charles Henry Hull published The Economic Writings of Sir William Petty (in two volumes), together with an introduction about the life and work of Petty. (Cambridge : Cambridge University Press)

Volume 1 contains

- Introduction (by Charles Henry Hull).
- A Treatise of Taxes and Contributions (London, 1662).
- Verbum Sapienti (written 1665, published London, 1691)
- The Political Anatomy of Ireland (written 1672, published London, 1690).
- Political Arithmetic (written 1672–6, published London, 1690).

Volume 2 contains

- Natural and Political Observations upon the Bills of Mortality. By Capt. John Graunt. The Fifth Edition. London, 1676. p. 314-345
- Sir William Petty's Quantulumcunque concerning Money. (written 1682, published London, 1695). p. 437-448 (Quantulumcunque = ‘something, be it ever so small’)
- Another Essay in Political Arithmetick concerning the Growth of the City of London. (written 1682, published London, 1683). p. 451-478
- Observations upon the Dublin-Bills of Mortality, 1681, and the State of that City. (London, 1683). p. 479-491
- Further Observation upon the Dublin-Bills: or, Accompts of the Houses, Hearths, Baptisms, and Burials in that City. (London, 1686). p. 493-498
- Two Essays in Political Arithmetick, concerning the People, Housing, Hospitals, &c. of London and Paris. (London, 1687). p. 515-518
- Observations upon the Cities of London and Rome. (London, 1687). p. 521-544
- Five Essays in Political Arithmetick. (London, 1687). p. 521-544
- A Treatise of Ireland. (1687). From the Additional MS. in the British Museum. p. 545-621
- Appendix. p. 622-632
- Bibliography of the Printed Writings of Sir William Petty. p. 633-652
- Supplement to the Bibliography of Petty's Works. p. 653-657
- Bibliography of the Natural and Political Observations. p. 658-660
- List of Books and Manuscripts used. p. 661-672
- Index. p. 673-700

some of the separate texts have small introductions by Hull. This edition of the (economic) writings of William Petty is until today the most complete and most often cited source for the economic texts of the “founder of political economy”.

Together with his articles on 'Petty or Graunt' (1896) and 'Petty's Place in the History of Economic Theory' in the Quarterly Journal of Economics (1900), the Economic Writings of Sir William Petty have made Charles Henry Hull an authority on William Petty for more than a century. He was praised for the “fine edition of Petty's writing” ninety years later by Hutchison in 1988.

== Graunt and Petty ==
The reason why Hull included the Observations on the Bills of Mortality by John Graunt in The Economic Writings of Petty is not immediately obvious. But the background is that for a long period of time there was a controversy on the authorship of the text. Some scholars have claimed that Petty was the author. Among these scholars the Marquess of Lansdowne was one of the most prominent.

Although it is more or less generally accepted that Graunt was indeed the author of the Observations on the Bills of Mortality, it is much less clear how great the influence has been of Petty on the essay. That Petty had a certain influence is quiet sure.

== Selected bibliography ==
- 1886 (dissertation): Some considerations on agricultural rent. Ithaca, N.Y.
- 1896: 'Graunt or Petty? The Authorship of the “Observations upon the Bills of Mortality”.' In: Political Science Quarterly, Vol. XI., no. 1, p. 105-132 (also reprinted as a separate publication; Boston : Ginn & Co.).
- 1899: The Economic Writings of Sir William Petty. Edited by Charles Henry Hull. Cambridge : Cambridge University Press. in two volumes.
- 1900: 'Petty's Place in the History of Economic Theory.' In: Quarterly Journal of Economics,
- 1914: 'The service of statistics to history.' In: Quarterly publications of the American Statistical Association. Vol. 14, no. 105 (March 1914), p. 30-39.

== Bibliography ==
- Roll, Eric (1978) [1938]. A History of Economic Thought (4th revised and enlarged ed.). London & Boston: Faber & Faber Ltd. ISBN 0-571-04804-8.
- Hutchison, Terence (1988). Before Adam Smith : The Emergence of Political Economy, 1662-1776. Oxford & New York: Basil Blackwell. ISBN 0-631-15898-7.
