= The Quarterly Journal of Economics =

Academic journal from Harvard University

- Discipline: Economics
- Language: English
- Edited by: Robert J. Barro, Lawrence F. Katz, Nathan Nunn, Andrei Shleifer, Stefanie Stantcheva

Publication details
- History: 1886–present
- Publisher: Oxford University Press for Harvard University Department of Economics
- Frequency: Quarterly
- Impact factor: 5.920 (2011)

Standard abbreviations
- ISO 4: Q. J. Econ.

Indexing
- ISSN: 0033-5533 (print); 1531-4650 (web)
- JSTOR: 00335533
- OCLC no.: 1763227

Links
- Journal homepage; Online access

The Quarterly Journal of Economics is a peer-reviewed academic journal published by the Oxford University Press for the Harvard University Department of Economics. Its current editors-in-chief are Robert J. Barro, Lawrence F. Katz, Nathan Nunn, Andrei Shleifer, and Stefanie Stantcheva.

== History ==
It is the oldest professional journal of economics in the English language, and second-oldest in any language after the Zeitschrift für die gesamte Staatswissenschaft. It covers all aspects of the field—from the journal's traditional emphasis on micro-theory to both empirical and theoretical macroeconomics.

Editors of the QJE
Editor	Period
anonymous	1886-1947
Edward H. Chamberlin	1948-1957
Arthur Smithies	1958-1965
Gottfried Haberler	1966-1970
Richard A. Musgrave	1971-1975
Robert Dorfman	1976-1984
Jerry Green	1978-1980
Olivier J. Blanchard	1980-1998
David Hartman	1980-1984
Joseph P. Kalt	1980-1984
Malcolm Gillis	1980-1980
Richard B. Freeman	1980-1980
Michael Roemer	1981-1984
David A. Wise	1982-1984
Lawrence H. Summers	1985-1990
Eric S. Maskin	1985-1989
Andrei Shleifer	1989-1998, 2013-
Lawrence F. Katz	1991-
Edward L. Glaeser	1999-2008
Alberto Alesina	1999-2003
Robert J. Barro	2004-
Elhanan Helpman	2009-2014
Jeremy C. Stein	2012-2012
Pol Antràs	2015-2021
Stefanie Stantcheva	2020-
Nathan Nunn	2021-

== Reception ==
According to the Journal Citation Reports, the journal has a 2015 impact factor of 6.662, ranking it first out of 347 journals in the category "Economics". It is generally regarded as one of the top 5 journals in economics, together with the American Economic Review, Econometrica, the Journal of Political Economy, and The Review of Economic Studies.

== Notable papers ==
Some of the most influential and well-read papers in economics have been published in the Quarterly Journal of Economics including:

- "Distribution as Determined by a Law of Rent" (1891), by John B. Clark
- "The Positive Theory of Capital and Its Critics" (1895), by Eugen von Böhm-Bawerk
- "Petty's Place in the History of Economic Theory" (1900), by Charles Henry Hull
- "Fallacies in the Interpretation of Social Cost" (1924), by Frank H. Knight
- "The General Theory of Employment" (1937), by John Maynard Keynes (an expansion on Keynes' General Theory)
- "The Interpretation of Voting in the Allocation of Economic Resources" (1943), by Howard Rothmann Bowen
- "A Contribution to the Theory of Economic Growth" (1956), by Robert Solow
- "The Market for "Lemons": Quality Uncertainty and the Market Mechanism" (1970), by George Akerlof
- "Job Market Signaling" (1973), by Michael Spence
- "Equilibrium in Competitive Insurance Markets: The economics of markets with imperfect information" (1976), by Michael Rothschild and Joseph Stiglitz
- "A Reformulation of the Economic Theory of Fertility" (1988), by Robert Barro and Gary Becker
- "A Theory of Competition among Pressure Groups for Political Influence" (1983), by Gary Becker
- "A Contribution to the Empirics of Economic Growth" (1992), by N. Gregory Mankiw, David Romer, and David N. Weil
- "Golden Eggs and Hyperbolic Discounting" (1997), by David Laibson
- "Does Social Capital Have An Economic Payoff? A Cross-Country Investigation" (1997) by Stephen Knack and Philip Keefer
- "A Theory of Fairness, Competition, and Cooperation" (1999), by Ernst Fehr and Klaus M. Schmidt
- "Monetary Policy Rules And Macroeconomic Stability: Evidence And Some Theory" (2000), by Richard Clarida, Jordi Galí, and Mark Gertler
- "Information Technology, Workplace Organization, and the Demand for Skilled Labor: Firm-Level Evidence" (2002) by Timothy F. Bresnahan, Erik Brynjolfsson and Lorin M. Hitt
