= John Chamberlayne =

English writer and translator (c.1668–1723)

John Chamberlayne (c.1668–1723) was an English writer, translator, and courtier.

== Life ==
He was a younger son of Edward Chamberlayne and his wife Susannah Clifford. In 1685 he entered Trinity College, Oxford as a commoner.

Leaving Oxford without a degree, he proceeded to the University of Leyden, where on 12 May 1688 he entered himself as a student. Here, it would seem, he chiefly studied modern languages, of which, according to contemporary report, he knew sixteen. On his return he filled various offices about the court. He was successively gentleman waiter to Prince George of Denmark, gentleman of the Privy Chamber first to Queen Anne and then to King George I. He was also secretary to Queen Anne's Bounty Commission, and on the commission of the peace for Middlesex. In 1702 Chamberlayne was elected a fellow of the Royal Society.

Chamberlayne died at his house in Petty-France (now York Street), Westminster on 2 November 1723, and on 6 November was interred in the family burying-ground at Chelsea, where he had a residence, and where on his church wall a tablet was placed to his memory.

== Works ==
Chamberlayne's major work was his translation of Gerard Brandt's History of the Reformation in the Low Countries, 4 vols. 1720–3. In the preface to a part of this, published in 1719, he relates that Gaspar Fagel assured Gilbert Burnet "that it was worth his while to learn Dutch, only for the pleasure of reading Brandt's History of the Reformation". Chamberlayne also continued his father's Present State of England after his death in 1703, and issued five editions. The son's name still appeared on editions that were published after his own death (as late as 1756).

He also published translations of:

- Samuel von Pufendorf's History of Popedom, containing the Rise, Progress, and Decay thereof, 1691
- The Lord's Prayer, as Oratio Dominica in diversas omnium fere gentium linguas versa, Amsterdam, 1715
- Bernard Nieuwentyt's Religious Philosopher, or the right Use of contemplating the Works of the Creator, 3 vols. 1718
- Bernard Le Bovier de Fontenelle's Lives of the French Philosophers, 1721; and
- Jacques Saurin's Dissertations, Historical, Critical, Theological, and Moral, of the most Memorable Events of the Old and New Testaments, 1723.

In 1685 he published a translation of Philippe Sylvestre Dufour's The Manner of making Coffee, Tea, and Chocolate as it is used in most parts of Europe, Asia, Africa, and America, with their Vertues. This tract became popular. From Oxford on 24 June 1686 he dated his translation of A Treasure of Health by Castor Durante Da Gualdo, Physician and Citizen of Rome (Il Tesoro della Sanità, 1586).

Chamberlayne contributed three papers to Philosophical Transactions:

- A Relation of the Effects of a Storm of Thunder and Lightning at Sampford Courtney in Devonshire on 7 Oct. 1711 (No. 336, p. 528).
- Remarks on the Plague at Copenhagen in the year 1711 (No. 337, p. 279).
- An Account of the Sunk Island in Humber (No. 361, p. 1014).

In the Sloane Manuscripts there are letters from Chamberlayne on the affairs of the Royal Society. He was also a member of the Society for the Propagation of Christian Knowledge, and translated for them Jean-Frédéric Osterwald's Arguments of the Book and Chapters of the Old and New Testament, 3 vols. 1716; new ed. 3 vols. 1833.
