= Terence Wilmot Hutchison =

British economist

Terence Wilmot Huchinson FBA
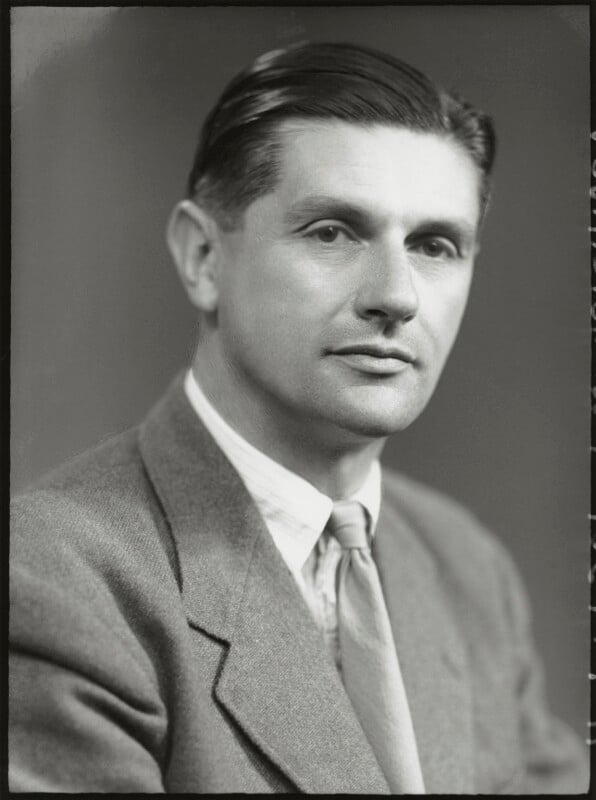
- Hutchinson in 1951
- Born: 13 August 1912; Bournemouth, England
- Died: 6 October 2007 (aged 95); Winchester, England
- Spouse(s): Loretta Hack (m. 1935; died 1981) Christine Donaldson (m. 1983; died 2003)
- Children: 3
- Parent(s): Grace Hutchison (mother); Robert Langton Douglas (father)

Academic background
- Education: Peterhouse, Cambridge; London School of Economics

Academic work
- Discipline: economic methodology history of economics
- Institutions: University of Bonn; Baghdad Teacher Training College; University of Hull; London School of Economics; University of Birmingham

Terence Wilmot Hutchison FBA (13 August 1912 – 6 October 2007) was an economist and economic historian.

== Early years ==
The son of Robert Langton Douglas, Hutchison was born in Bournemouth and was educated at Tonbridge School. Remaining unaware of his father's identity until his teens, he was a half-brother to Marshal of the Royal Air Force William Sholto Douglas, 1st Baron Douglas of Kirtleside. His Australian mother, Grace Hutchison (1870–1935), brought him up in the Christian Scientist faith.

Hutchison attended Peterhouse, Cambridge in 1931 to study the classics but switched to economics, taking his bachelor of arts degree, with first class honours, in 1934. Subsequently, he spent a year at the London School of Economics (LSE), then became a lecturer in economics in Bonn, Germany in 1935, due to an interest in Ludwig Wittgenstein. He spent approximately three years in Bonn, learning the German language while researching German studies in economics.

Following a brief period in Vienna, Hutchison moved to Baghdad in 1938 to take up a position at a teacher training college. The installation of a pro-Nazi regime in Iraq in 1941 prompted him to move to Bombay, where he joined the Indian Army as an intelligence officer, serving initially on the Northwest Frontier, then in Egypt and finally in Delhi.

== University career ==
In 1946, he began his British university career with a position at the University of Hull. After a year at Hull, he moved to the LSE, where he became interested in the history of economics. The University of Birmingham named him Mitsui Professor of Economics in 1956, holding that position he held until he retired in 1978. He continued to teach the history of economics for another two years.

After retiring, Hutchison published the book Before Adam Smith in 1988, the first book in English to systematically analyze 18th Century economic writing before the publication of Adam Smith's seminal work The Wealth of Nations (1776).

== Personal life ==
Hutchison married the German national Loretta Hack, a student in Bonn, in 1935. She died in 1981. In 1983, he married the American academic Christine Donaldson, who died in 2003. He had three children.

== Selected publications ==
- Hutchison, Terence W. (1938). The Significance and Basic Postulates of Economic Theory. Macmillan – via Internet Archive. This work established his credentials as an economic methodologist.
- _____, "The Significance and Basic Postulates of Economic Theory: A Reply to Professor Knight". Journal of Political Economy. 49 (5): 732–750. 1941. JSTOR 1824616.
- Eucken, Walter (1950). The Foundations of Economics. Translated by Hutchinson, Terence Wilmot. London: William Hodge and Company – via Internet Archive.
- _____, 1953. A Review of Economic Doctrines 1870-1929, Oxford
- _____, 2000. On the Methodology of Economics and the Formalist Revolution, Edward Elgar. Description and preview.
- Knight, F.H. (1940). "'What is Truth' in Economics," [article review of Hutchison, 1938]". Journal of Political Economy. 48 (1): 1–32. JSTOR 1825908. Reprinted in Knight, F.H. (1956). On the History and Method of Economics: Selected essays. Chicago: University of Chicago Press. pp. 151-178. ISBN 978-0226446899.. See also Knight, F.H. (October 1941). "The Significance and Basic Postulates of Economic Theory: A Rejoinder". Journal of Political Economy. 49 (5): 750–753. JSTOR 1824617.

== Archives ==
Papers related to Hutchison's career are held at the Cadbury Research Library, University of Birmingham.
