= John Graunt =

British demographer

- Born: 24 April 1620; London
- Died: 18 April 1674 (aged 53); London

John Graunt (24 April 1620 – 18 April 1674) has been regarded as the founder of demography. Graunt was one of the first demographers, and perhaps the first epidemiologist, though by profession he was a haberdasher. He was bankrupted later in life by losses suffered during Great Fire of London and the discrimination he faced following his conversion to Catholicism.

== Biography ==
Born in London, John Graunt was the eldest of the seven or eight children of Henry and Mary Graunt. Graunt's father was a draper who had moved to London from Hampshire. In February 1641, Graunt married Mary Scott, with whom he had one son (Henry) and three daughters. He became a freeman of the Drapers' Company at age 21.

Graunt worked in his father's shop until his father died in 1662, and Graunt became influential in the City. He was able to secure the post of professor of music for his friend William Petty in 1650. He served in various ward offices in Cornhill ward, becoming a common councilman about 1669–71, warden of the Drapers' Company in 1671 and a major in the trained band.

Graunt, along with Sir William Petty, developed early human statistical and census methods that provided a framework for modern demography. He is credited with producing and widely distributing the first life table, giving probabilities of survival to each age. This was remarkable considering the Bills of Mortality did not include age at death, thus Graunt used his knowledge of mathematics to create such a table. Graunt is also considered as one of the first experts in epidemiology, since his famous book was concerned mostly with public health statistics.

The erudition of Graunt's book, Natural and Political Observations Made Upon the Bills of Mortality, led Graunt to the Royal Society. On 5 February 1661, Graunt presented fifty copies of his book to the Royal Society of London, to which he was subsequently elected a fellow in 1662 with the endorsement of King Charles II. King Charles II's recommendation was notable due to Graunt's status as a tradesman, as the King suggested to the Royal Society that it should accept "any more such Tradesman." Graunt was chosen as a member of the council of the Royal Society in November 1664 and represented the Society at various meetings.

Graunt's house was destroyed in the Great Fire of London at which point he was a shareholder in the New River Company. Because of this, Graunt encountered many financial problems that eventually led him to declare bankruptcy. One of his daughters became a nun in a convent in Ghent, in the Spanish Netherlands, and Graunt decided to convert to Catholicism at a time when Catholics and Protestants were struggling for control of England and Europe, leading to prosecutions for recusancy. John Graunt died of jaundice and liver disease at the age of 53. John Aubrey reported that he was "a pleasant facetious companion and very hospitable" and noted that his death was "lamented by all good men that had the happinesse to knowe him."

== Natural and Political Observations Made Upon the Bills of Mortality ==
Graunt's book Natural and Political Observations Made upon the Bills of Mortality (published 1662 Old Style or 1663 New Style) compiled and analyzed data from the Bills of Mortality. Graunt, calculating with the Rule of Three and using ratios obtained by comparing years in the Bills of Mortality, was able to make estimates about the size of the population of London and England, birth rates and mortality rates of males and females, and the rise and spread of certain diseases.

=== Bills of Mortality ===
Bill of Mortality from 1606, one of the earlier times which John Graunt looked at in his work.

John Graunt's analysis in Natural and Political Observations Made Upon the Bills of Mortality consisted of a compilation and an analysis of data from the Bills of Mortality. The Bills of Mortality were documents offering information about the births, deaths, and causes of death in London parishes, printed and distributed weekly on Thursdays (in addition to an annual report released in December). The Bills of Mortality were said by Graunt to begin in 1592, and consistently released starting in 1603. Graunt describes how the data were collected for these Bills in his Natural and Political Observations Made Upon the Mortality of Man:

"When anyone dies, then either by tolling, or by ringing of a Bell, or by bespeaking of a Grave of the Sexton, the same is known to the Searchers, corresponding with the said Sexton. The Searchers hereupon...examine by what Disease, or Casualty the corps died. Hereupon they make their Report to the Parish-Clerk, and he, every Tuesday night, carries in an Accompt of all the Burials, and Christnings, hapning that Week, to the Clerk of the Hall. On Wednesday the general Accompt is made up, and Printed, and on Thursdays published and dispersed to the several Families, who will pay for four shillings per Annum for them.”

Graunt's description of the method of data collection for the Bills of Mortality also serves as an example of Graunt's use of scrutiny in appraising the data he was analyzing. Graunt critiqued the collectors ("Searchers") who determined cause of death of the corpses; this critique manifested in Graunt's investigations into the effects on mortality of certain diseases, as Graunt suggested many causes of death were misrepresented.

Table of Casualties in Natural and Political Observations Made Upon the Bills of Mortality (5th edition, published 1676)

=== Epidemiology ===
Graunt's work reached rudimentary conclusions about the mortality and morbidity of certain diseases. Graunt was highly skeptical of the number of deaths recorded in the Bills of Mortality as due to the plague. Graunt speculated about the reasons for these misclassifications, one of which includes the reliability of those reporting causes of death in the Bills of Mortality.

Another example of Graunt's work in epidemiology is his investigation of the sudden surge in deaths in 1634 due to Rickets. Graunt looked at two other causes of death--"Liver-grown" and "Spleen"—in addition to "Rickets," combining the three and comparing the frequency of deaths due to each cause between years. Graunt investigated if the sudden increase in deaths due to rickets in the Bills of Mortality was actually the result of misclassifying corpses who were said to have died from "Liver-grown" and "Spleen." Graunt concluded that "Rickets" as a cause of death was at a maximum for the first time.

=== Editions of the book ===
Graunt's work ran to five editions. The first edition lists John Graunt as a citizen. The first edition was printed and presented by Graunt to the Royal Society of London, after which Graunt was accepted as a member. All successive editions list John Graunt as a member of the Royal Society. The final edition was printed in 1676, after Graunt's death, likely with the help of Sir William Petty.

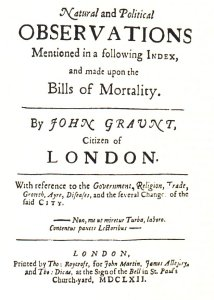
Title page of the first edition of Graunt's' Observations on the Bills of Mortality (1662)

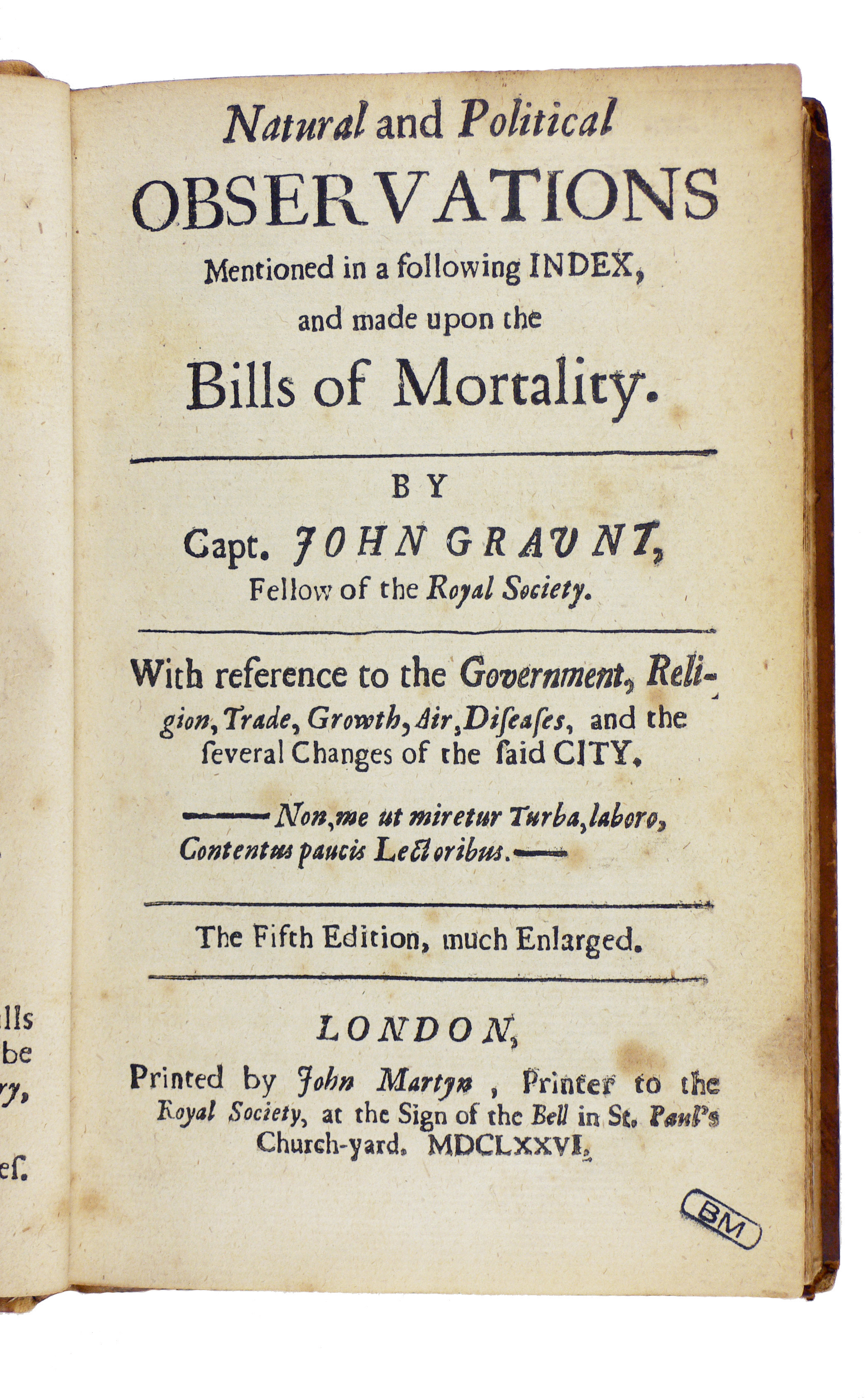
Title page of the fifth edition of Graunt's' Observations on the Bills of Mortality (1676)

== Impact ==
John Graunt's application of theory to data was one of the first instances of descriptive statistics. Some of Graunt's tables are the only resource for population data for certain periods of time, due to lost records in the Great Fire of London. After the publication of Graunt's work, France began to collect more descriptive and consistent censuses, though it is unknown if there was a direct connection between these two events. Graunt's work is still used today to study population trends and mortality, for example, studies on suicide. Tribute to Graunt's pioneering work was paid by Sir Liam Donaldson in 2012 on the tenth anniversary of the Public Health Observatories.

Graunt is the narrator of Anthony Clarvoe's 1993 play The Living, which portrays the bubonic plague in London.

== See also ==
- Ratio estimator
