= Wilson Lloyd Bevan =

American historian (1866–1935)

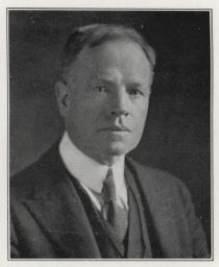
- Bevan c. 1921
- Born: June 17, 1866; Baltimore County, Maryland, U.S.
- Died: April 8, 1935 (aged 68)
- Education: Columbia University (MA); Ludwig-Maximilians-Universität München (PhD)
- Occupation: Historian
- Spouse(s): Mary Kaylett; Caroline Eckel
- Father: George Frazier Bevan

Wilson Lloyd Bevan (June 17, 1866 – April 8, 1935) was an American historian.

== Biography ==
Wilson Lloyd Bevan was born June 17, 1866, in Baltimore County, Maryland. He was the son of George Frazier Bevan.

In 1886, Wilson Lloyd Bevan ("of Baltimore") was a "candidate for the degree of Bachelor of Arts" at Johns Hopkins University. He later obtained his degree of Master of Arts from Columbia University, New York City, and his PhD degree at the Ludwig-Maximilians-Universität München (Germany).

He served as professor of history at Sewanee: The University of the South in Tennessee, and subsequently at Kenyon College, Ohio.

He was engaged in journalism and for many years he was the New York Churchman's Associate Editor.

In 1920, he started at the University of Delaware as associate professor of history.

In 1926, he was a minister. In that year he was mentioned as "The Rev. Wilson Lloyd Bevan, M.A., Columbia; S.T.B., General; Ph. D. Munich", Professor of Systematic Divinity and Acting Professor of Philosophy at the University of the South.

Wilson Lloyd Bevan married first to Mary Kaylett, then to Caroline Eckel about 1926. He died April 8, 1935.

== Bibliography ==
- 1893: (part of) dissertation (Munich): Sir William Petty. Canterbury : J.A. Jennings. 32 pgs.
- 1894: Sir William Petty : A Study in English Economic Literature (published as a 'Publication of the American Economic Association', vol. IX, no. 4)
- 1913: The World's Leading Conquerors. New York : H. Holt.
- 1929: Bevan, Wilson Lloyd; E. Melvin Williams, eds. (1929). History of Delaware, Past and Present. New York: Lewis Historical Publishing. (4 vols.)
