= Morning Exercises =

Morning Exercises refers to a religious observance by Puritans in London which started at the beginning of the English Civil War.

== Origins ==
As most of the citizens of London had either a near relation or friend in the army of the Earl of Essex, clergymen were getting overwhelmed with requests to include prayers for these soldiers in their Sunday services. So a group of them agreed to set aside an hour at 7 am, every morning, with half an hour for prayer and half an hour for a broader exhortation of the population. It was started by Thomas Case the Presbyterian minister at St. Mary Magdalen, Milk Street and continued there for a month. The exercises were then taken up by other churches across the City of London. Shortly after Westminster Abbey also started to host religious lectures between 6 - 8am, not only for local residents, but also for Members of Parliament. The preachers here included Edmund Staunton, Philip Nye, Stephen Marshall, Herbert Palmer, Charles Herle, Jeremiah Whitaker and Thomas Hill.

== At Cripplegate ==
After the Civil War the Morning Exercises were continued, with many collected by Samuel Annesley being subsequently published in six volumes.

== Preachers published by Annesley ==
The following list of 75 was published in 1844.

- Richard Adams
- Vincent Alsop
- Samuel Annesley
- Matthew Barker
- William Bates
- Richard Baxter
- Andrew Bromhall
- Daniel Burgess
- Edmund Calamy the Elder
- Thomas Case
- Stephen Charnock
- David Clarkson
- Thomas Cole
- John Collins
- William Cooper
- Zachary Crofton
- Thomas Doolittle
- Roger Drake
- Richard Fairclough
- Christopher Fowler
- Theophilus Gale
- John Gibbon
- Thomas Gouge
- William Greenhill
- George Hamond
- Joseph Hill
- William Hook
- John Howe
- Henry Hurst
- John Jackson
- Samuel Jacomb
- Thomas Jacomb
- James Janeway
- William Jenkyn
- John Kitchen
- Edward Lawrence
- Samuel Lee
- Stephen Lobb
- Thomas Lye
- Thomas Mallery
- Thomas Manton
- Richard Mayo
- John Meriton
- John Millward
- Benjamin Needler
- Christopher Nesse
- John Oakes
- John Owen
- Thomas Parson
- Elias Pledger
- Matthew Poole
- Thomas Senior
- John Sheffield
- Mr. Simmons
- John Singleton
- Samuel Slater
- Richard Steel
- Matthew Sylvester
- William Taylor
- John Tillotson
- Robert Trail
- Edward Veal
- Nathaniel Vincent
- Thomas Vincent
- Peter Vinke
- Thomas Wadsworth
- Stephen Watkins
- Thomas Watson
- John Wells
- Edward West
- William Whittaker
- Thomas White
- Henry Wilkinson
- Daniel Williams
- Thomas Woodcock
