= History of the Puritans from 1649 =

From 1649 to 1660, Puritans in the Commonwealth of England were allied to the state power held by the military regime, headed by Lord Protector Oliver Cromwell until he died in 1658. They broke into numerous sects, of which the Presbyterian group comprised most of the clergy, but was deficient in political power since Cromwell's sympathies were with the Independents. During this period, the term "Puritan" becomes largely moot, therefore, in British terms, though the situation in New England was very different. After the English Restoration, the Savoy Conference and Uniformity Act 1662 and Great Ejection drove most of the Puritan ministers from the Church of England, and the outlines of the Puritan movement changed over a few decades into the collections of Presbyterian and Congregational churches, operating as they could as Dissenters under changing regimes.

== English Interregnum, 1649–1660 ==
=== Failure of the Presbyterian church, 1649–1654 ===
The English Interregnum was a period of religious diversity in England. With the creation of the Commonwealth of England in 1649, the government passed to the English Council of State, a group dominated by Oliver Cromwell, an advocate of religious liberty. In 1650, at Cromwell's behest, the Rump Parliament abolished the Act of Uniformity 1558, meaning that while England now had an officially established church with Presbyterian polity, there was no legal requirement that anyone attend services in the established church.

In 1646, the Long Parliament had abolished episcopacy in the Church of England and replaced it with a presbyterian system, and had voted to replace the Book of Common Prayer with the Directory of Public Worship. The actual implementation of these reforms in the church proceeded slowly for a number of reasons:

- In many localities – especially those areas which had been Royalist during the Civil Wars and which had low numbers of Puritans, both the bishops and the Book of Common Prayer were popular, and ministers, as well as their congregations, simply continued to conduct worship in their ordinary way.
- Independents opposed the scheme, and started conducting themselves as gathered churches.
- Clergymen who favored presbyterianism nevertheless disliked the Long Parliament's ordinance because it included an Erastian element in the office of "commissioner". Some were thus less than enthusiastic about implementing the Long Parliament's scheme.
- Since the office of bishop had been abolished in the church, with no substitute, there was no one to enforce the new presbyterianism scheme on the church, so the combination of opposition and apathy meant that little was done.

With the abolition of the Act of Uniformity, even the pretense of religious uniformity broke down. Thus, while the Presbyterians were dominant (at least theoretically) within the established church, those who opposed Presbyterianism were in fact free to start conducting themselves in the way they wanted. Separatists, who had previously organized themselves underground, were able to worship openly. For example, as early as 1616, the first English Baptists had organized themselves in secret, under the leadership of Henry Jacob, John Lothropp, and Henry Jessey. Now, however, they were less secretive. Other ministers – who favored the congregationalist New England Way – also began setting up their own congregations outside of the established church.

Many sects were also organized during this time. It is not clear that they should be called "Puritan" sects since they placed less emphasis on the Bible than is characteristic of Puritans, instead insisting on the role of direct contact with the Holy Spirit. These groups included the Ranters, the Fifth Monarchists, the Seekers, the Muggletonians, and – most prominently and most lastingly – the Quakers.

=== Religious controversies of the Interregnum ===
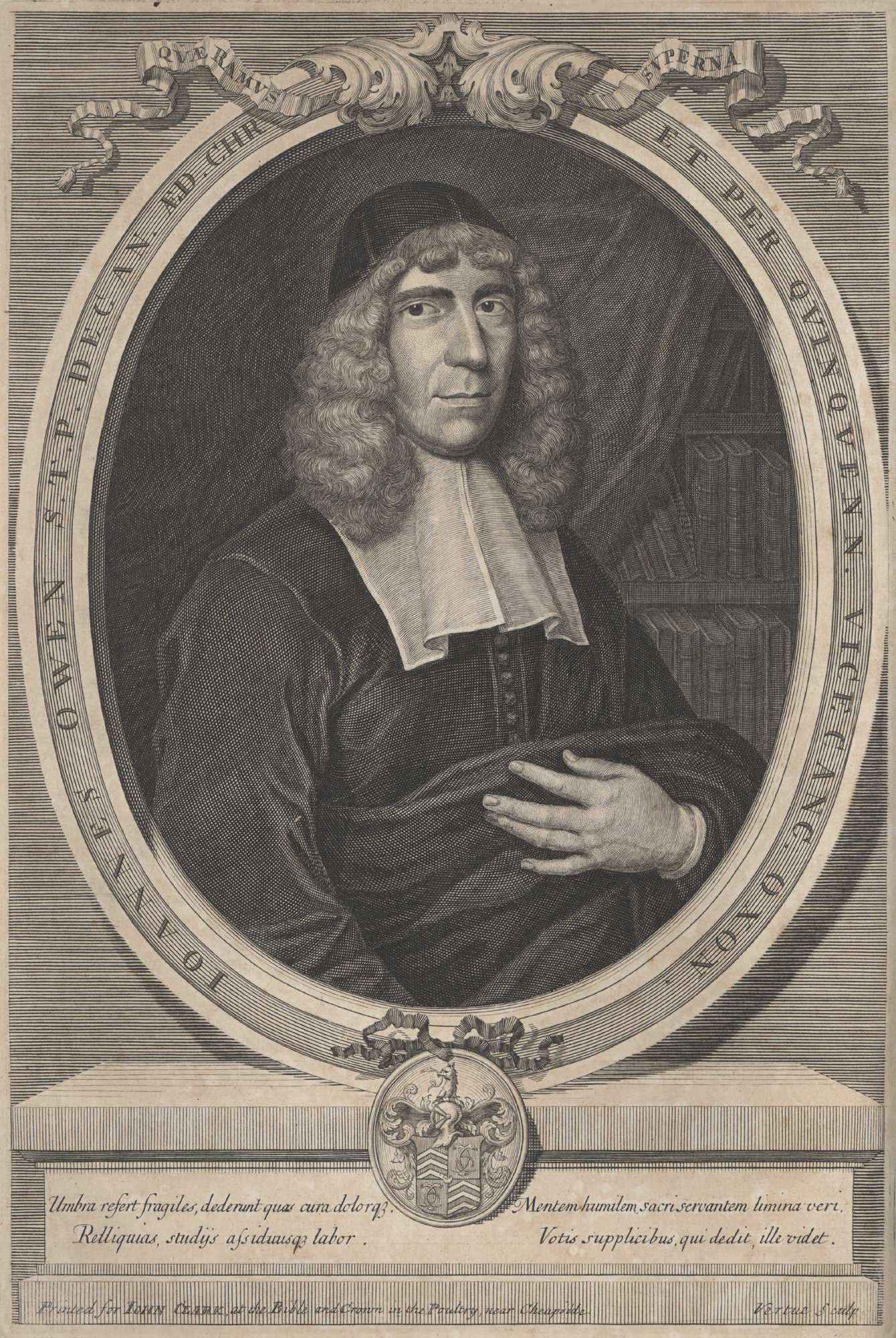
John Owen (1616–1683), whom Cromwell named vice-chancellor of the University of Oxford in 1651 and who was considered by many to be the leader of the Independents in the 1650s.

The Puritan movement split over issues of ecclesiology in the course of the Westminster Assembly. In the course of the 1650s, the movement became further split in the course of a number of controversies. With no means to enforce uniformity in the church and with freedom of the press, these disputes were largely played out in pamphlet warfare throughout the decade.

==== Owen–Baxter Debate over the nature of Justification ====
In 1647, John Owen, the pastor of Coggeshall, Essex, a man who was a champion of congregationalism, who had preached to the Long Parliament, and who had published a number of works denouncing Arminianism, published his work The Death of Death in the Death of Christ. In this work, he denounced the Arminian doctrine of the unlimited atonement and argued in favour of the doctrine of a limited atonement. He also denounced the spread of Amyraldism in England, a position most associated with John Davenant, Samuel Ward and their followers.

In 1649, Richard Baxter, the minister of Kidderminster, Worcestershire and who served as chaplain to Colonel Edward Whalley's regiment, published a reply to Owen, entitled Aphorisms of Justification. He argued that the doctrine of unlimited atonement was more faithful to the words of scripture. He invoked the authority of dozens of the Reformers, including John Calvin, in support of his position.

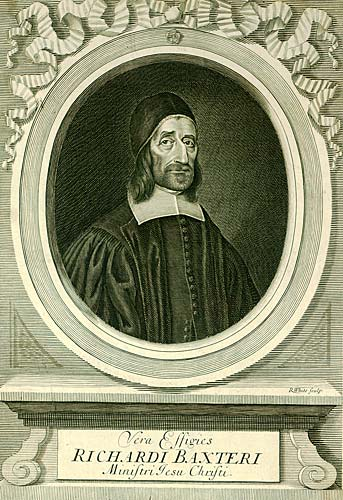
Richard Baxter (1615-1691), the minister of Kidderminster whom Dean Stanley called "the Chief of English Protestant Schoolmen." In the course of the 1650s, he came to be seen as the leader of the Presbyterians, the largest Puritan faction.

In the course of the 1650s, Owen and Baxter engaged in a series of replies and counter-replies on the topic. At the same time, both men gained followers for their positions. John Owen preached to the Long Parliament the day after the execution of Charles I, and then accompanied Oliver Cromwell to Ireland. Cromwell charged Owen with reforming Trinity College, Dublin. In 1651, after the Presbyterian Vice-Chancellor of the University of Oxford, Edward Reynolds, refused to take the Engagement, Cromwell appointed Owen as vice-chancellor in his stead. From that post, Owen became the most prominent Independent churchman of the 1650s.

Baxter also gained a following in the 1650s, publishing prolifically after his return to Kidderminster. Two of his books – The Saints' Everlasting Rest (1650) and The Reformed Pastor (1656) – have been regarded by subsequent generations as Puritan classics. Many clergymen came to see Baxter as the leader of the Presbyterians, the largest party of Puritans, in the course of the 1650s.

==== Socinian controversy ====
Socinianism, an anti-trinitarian position, had made a few in-roads into England in the late sixteenth and early seventeenth centuries. Adherents of this position had been brutally oppressed, with a number of high-profile executions, including that of Francis Kett in 1589, and Bartholomew Legate and Edward Wightman in 1612, after they in 1609 published a Latin version of the Racovian Catechism.

The most prominent Socinian of the 1650s was John Biddle, often known as the "Father of English Unitarianism." Biddle was imprisoned in 1645 and 1646 for publicizing his denials of the Trinity. After being defended in the Long Parliament by Henry Vane the Younger, Biddle was released in 1648. In 1652, he was arrested again after he published an anti-trinitarian catechism. John Owen produced several pieces denouncing Biddle's views. However, Cromwell, true to his principle of religious liberty, intervened to ensure that Biddle was not executed, but instead sent to exile on the Isles of Scilly in 1652.

== From 1660 to present day ==
=== Puritans and the Restoration, 1660 ===
The largest Puritan faction – the Presbyterians – had been deeply dissatisfied with the state of the church under Cromwell. They wanted to restore religious uniformity throughout England and they believed that only a restoration of the English monarchy could achieve this and suppress the sectaries. Most Presbyterians were therefore supportive of the Restoration of Charles II. Charles II's most loyal followers – those who had followed him into exile on the continent, like Sir Edward Hyde – had fought the English Civil War largely in defense of episcopacy and insisted that episcopacy be restored in the Church of England. Nevertheless, in the Declaration of Breda, issued in April 1660, a month before Charles II's return to England, Charles II proclaimed that while he intended to restore the Church of England, he would also pursue a policy of religious toleration for non-adherents of the Church of England. Charles II named the only living pre-Civil War bishop William Juxon as Archbishop of Canterbury in 1660, but it was widely understood that because of Juxon's age, he would likely die soon and be replaced by Gilbert Sheldon, who, for the time being, became Bishop of London. In a show of goodwill, one of the chief Presbyterians, Edward Reynolds, was named Bishop of Norwich and chaplain to the king.

Shortly after Charles II's return to England, in early 1661, Fifth Monarchists Vavasor Powell and Thomas Venner attempted a coup against Charles II. Thus, elections were held for the Cavalier Parliament in a heated atmosphere of anxiety about a further Puritan uprising.

Nevertheless, Charles II had hoped that the Book of Common Prayer could be reformed in a way that was acceptable to the majority of the Presbyterians, so that when religious uniformity was restored by law, the largest number of Puritans possible could be incorporated inside the Church of England. At the April 1661 Savoy Conference, held at Gilbert Sheldon's chambers at Savoy Hospital, twelve bishops and twelve representatives of the Presbyterian party (Edward Reynolds, Anthony Tuckney, John Conant, William Spurstowe, John Wallis, Thomas Manton, Edmund Calamy, Richard Baxter, Arthur Jackson, Thomas Case, and Matthew Newcomen) met to discuss Presbyterian proposals for reforming the Book of Common Prayer drawn up by Richard Baxter. Baxter's proposed liturgy was largely rejected at the Conference.

When the Cavalier Parliament met in May 1661, its first action, largely a reaction to the Fifth Monarchist uprising, was to pass the Corporation Act 1661, which barred anyone who had not received communion in the Church of England in the past twelve months from holding office in a city or corporation. It also required officeholders to swear the Oath of Allegiance and Oath of Supremacy, to swear belief in the Doctrine of Passive Obedience, and to renounce the Covenant.

=== The Great Ejection, 1662 ===
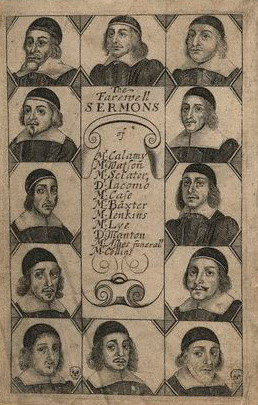
Title page of a collection of Farewell Sermons preached by ministers ejected from their parishes in 1662.

In 1662, the Cavalier Parliament passed the Act of Uniformity of 1662, restoring the Book of Common Prayer as the official liturgy under the 1662 prayer book. The Act of Uniformity prescribed that any minister who refused to conform to the Book of Common Prayer by St. Bartholomew's Day 1662 would be ejected from the Church of England. This date became known as Black Bartholomew's Day, among dissenters, a reference to the fact that it occurred on the same day as the St. Bartholomew's Day massacre of 1572.

The majority of ministers who had served in Cromwell's state church conformed to the Book of Common Prayer. Members of Cromwell's state church who chose to conform in 1662 were often labeled Latitudinarians by contemporaries – this group includes John Tillotson, Simon Patrick, Thomas Tenison, William Lloyd, Joseph Glanvill, and Edward Fowler. The Latitudinarians formed the basis of what would later become the Low church wing of the Church of England. The Puritan movement had become particularly fractured in the course of the 1640s and 1650s, and with the decision of the Latitudinarians to conform in 1662, it became even further fractured.

Around two thousand Puritan ministers resigned from their positions as Church of England clergy as a consequence. This group included Richard Baxter, Edmund Calamy the Elder, Simeon Ashe, Thomas Case, William Jenkyn, Thomas Manton, William Sclater, and Thomas Watson. After 1662, the term "Puritan" was generally supplanted by "Nonconformist" or "Dissenter" to describe those Puritans who had refused to conform in 1662.

=== Persecution of Dissenters, 1662–1672 ===
Though expelled from their pulpits in 1662, many of the non-conforming ministers continued to preach to their followers in public homes and other locations. These private meetings were known as conventicles. The congregations that they formed around the non-conforming ministers at this time form the nucleus for the later English Presbyterian, Congregationalist, and Baptist denominations. The Cavalier Parliament responded hostilely to the continued influence of the non-conforming ministers. In 1664, it passed the Conventicle Act banning religious assemblies of more than five people outside of the Church of England. In 1665, it passed the Five Mile Act, forbidding ejected ministers from living within five miles of a parish from which they had been banned, unless they swore an oath never to resist the king, or attempt to alter the government of Church or State. Under the penal laws forbidding religious dissent (generally known to history as the Clarendon Code), many ministers were imprisoned in the latter half of the 1660s. One of the most notable victims of the penal laws during this period (though he was not himself an ejected minister) was John Bunyan, a Baptist, who was imprisoned from 1660 to 1672.

At the same time that the Cavalier Parliament was ratcheting up the legal penalties against religious dissent, there were various attempts from the side of government and bishops to establish a basis for "comprehension", a set of circumstances under which some dissenting ministers could return to the Church of England. These schemes for comprehension would have driven a wedge between Presbyterians and the group of Independents, but the discussions that took place between Latitudinarian figures in the Church and leaders such as Baxter and Manton never bridged the gap between Dissenters and the "high church" party in the Church of England, and comprehension ultimately proved impossible to achieve.

There were also various attempts to ease the penal laws. These attempts were generally motivated by a desire to ease the position of the Roman Catholics, rather than the Protestant dissenters. In 1662, Charles II issued a Declaration of Indulgence that would have suspended the penal laws against both Protestant dissenters and Roman Catholics, but the Cavalier Parliament refused to allow it to take effect.

=== The Road to Religious Toleration for the Dissenters, 1672–1689 ===
In 1670, Charles II had signed the Secret Treaty of Dover with Louis XIV of France. In this treaty he committed to securing religious toleration for the Roman Catholic recusants in England. In March 1672, Charles issued his Royal Declaration of Indulgence, which suspended the penal laws against the dissenters and eased restrictions on the private practice of Catholicism. Many imprisoned dissenters (including John Bunyan) were released from prison in response to the Royal Declaration of Indulgence.

The Cavalier Parliament reacted hostilely to the Royal Declaration of Indulgence. Supporters of the high church party in the Church of England resented the easing of the penal laws, while many across the political nation suspected that Charles II was plotting to restore Catholicism to England. The Cavalier Parliament's hostility forced Charles to withdraw the declaration of indulgence, and the penal laws were again enforceable. In 1673, Parliament passed the first Test Act, requiring all officeholders in England to abjure the doctrine of transubstantiation (thus ensuring that no Catholics could hold office in England).

=== Later trends ===
Puritan experience underlay the later Latitudinarian and Evangelical trends in the Church of England. Divisions between Presbyterian and Congregationalist groups in London became clear in the 1690s, and with the Congregationalists following the trend of the older Independents, a split became perpetuated. The Salters' Hall conference of 1719 was a landmark, after which many of the congregations went their own way in theology. In Europe, in the 17th and 18th centuries, a movement within Lutheranism parallel to puritan ideology (which was mostly of a Calvinist orientation) became a strong religious force known as pietism. In the United States, the Puritan settlement of New England was a major influence on American Protestantism.

With the start of the English Civil War in 1642, fewer settlers to New England were Puritans. The period of 1642 to 1659 represented a period of peaceful dominance in English life by the formerly discriminated Puritan population. Consequently, most felt no need to settle in the American colonies. Very few immigrants to the Colony of Virginia and other early colonies, in any case, were Puritans. Virginia was a repository for more middle class and "royalist" oriented settlers, who were leaving England following their loss of power during the English Commonwealth. Many migrants to New England who had looked for greater religious freedom found the Puritan theocracy to be repressive, examples being Roger Williams, Stephen Bachiler, Anne Hutchinson, and Mary Dyer. Puritan populations in New England, continued to grow, with many large and prosperous Puritan families. (See Estimated Population 1620–1780: Immigration to the United States.)

== Bibliography ==
- Coffey, John; Lim, Paul C. H. (2008). The Cambridge Companion to Puritanism. Cambridge: Cambridge University Press. doi:10.1017/CCOL9780521860888.
- Cooper, Tim (2017). "Richard Baxter and the Savoy Conference (1661)". Journal of Ecclesiastical History. 68 (2): 326–339. doi:10.1017/S0022046916001482.
- Dzelzainis, Martin (2017). "Milton, Sir Henry Vane the Younger, and the Toleration of Catholics". In Corthell, Ronald; Corns, Thomas N. (eds.). Milton and Catholicism. Notre Dame: University of Notre Dame Press. pp. 207–228. doi:10.2307/j.ctvpg84r5.7.
- Duffy, Eamon (2003). "The Reformed Pastor in English Puritanism". Nederlands Archief voor Kerkgeschiedenis / Dutch Review of Church History. 83. Brill: 216–234.
- Fincham, Kenneth; Taylor, Stephen (2023). "The English Presbyterian Conundrum of 1660–1". Seventeenth Century. 38 (4): 1–24. doi:10.1080/0268117X.2023.2276601.
- Gaines, A. V. (2021). The Problem of Church Government and Emergent Presbyterianism in the Long Parliament, 1640–1643 (Thesis). University of York.
- Green, Ian M. (1978). The Re-Establishment of the Church of England 1660–1663. Oxford: Oxford University Press. ISBN 978-0-19-821867-8.
- Harris, K. (2021). Religious Tolerance and Anti-Trinitarianism: The Influence of Socinianism on English and American Leaders and the Separation of Church and State (Thesis). University of Richmond.
- Hessayon, Ariel; Lucci, Diego (2022). "The Supposed Burning of the Racovian Catechism in 1614: A Historiographical Myth Exposed". History. 107 (374): 25–50. doi:10.1111/1468-229X.13197.
- Hitchcock, David (2018). "'He is the Vagabond that Hath No Habitation in the Lord': The Representation of Quakerism as Vagrancy in Interregnum England, c. 1650–1660". Cultural and Social History. 15 (3): 297–314. doi:10.1080/14780038.2018.1427340.
- Hutton, Ronald (1986). "The Making of the Secret Treaty of Dover, 1668–1670". The Historical Journal. 29 (2): 297–318. doi:10.1017/S0018246X00018756.
- Jessey, Henry; Tombes, John (1979). "Letters of Henry Jessey and John Tombes to the Churches of New England, 1645". Baptist Quarterly. 28 (1): 30–40. doi:10.1080/0005576X.1979.11751514.
- Keeble, N. H. (1982). Richard Baxter: Puritan Man of Letters. Oxford: Clarendon Press. ISBN 978-0-19-811716-2.
- Lynch, Michael J. (2021). John Davenant's Hypothetical Universalism: A Defense of Catholic and Reformed Orthodoxy. Oxford: Oxford University Press. ISBN 978-0-19-755514-9.
- Matthews, A. G. (1934). Calamy Revised, Being a Revision of Edmund Calamy's Account of the Ministers and Others Ejected and Silenced, 1660–2. Oxford: Clarendon Press.
- Mullett, C. F. (1949). "Toleration and Persecution in England, 1660–89". Church History. 18 (1): 18–43. doi:10.2307/3161055.
- Naselli, Andrew David (2010). "John Owen's Argument for Definite Atonement in The Death of Death in the Death of Christ: A Summary and Evaluation" (PDF). Southern Baptist Journal of Theology. 14 (4): 60–82.
- Seaward, Paul (1989). The Cavalier Parliament and the Reconstruction of the Old Regime, 1661–1667. Cambridge: Cambridge University Press. ISBN 9780521531313.
- Shilston, T. G. (2012). "Thomas Venner: Fifth Monarchist or Maverick?". Social History. 37 (1): 55–64. doi:10.1080/03071022.2011.651584.
- Sparkes, D. C. (1973). "The Test Act of 1673 and its Aftermath". Baptist Quarterly. 25 (2): 74–85. doi:10.1080/0005576X.1973.11751389.
- Spurr, John (1996). "From Puritanism to Dissent, 1660–1700". In Durston, Christopher; Eales, Jacqueline (eds.). The Culture of English Puritanism, 1560–1700. London: Macmillan. pp. 234–265. doi:10.1007/978-1-349-24437-9_9.
- Spurr, John (1988). "'Latitudinarianism' and the Restoration Church". The Historical Journal. 31 (1): 61–82. JSTOR 2639237.
- Stoeffler, F. Ernest (1973). German Pietism during the Eighteenth Century. Leiden: Brill. ISBN 9789004378421.
- Thomas, R. (1953). "The Non-Subscription Controversy amongst Dissenters in 1719: The Salters' Hall Debate". Journal of Ecclesiastical History. 4 (2): 162–186. doi:10.1017/S0022046900063600.
- Toon, Peter (1971). God's Statesman: The Life and Work of John Owen, Pastor, Educator, Theologian. Exeter: Paternoster Press. ISBN 978-1532643873.
- Wallace, Dewey D., Jr. (1974). "From Eschatology to Arian Heresy: The Case of Francis Kett (d. 1589)". Harvard Theological Review. 67 (4): 459–473. doi:10.1017/S0017816000016928.
- Wang, Cecelia (2024). "Edward Reynolds and the Making of a Presbyterian Bishop". In Fincham, Kenneth (ed.). Conformity and Orthodoxy in the English Church, c. 1560–1660. Manchester: Manchester University Press. doi:10.7765/9781526167989.00017.
- Worden, Blair (1977). The Rump Parliament 1648–53. Cambridge: Cambridge University Press. doi:10.1017/CBO9780511560910. ISBN 9780511560910.
