= Edward Lawrence (minister) =

English minister

Edward Lawrence or Laurence (1623 – November 1695) was an English ejected minister.

== Life ==
The son of William Laurence, he was born in 1623 at Moston, Shropshire. He was educated first in the school at Whitchurch in the same county, and was then admitted as a sizar of Magdalene College, Cambridge on 8 June 1644. He matriculated in 1645, graduated BA in 1647-8, and MA in 1654.

After preaching for a time, in 1648 Lawrence was made vicar of Baschurch in Shropshire, near his native place. Declining offers of preferment, he remained there till 1662, when he was ejected under the Act of Uniformity. After his ejection he resided with a gentleman in the parish of Baschurch until March 1666, when the Five Mile Act necessitated a move, and he settled at Tilstock, a village in the area of Whitchurch.

In February 1667-8 Lawrence and his friend Philip Henry were invited to Betley in Staffordshire, where they preached in the church. The incident was reported in the House of Commons, and with others of a similar nature provoked a proclamation against papists and nonconformists (18 February 1668). In May 1670, when living at Whitchurch, and preaching one Sunday afternoon at the house of a neighbour to his family and four friends, he was arrested by Dr Fowler, the minister of Whitchurch, under the Conventicle Act. Lawrence and four others were fined. This affair caused Lawrence to take his family to London in May 1671, where he remained, preaching in his meetinghouse near the Royal Exchange and elsewhere.

Lawrence died in November 1695, known as a minister troubled at the divisions of the church. He is often mentioned in Philip Henry's diary. Samuel Lawrence of Nantwich was his nephew.

== Works ==
Lawrence published:

- 'Christ's Power over Bodily Diseases,' preached in several sermons on Matt. viii. 5-13, London, 1662; 2nd edit. 1672. Richard Baxter wrote a preface.
- 'There is no Transubstantiation in the Lord's Supper,' delivered as a morning lecture at Southwark, and published as Sermon xxi in The Morning Exercise against Popery (cf. edition by James Nichols, 1845, vol. vi.), first issued by Nathaniel Vincent, London, 1675. An abstract of the sermon, with a notice of Lawrence, is in Samuel Dunn's Seventy-five Eminent Divines, pp. 222–3.
- 'Parents' Groans over their Wicked Children,' several sermons on Prov. xvii. 25, London, 1681.
- Two funeral sermons on the 'Use and Happiness of Human Bodies,' London, 1690.

== Family ==
Edward and Deborah Lawrence recorded the baptisms of eight children at Baschurch, between 1649 and 1661. The conduct of two of his children caused Lawrence distress. Nathaniel, born 28 April 1670, became nonconformist minister at Banbury.

== Notes ==
Attribution

This article incorporates text from a publication now in the public domain: Lee, Sidney, ed. (1891). "Lawrence, Edward". Dictionary of National Biography. Vol. 27. London: Smith, Elder & Co.
