= Benjamin Needler =

English ejected minister

Benjamin Needler (1620–1682) was an English ejected minister.

== Life ==
The son of Thomas Needler, of Laleham, Middlesex, he was born on 29 November 1620. He was admitted to Merchant Taylors' School on 11 September 1634, and was elected to St John's College, Oxford, on 11 June 1642, matriculating on 1 July. He was elected fellow of his college in 1645, but appears to have been non-resident, as his submission is not registered.

Joining the presbyterian party, he was summoned to assist the parliamentary visitors of the university in 1648, and was by them created B.C.L. on 14 April of the same year. On 8 August he was appointed to the rectory of St. Margaret Moses, Friday Street, London. It is not known whether he was ordained into episcopal orders or not. He was one of the ministers in London who in January 1648–9 signed the Serious and Faithful Representation to General Thomas Fairfax, petitioning for the life of King Charles I and the maintenance of parliament.

In August 1662 Needler was ejected from his rectory by the Act of Uniformity. He went to North Warnborough in Hampshire, where he preached privately till the time of his death. He was buried at Odiham, near Winchfield, on 20 October 1682.

== Works ==
Needler published Expository Notes with Practical Observations towards the opening of the five first Chapters of Genesis, London, 1655. He also wrote three sermons which are reprinted in editions of Morning Exercises (cf. those of 1660, 1661, 1675, 1676, 1677, and 1844). He also wrote some verses on the death of Jeremiah Whitaker, published in Simon Ashe's funeral sermon on Whitaker, Living Loves between Christ and Dying Christians, London, 1654.

== Family ==
On his marriage in 1651 with Marie, sister of Nathanael Culverwell, Needler resigned his fellowship at St. John's College. They had children, and the baptisms of six are recorded in the registers of St. Margaret Moses between January 1651–2 and May 1662, and the burials of two of them in 1658 and 1659 respectively.

Culverwell Needler (fl. 1710), a son, (baptised 5 March 1656 at St. Margaret Moses), was appointed additional writing clerk to the House of Lords on 25 March 1679, and later on clerk-assistant to the House of Commons, a post he retained till December 1710, when he was disabled by palsy. He published Debates of the House of Commons in January 1704, London, 1721 (2nd ed.)

== Notes ==
Attribution

This article incorporates text from a publication now in the public domain: Lee, Sidney, ed. (1894). "Needler, Benjamin". Dictionary of National Biography. Vol. 40. London: Smith, Elder & Co.
