= William Whitaker (Puritan ejected minister) =

English minister (1629–1672)

William Whitaker (1629–1672) was an English Puritan ejected minister.

== Life ==
The son of Jeremiah Whitaker, he was born at Oakham, Rutland. Aged 14 he was admitted a member of Emmanuel College, Cambridge, where he became noted as a linguist. He took the degree of B.A. in 1642. Two years later he was admitted a Fellow of Queens' College, Cambridge, and in 1646 he graduated M.A. there.

In 1652 he took orders and became minister of Hornchurch, Essex. He succeeded his father in the living of St Mary Magdalen, Bermondsey, in 1654. After the Restoration of 1660 he was one of the London ministers who drew up and presented to the king the memorial against the Act of Uniformity 1662.

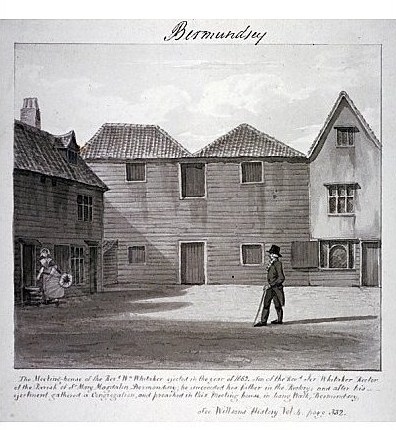
The meeting-house in Long Walk, Bermondsey, engraving from the early 19th century by John Chessell Buckler.

After his ejectment he gathered a private congregation, which assembled in a small meeting-house in Long Walk, Bermondsey. For many years he took into his house candidates in divinity, including some from abroad. He also took part in conventicles at the house of Frances Cecil, Dowager Countess of Exeter (née Brydges, widow of Thomas Cecil, 1st Earl of Exeter, who died in 1663), with her chaplain Thomas Jacomb and Matthew Poole.

Samuel Annesley preached his funeral sermon.

== Works ==
He has two sermons in Samuel Annesley's Morning Exercises. In 1674 eighteen of his sermons, which had been taken in shorthand, were published by his widow, with a dedication to Elizabeth Cecil, Countess of Exeter, and a sketch of the author's character by Thomas Jacomb.

== Notes ==
Attribution:

- This article incorporates text from a publication now in the public domain: Cooper, Thompson (1900). "Whitaker, William (1629–1672)". In Lee, Sidney (ed.). Dictionary of National Biography. Vol. 61. London: Smith, Elder & Co. p. 23.
