= Bromhall =

Bromhall may refer to:

- Bromhall Priory
- Andrew Bromhall
- Broomhall, Cheshire, also known historically as Bromhall

== See also ==
- Broomhall (disambiguation)
