= Thomas Cole (minister) =

Thomas Cole (1628–1697) was an English Independent minister.

== Life ==
Cole was a native of London, born in 1628. His father William Cole owned property, and sent him to Westminster School, from where, in 1646, he was elected student of Christ Church, Oxford. He proceeded B.A. in 1649, and M.A. 8 July 1651, and in 1656 became principal of St. Mary Hall. As a tutor he had pupils including John Locke.

The Restoration of Charles II led to the ejection of Cole from his position at Oxford. He then opened a dissenting academy at Nettlebed, Oxfordshire, where one of those under his charge was James Bonnell. Samuel Wesley attacked the character of Cole, based on reports from Bonnell; Samuel Palmer defended Cole in his Vindication of the Dissenters.

In February 1674 Cole succeeded Philip Nye as minister of the Independent congregation at Silver Street meeting-house, London. He was also one of the ministers of the merchants' lecture at Pinners' Hall. His church, after leaving Silver Street, met at Tallow Chandlers' Hall, Dowgate Hill, and then at Pinners' Hall, where he preached his last sermon 22 August 1697.

Cole was buried in the upper ground of Bunhill Fields, but the precise spot is not known.

== Works ==
As well as three sermons in the Morning Exercises, 1674, and one in the Casuistical Morning Exercise, 1690, his writings are:

- The old Apostolical Way of Preaching: a funeral sermon for Rev. Edward West, London, 1676.
- Discourses on Regeneration, Faith, and Repentance, London, 1689.
- The Incomprehensibleness of imputed Righteousness for Justification by Human Reason, till enlightened by the Spirit of God, London, 1692.
- Discourses on the Christian Religion, London, 1700.

A manuscript copy of some of his sermons, including his last, with an account of his deathbed conversation, is described by Walter Wilson. Verses by him were prefixed to William Cartwright's poems in 1653, and there is another poem in the Oxford collection on the peace in 1654.
