= John Langston (dissenter) =

John Langston (ca 1641 – 12 January 1704) was a dissenting minister educationalist active following the Stuart restoration and the test acts. He was a curate at Ashchurch near Tewkesbury, but was ejected in 1690. as part of the Great Ejection following the Savoy Conference.

== Publications ==
- (1675) Lusus poeticus Latino-Anglicanus in usum scholarum London: printed for Henry Eversden at the Crown in Cornhil, near the Stocks-market.
