= Gilbert Primrose =

Gilbert Primrose may refer to:

- Gilbert Primrose (minister) (c. 1580–1641), Scottish Calvinist minister
- Gilbert Primrose (surgeon) (c. 1535–1616), Scottish surgeon
- Gilbert E. Primrose (1848–1935), Scottish amateur footballer
