= James Ashurst =

James Ashurst (died 1679), was an English divine who lost his living in the Great Ejection of 1662.

== Biography ==
Ashurst was vicar of Arlesey, in Bedfordshire, and had been episcopally ordained, but he could not comply with the new impositions of the Act of Uniformity, and hence quit his living. He was very old, and his vicarage slender. Samuel Browne, the judge, was one of his parishioners, and a great friend. "The whole parish", says Palmer (after Calamy),

was well affected towards him for his worthy behaviour amongst them, and was entirely under the influence of the judge . . . and so, though he was legally silenced, he continued in his church a non-conformist. He read part of the morning and evening service, viz. the confession, scripture-hymns, the creed, and some of the collects. He was a considerable scholar and a hard student to the last; greatly esteemed and loved by all sober persons who knew him, for his extraordinary piety, humility, meekness, self-denial, and integrity. His contempt of the world and contentedness on a very small income were very remarkable. He took for his small tithes just what his parishioners were pleased to give him.

From the register-book of births, deaths, and marriages of the Parish of Arlesey, it is found that Ashurst became vicar between 27 October 1631 and 4 October 1632, and that he was married to Mary Baldocke, widow of Daniel Baldocke, on 20 November 1660. The same register states that James Ashurst, minister, was buried 16 December 1679 ("buried in woolen"). His neighbour, Read, of Henlow, preached his funeral sermon.
