= Roger Drake (physician) =

English physician (1608–1669)

Roger Drake (1608–1669) was an English physician, and a minister of strong Presbyterian convictions.

== Life ==
He was the eldest son of Roger Drake, a wealthy mercer of Cheapside, who died in December 1651. The preacher Richard Drake was his brother.

He received his education at Pembroke College, Cambridge, as a member of which he graduated B.A. in 1628, and M.A. in 1631. At thirty years of age he entered himself as a medical student at Leyden in 1638 and attended the lectures of Adolph Vorstius, Otto Heurnius, and Johannes Walaeus. He proceeded doctor of medicine there in 1639. In his inaugural dissertation he defended William Harvey's theory of the circulation of the blood, and was subjected to an attack by Dr. James Primrose the following year; Drake replied.

Drake appears to have been incorporated a doctor of medicine at Cambridge, and was admitted a candidate of the College of Physicians on 22 December 1643. He resigned his candidateship 27 November 1646, having resolved to enter the ministry.

A rigid Presbyterian, he was implicated in Christopher Love's plot, and was arrested by order of the council of state, 7 May 1651. With some ten or twelve others, he was pardoned for life and estate without undergoing a trial, after an outside intervention. Drake became minister of St. Peter's Cheap in 1653, was one of the intended commissioners at the Savoy conference (though did not attend after an administrative mistake), and occasionally conducted the morning exercise at St. Giles-in-the-Fields and that at Cripplegate. Towards the close of his life he lived at Stepney, where he died in the summer of 1669. Samuel Annesley preached his funeral sermon and praised his chronological writings, returning to Drake in 1673 in the preface to his sermon on William Whitaker.

== Works ==
His other medical writings are Disputatio de Convulsione, Leyden, 1640, and Disputationum sexta, de Tremore Leyden, 1640.

Drake was author of these religious works:

- Sacred Chronologie, drawn by Scripture Evidence al-along that vast body of time . . . from the Creation of the World to the Passion of our Blessed Saviour: by the help of which alone sundry difficult places of Scripture are unfolded, London, 1648.
- A Boundary to the Holy Mount; or a Barre against Free Admission to the Lord's Supper, in Answer to an Humble Vindication of Free Admission to the Lord's Supper published by Mr. Humphrey, London, 1653. A Rejoynder, by John Humfrey, was published the following year, as also an answer by John Timson, The Bar to Free Admission to the Lord's Supper removed.
- A practicall commentary, with John Cotton and Christopher Fowler (1655)
- The Bar against Free Admission to the Lord's Supper fixed; or, an Answer to Mr. Humphrey, his Rejoynder, or Reply, London, 1656.
- The Believer's Dignity and Duty laid Open (sermon on John i. 12, 13), at pp. 433–54 of Thomas Case's The Morning Exercise at St. Giles-in-the-Fields metho-dized, London, 1660.
- What difference is there between the Conflict in Natural and Spiritual Persons? (sermon on Rom. vii. 23), at pp. 271–9 of Samuel Annesley's The Morning Exercise at Cripplegate, London, 1677, and in vol. i. of the 1844 edition.
