= Thomas Manton =

Thomas Manton may refer to:

- Thomas Manton (minister) (1620–1677), English Puritan clergyman
- Thomas Manton (politician) (1932–2006), American politician
