= John Langston =

John Langston may refer to:

- John Langston (dissenter), English dissenter
- John Langston (MP) (c. 1758–1812), English merchant banker and politician, Member of Parliament (MP) 1784–1807
- John Mercer Langston (1829–1897), American abolitionist, attorney, educator, activist, diplomat, and politician, first dean of the law school at Howard University

== See also ==
- John Lankston, American tenor
