= Thomas Jacomb =

English ejected minister (1622–1687)

Thomas Jacomb (1622–1687) was an English ejected minister.

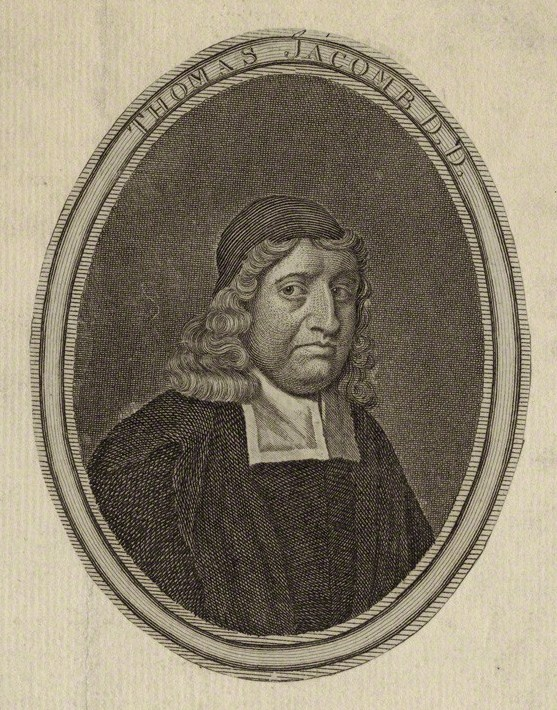
Thomas Jacomb

== Life ==
He was the son of John Jacombe of Burton Lazars, near Melton Mowbray, Leicestershire. He was educated at Melton free school, and for two years under Edward Gamble at Newark grammar school. He matriculated at Magdalen Hall, Oxford, in the Easter term, 1640; and when the First English Civil War broke out moved to St John's College, Cambridge (28 October 1642), where he graduated B.A. in 1643. Shortly afterwards he signed the covenant, and became a fellow of Trinity College in place of an ejected royalist.

Jacomb completed his M.A. in 1647. In the same year he took Presbyterian orders, became chaplain to the Countess-dowager of Exeter, widow of David Cecil, 3rd Earl of Exeter; he held this post for the rest of his life. He also received the living of St. Martin's, Ludgate Hill, on the sequestration of Dr. Michael Jermyn. He was appointed by parliament an assistant to the London commissioners for ejecting insufficient ministers and schoolmasters, and in 1659 he was made one of the triers of ministers.

Jacomb's opinions, however, were moderate, and on the Restoration he was created D.D. at Cambridge by royal mandate dated 19 November 1660, along with two other Presbyterian ministers, William Bates and Robert Wilde. He was named on the royal commission for the review of the prayer-book (25 March 1661), and was treated respectfully at the meetings. He was on the Presbyterian side, and took a leading part in drawing up the exceptions against the Book of Common Prayer. Samuel Pepys heard him preach on 14 April 1661 and 16 February 1661. He was ejected for nonconformity in 1662.

After losing his job, Jacomb held a conventicle from 1672 in Silver Street, and was several times prosecuted. He was protected by his patroness the Countess-dowager of Exeter. He went to live in her house in Little Britain in February 1685. He died there of a cancer, aged 66, on Easter Sunday, 27 March 1687. He was buried on 3 April at St. Anne's, Aldersgate, with a large number of conforming and nonconforming ministers attending his funeral. The sermon was preached by William Bates. He had collected a library that sold after his death for £1,300. Samuel Rolle in his Prodromus speaks of Jacomb as a person of "high repute for good life, learning, and excellent gravity". Pepys was pleased by his preaching.

== Family ==
His brother Samuel Jacomb (1622 - 1659) was also a Puritan minister and popular preacher.

== Works ==
Jacomb's main works are:

- Enoch's Walk and Change: Funeral Sermon and Life of Mr. Vines, sometime Master of Pembroke Hall, Cambridge, preached at St. Laurence Jewry on 7 Feb. 1655–6, London, 1656.
- The active and publick spirit
- A Treatise of Holy Dedication, both personal and domestic, recommended to the Citizens of London on entering into their new Habitations after the Great Fire, London, 1668.
- Several Sermons, or Commentary preached on the whole 8th Chapter of Romans, London, 1672.
- How Christians may learn in every way to be content, in the supplement to the Morning Exercise at Cripplegate, London, 1674, and enlarged 1683; republished, first by John Rees in the Crown Street Chapel Tracts (1827), and in a collection of sermons preached by nonconformists between 1659 and 1689, The Morning Exercises by James Nicholls, London (1844).
- A Short Account of W. Whitaker, late Minister of St. Mary Magdalen, Bermondsey, prefixed to his Eighteen Sermons, London, 1674.
- The Covenant of Redemption opened, or the Morning Exercise methodized, preached at St. Giles'-in-the-Fields, May 1659, London, 1676.
- The Upright Man's Peace at his end, preached at Matthew Martin's funeral, London, 1682.
- Abraham's Death, at Thomas Case's funeral, London, 1682.
- Gods mercy for mans mercy

Jacombe subscribed his name to a letter against the Quakers, which called forth a pamphlet by William Penn, entitled A Just Rebuke to one-and-twenty learned Divines (so called) …, London, 1674. His two farewell sermons, preached on 17 August 1662, were published separately with a portrait (1662), again in a collection of other sermons, entitled The London Ministers' Legacy (1662), and in Farewell Sermons of some of the most eminent of the Nonconformist Ministers, London, 1816.

== Notes ==
Attribution

This article incorporates text from a publication now in the public domain: Lee, Sidney, ed. (1892). "Jacombe, Thomas". Dictionary of National Biography. Vol. 29. London: Smith, Elder & Co.
