= Mary Love (writer) =

English religious writer

- Born: Mary Stone on or before 1639
- Died: 14 May 1663
- Other names: Mary Bradshaw
- Known for: writing to save her first husband's reputation
- Spouse(s): Christopher Love; Edward Bradshaw

Mary Love (born on or before 1639–14 May 1663) was an English religious writer and biographer. She was involved with a plot involving the exiled Stuart family. Her husband was executed and she remarried but she continued to champion her first husband's reputation.

== Life ==
Her name was Mary Stone when she was born and her father William Stone died in 1639. He had been a London merchant. She became a ward of John Warner and he was a merchant too and a sheriff of London. He employed Christopher Love as his chaplain.

She married Christopher Love, a Presbyterian minister, on 9 April 1645 at St Giles in the Fields church in London.

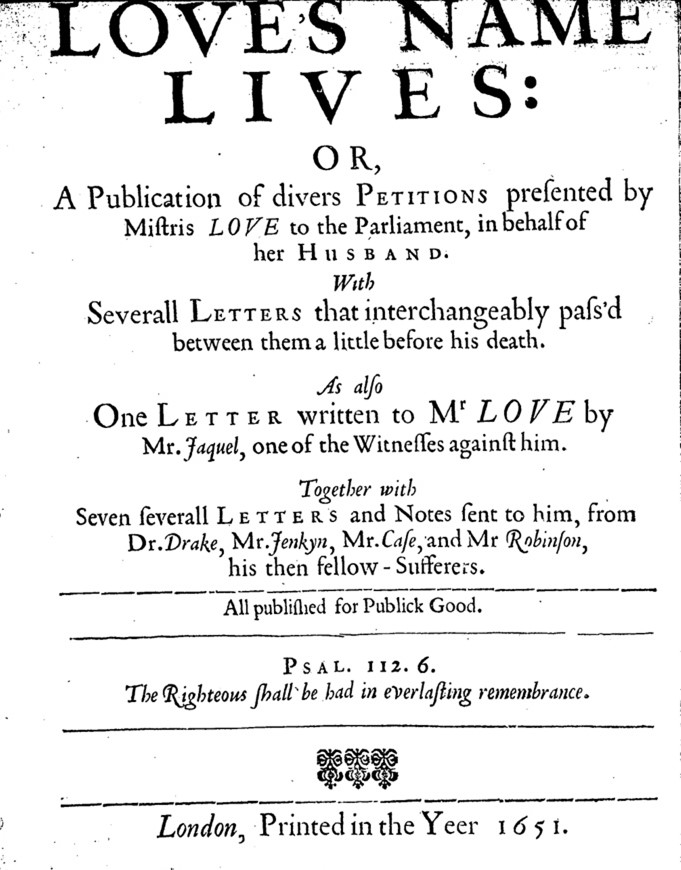
"Love's Name Lives" a book of 1651

Her husband was corresponding with exiled royalty. On 18 Dec. 1650 a pass was obtained to enable Mary to travel to Amsterdam. This is presumed to be a trip in support of what was known as "Love's Plot". Her husband was frequently arrested and tried for the content of his sermons which included a sermon given to the House of Commons which received no thanks.

On 23 August 1651, Christopher Love was executed on Tower Hill in London after two postponements of a week and a month.

The couple had five children, one of whom was born after Love's death. Three of these children died as babies or small children and only two of their children, Christoper and Mary, lived to be adults.

His widow married again to Edward Bradshaw within two years after his death. Her new husband had been mayor of Chester in 1648 and he was mayor again in 1653. Mary and her new husband appeared to have championed her dead husband's work. Her husband's executors published "The Combate Between the Flesh and the Spirit" in 1643 and it is dedicated to the Bradshaws.

They had six children. Mary died in 1663.

== Works ==
- Life of Mr Christopher Love, Dr William’s Library, MS 28.58.
- Love’s Letters, His and Hers, to each Other, (London, 1651).
- Love’s Name Lives (London, 1651).
