= William Bates (minister) =

English Presbyterian minister

William Bates (November 1625 – 14 July 1699) was an English Presbyterian minister.

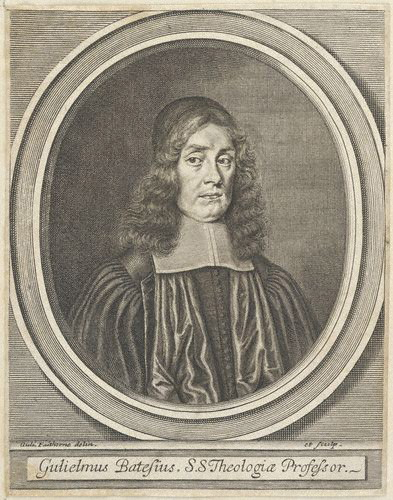
William Bates, engraving by William Faithorne.

== Life ==
He was born in London in November 1625, and was educated at Cambridge, initially at Emmanuel College and subsequently (1644) at Queens' College. In 1647 he proceeded B.A.

He was a Presbyterian. His first living was St. Dunstan's-in-the-West, London, and he remained as vicar until the Act of Uniformity 1662 was passed, when he was ejected. He also took part with other evangelical clergy in carrying on a lecture series in Cripplegate church under the name of 'Morning Exercise.'

Bates took part in the negotiations for the restoration of King Charles II of England; royal favour came to him, and he was appointed one of the royal chaplains. In 1660 he acted as one of the commissioners of the Savoy conference. In 1661 Cambridge conferred on him the degree of D.D. by royal mandate. At the same time he was urged to accept the deanery of Lichfield and Coventry, but like Richard Baxter, Edmund Calamy the elder, Thomas Manton, and others in their position, he declined office. Later, Bates conducted the discussion between the nonconformists and John Pearson, Peter Gunning, and Anthony Sparrow.

In 1662, Bates, along with two thousand others ministers, lost their jobs under the Act of Uniformity; he noted that his Nonconformity was motivated, not by politics, but by his fear of offending God.

In 1665 Bates took the oath imposed by the parliament which met at Oxford 'that he would not at any time endeavour an alteration in the government of church or state.' In this he was supported by John Howe and Matthew Poole, although Richard Baxter refused it.

In 1668 some of the more moderate churchmen endeavoured to work out a scheme of comprehension that would bring presbyterians back into the Church of England. In this Bates, Baxter, and Manton co-operated. But no agreement could be reached. A little later he joined in the presentation of a petition to the king for 'relief of nonconformists'; the king received him graciously, but nothing came of it. Again in 1674, under the conduct of John Tillotson and Edward Stillingfleet, a fresh effort was made towards comprehension through Bates, but once more nothing came of it. After the accession of James II, the disabilities and sufferings of the nonconformists increased. Bates was at Baxter's side when George Jeffreys browbeat and insulted Baxter and his associates. He successfully interceded with Archbishop Tillotson in behalf of Nathaniel, Lord Crewe, bishop of Durham, who had been excepted from the act of indemnity of 1690.

Bates delivered two speeches to William III and Mary on their accession on behalf of the dissenters. He was pastor of the Presbyterian church of Hackney from 1669 until his death. In 1672, he also worked as a lecturer at Pinner’s Hall for 22 years.

He died in Hackney on 14 July 1699, aged 74, having outlived and preached the funeral sermons of Baxter, Manton, Thomas Jacomb, and David Clarkson.

As a preacher he was held to be "silver-tongued" and the "politest" of all the nonconformists.

His writings were first collected in a folio edition the year after his death; in 1815, they were printed in four volumes as The Complete Works of William Bates. John Howe's funeral sermon to Bates's memory was printed with Bates's works.

== Family ==
Bates was married twice; his first wife died, and in 1661 he married Margaret Gravenor.

== Works ==
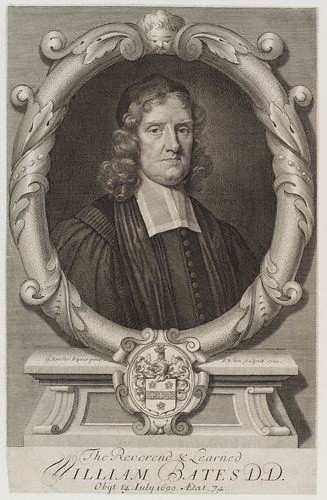
William Bates, engraving by Robert White after Godfrey Kneller.

His works issued were first collected in 1700. They include:

- Harmony of the Divine Attributes (1697?)
  - Harmony of the Divine Attributes (1674)
  - Harmony of the Divine Attributes (1675)
  - Harmony of the Divine Attributes (1771)
  - Harmony of the Divine Attributes (1831)
  - The harmony of the divine attributes in the contrivance and accomplishment of mans redemption ([n.d.])
- Considerations on the Existence of God and Immortality of the Soul (1676).
- Four Last Things–Death, Judgment, Heaven, and Hell (1691, reprinted 1838).
- Sermons preach'd on Several Occasions (1693).
- Spiritual Perfection (1699).
- Vitae Selectorum aliquot Virorum qui doctrina, dignitate, aut pietate inclaruere (1681) Lives of famous divines in Latin.
- The whole works of the Rev. W. Bates (IV volumes) (printed in 1815)
- Joint author of The Attributes of God (1835)
- A funeral-sermon for the Reverend, holy and excellent divine, Mr. Richard Baxter, who deceased Decemb. 8, 1691 : with an account of his life (1692)
- An account of the life and death of Mr. Philip Henry, minister of the gospel near Whitchurch in Shropshire, who died 24 June 1696, in the sixty fifth year of his age; with Dr. Bates's dedication (1797).
