= John Humfrey =

English clergyman

John Humfrey (1621–1719) was an English clergyman, an ejected minister from 1662 and controversialist active in the Presbyterian cause.

== Life ==
He graduated B.A from Pembroke College, Oxford in 1641, and M.A. in 1647. He studied in Oxford during the royalist occupation there.

He received presbyterian ordination in 1649, and became vicar of Frome Selwood, Somerset. He defended with Thomas Blake free admission to communion, in a controversy that opposed him to Roger Drake. His views of the Interregnum period were Erastian.

He was re-ordained by William Piers, Bishop of Bath and Wells in 1661. Humfrey defended his action, in The Question of Re-Ordination(1661). He shortly changed his mind, however, and lost his living in 1662 for nonconformism. He set up a church in Duke's Place, London, and afterwards in Petticoat Lane, Whitechapel.

With the congregationalist Stephen Lobb he wrote two works against Edward Stillingfleet's Mischief of Separation. He was a staunch advocate of a national church and the unity of Protestants within it, and supported ‘comprehension’, the adjustment of positions to bring nonconformists back within the Church of England. His A Case of Conscience (1669) argued that in matter of religion the magistrate should not constrain people against the requirements of their conscience.
