= Stephen Charnock =

English Puritan Presbyterian clergyman (1628–1680)

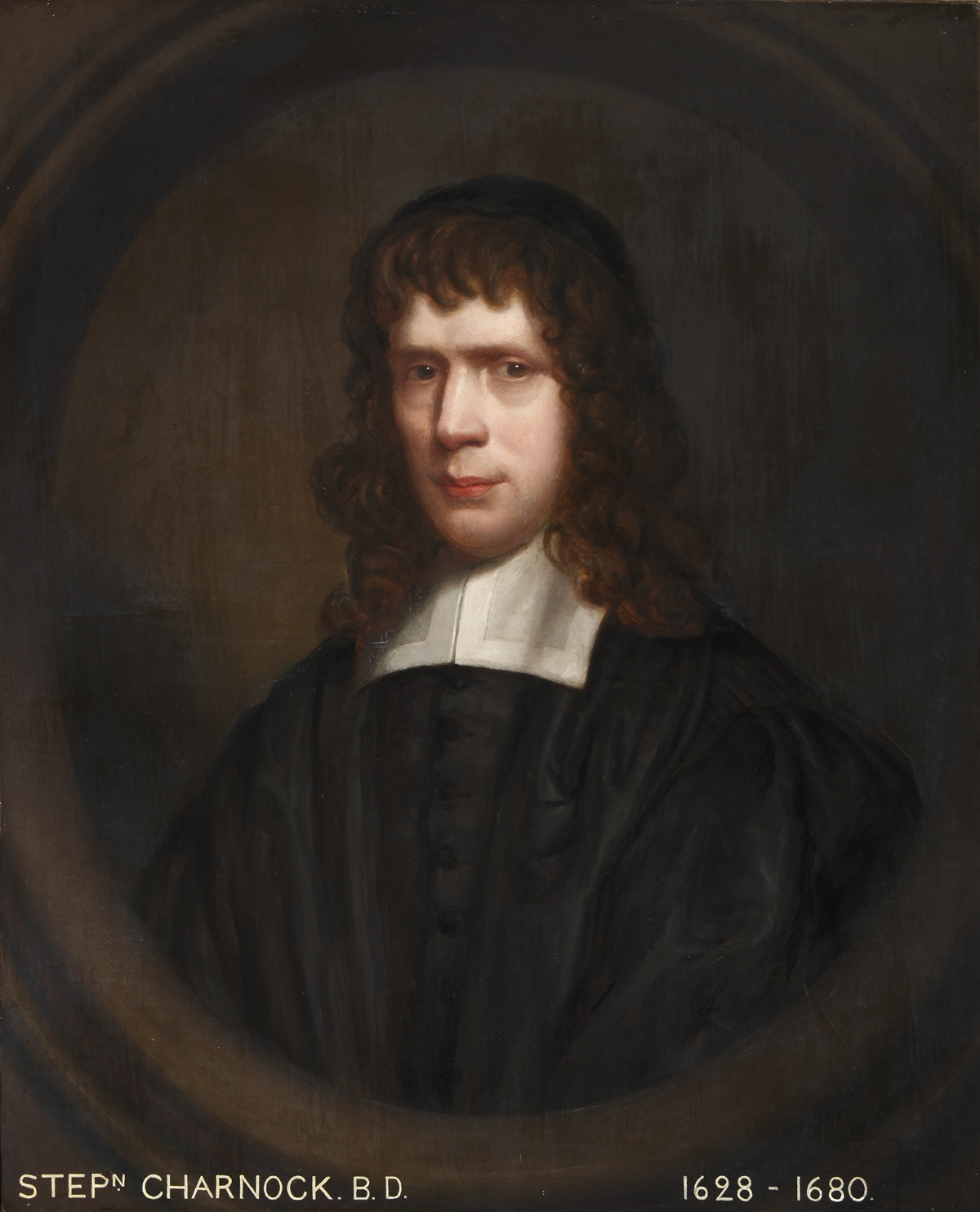
Stephen Charnock.

Stephen Charnock (1628 – 27 July 1680), Puritan divine, was an English Puritan Presbyterian clergyman born at the St Katherine Cree parish of London.

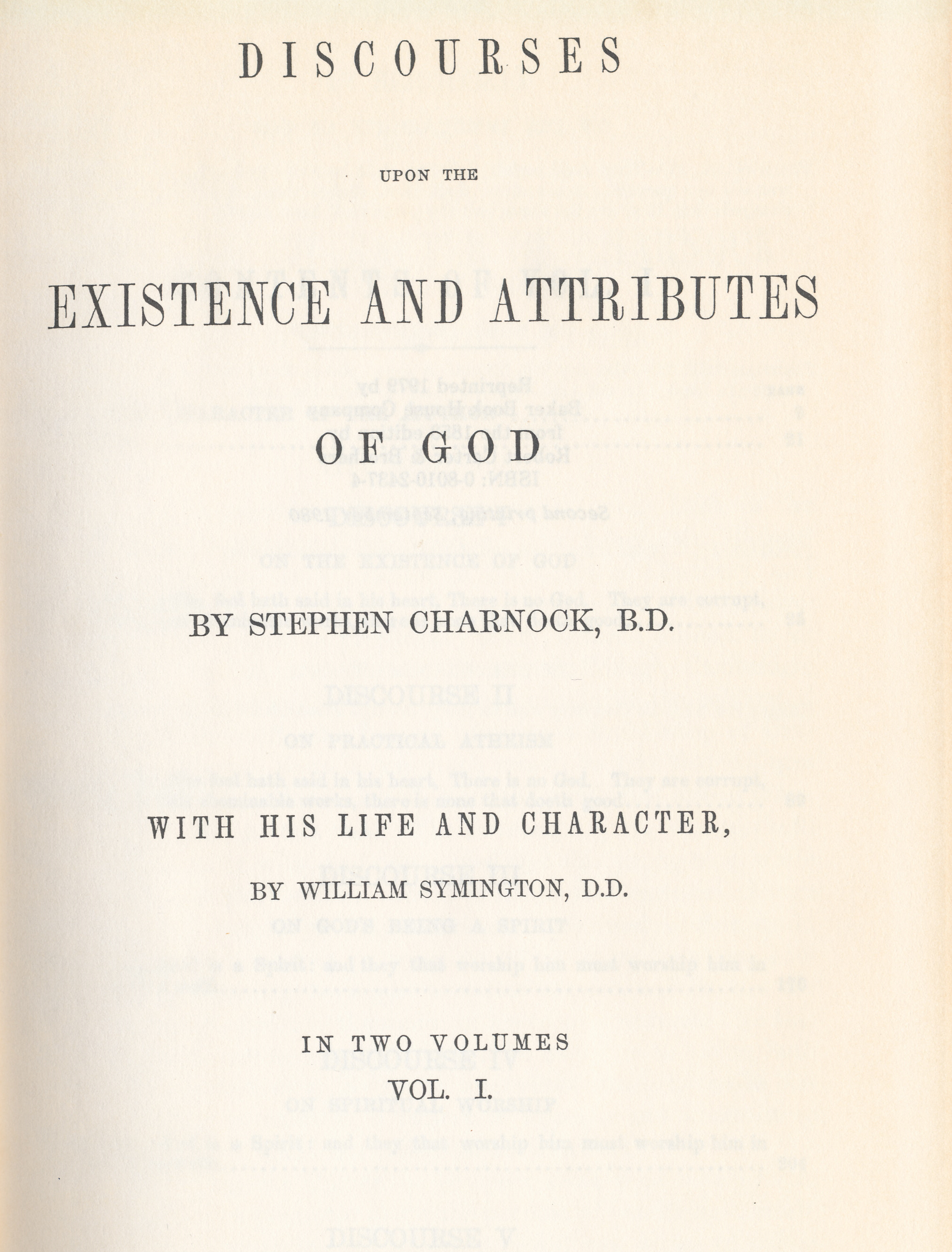
Title page of Charnock's magnum opus

== Life ==
Charnock studied at Emmanuel College, Cambridge, where he was converted to the Christian faith, beginning his spiritual journey as a Puritan divine. After leaving the college, he possibly held a position as either a private teacher or tutor, then moved on to become a minister of the faith in Southwark for a short time, converting individuals to Christianity. He continued on to New College, Oxford, where he earned a fellowship and gained a position as senior proctor.

In 1656, Charnock moved to Ireland where he became a chaplain to Henry Cromwell, governor of Ireland. In Dublin, he began a regular ministry of preaching to other believers. Those who came to hear him were from different classes of society and differing denominations, and he became widely known for the skill by which he discharged his duties.

In 1660, the monarchy of England was restored after its brief time as the Commonwealth of England, and Charles II ascended the throne of England, Scotland, and Ireland. Due to new restrictions, Charnock was now legally prevented from practicing public ministry in Ireland, and in England where he returned. Nevertheless, he continued to study and to minister in non-public ways.

Charnock began a co-pastorship with Thomas Watson at Crosby Hall in London in 1675; this was his last official place of ministry before his death in 1680.

== Works ==
Nearly all of the numerous writings attributed to him were transcribed after his death. Charnock's theological fame rests chiefly in his Discourses upon the Existence and Attributes of God, a series of lectures delivered to the members of his congregation at Crosby Hall; unfortunately, however, the Discourses were cut short by Charnock's death in 1680. The treatise is preserved today as The Existence and Attributes of God, first published posthumously in 1682.
