= John Jackson (minister) =

English nonconformist minister

John Jackson (c.1621–1693) was an English nonconformist minister. Intruded as a fellow during the Parliamentary visitation of the University of Cambridge, he was expelled in 1650 as a result of the engagement controversy, and was an ejected minister of 1662.

== Life ==
The son of Arthur Jackson, he matriculated in 1638 at St Catharine's College, Cambridge, and graduated B.A. there in 1643. He was made a fellow of Queens' College, Cambridge, in 1644, by the parliamentary visitors.

In 1650 Jackson refused to take the required oath, supporting the legitimacy of Parliamentary rule, and was expelled from his college. In London he was made rector of St Benet Paul's Wharf, by Oliver Cromwell. In 1662, after the Uniformity Act required him to read the Book of Common Prayer, he was barred from his church for refusing. He was also deprived of another living, Molesey in Surrey.

Continuing to reside at Molesey, Jackson spent time writing. He made a living by correcting proofs. Later in life he was a preacher at Brentford. He died in the London area.

== Works ==
Jackson wrote Index Biblicus, a concordance, and a memoir of his father (1682) in Annotations upon the Whole Book of Isaiah.
