= Thomas Lye =

English clergyman and theologian (1621–1684)

Thomas Lye, or Lee, or Leigh, (25 March 1621 – 7 June 1684) was an English Nonconformist minister.

== Early life ==
Lye was the son of Thomas Leigh of Chard in Somerset. He matriculated at Wadham College, Oxford, as Leigh, on 4 November 1636, was elected scholar on 6 Oct. 1637, and proceeded B.A. on 25 May 1641. Afterwards, he migrated to Emmanuel College, Cambridge, where he graduated M.A., as Lee, in 1646. He was headmsaster of Bury St. Edmunds school for a short time in 1647, and was incorporated M.A. of Oxford, as Lye, on 8 May 1649. Anthony Wood wrote that he was chaplain of Wadham College about the same time, but his name does not appear on the books.

== Career ==
In August 1651, while minister of Chard, he refused to sign the engagement and was consequently ordered to leave the town not to come within ten miles of it and not to preach in any market town in Somerset. He preached a farewell sermon to his parishioners on 24 August 1651. In November, however, the council at Whitehall reversed the order of banishment and silence. In 1654 he was appointed one of the assistants to the commissioners in Somerset for the ejection of scandalous ministers. Towards the end of 1658, he was elected by the congregation to the charge of All Hallows, Lombard Street, London. He was made one of the approvers of ministers, ‘according to the presbyterian way,’ in London on 14 March 1659. After the Stuart Restoration, in November 1660, he, with other ministers in London, made an ‘acknowledgment’ to the king ‘for his Gracious Concessions... concerning Ecclesiastical affairs,’ but he was ejected from All Hallows in August 1662 by the Act of Uniformity. He seems to have collected a congregation at Dyers' Hall, Thames Street, soon afterwards, and to have preached in the independent meeting-house at Clapham.

Lye was very popular as an instructor of children, and was singularly successful in catechising them. Edmund Calamy the Younger writes that he was taken by his mother to Dyers' Hall to be catechised by ‘good old Mr. Thomas Lye... she having been herself catechised by him in her younger years.’ He probably kept a school at his house in Clapham. He died at Bethnal Green on 7 June 1684, and was buried at Clapham on 11 June. His wife Sarah had predeceased him in September 1678. In his will he left property to his two daughters, Sarah and Mary, all that survived of a large family. On the title-page to the ‘Farewell Sermons of the Ejected Ministers,’ London, 1662, is a small portrait of Lye, with thirteen others. Wood pronounces it ‘very like him.’ Lye's books were sold by auction in London in November 1684.

== Writings ==
Lye published funeral sermons on Mrs. Elizabeth Nicoll, 1660, and on W. Hiett, 1681. Many sermons by him appear in the various editions of the Morning Exercises. He also wrote:

- ‘The Fixed Saint,’ 1662, printed also in ‘The London Ministers' Legacy,’ 1662, and in ‘Collection of Farewell Sermons,’ 1663, 1816.
- ‘Plain and Familiar Method of Instructing the Younger Sort according to the Lesser Catechism of the Assembly of Divines,’ 1673.
- ‘A new Spelling Book,’ 1674, 1677.
- ‘The Child's Delight,’ about 1674, 1684. Wood says it was several times reprinted.
- ‘The Assemblies Shorter Catechism drawn out into distinct Propositions,’ 1674.
- ‘Explanation of the Shorter Catechism,’ 1675, 1676, 1683, 1688, 1689.
- ‘The Principles of the Christian Religion, in a short Catechism,’ 1706.
