= Arthur Jackson (minister) =

English Presbyterian clergyman

Arthur Jackson (1593?-1666) was an English clergyman of strong Presbyterian and royalist views. He was imprisoned in 1651 for suspected complicity in the ‘presbyterian plot’ of Christopher Love, and ejected after the Act of Uniformity 1662.

== Life ==
He was born at Little Waldingfield, Suffolk, about 1593. He early lost his father, a Spanish merchant in London; his mother (whose second husband was Sir Thomas Crooke, bart.) died in Ireland. His uncle and guardian, Joseph Jackson of Edmonton, Middlesex, sent him to Trinity College, Cambridge, where he graduated BA in 1614 and MA in 1617.

In 1619 he left Cambridge, married, and became lecturer, and subsequently rector, at St. Michael's, Wood Street, London. There he remained amidst his flock during the plague year of 1624. He was also chaplain to the Clothworkers' Company, preaching once a quarter in this capacity at Lamb's Chapel, where he celebrated the communion on a common turn-up table. He declined to read The Book of Sports. William Laud remonstrated with him, but took no action against him.

He accepted the rectory of St. Faith's under St. Paul's, vacant about 1642 by the sequestration of Jonathan Brown, dean of Hereford. Under the presbyterian church regime Jackson was a member of the first London classis, and was on the committee of the London provincial assembly.

He was a strong royalist, signing both of the manifestos of January 1649 against the trial of Charles I. In 1651 he got into trouble by refusing to give evidence against Christopher Love. The high court of justice fined him, and sent him to the Fleet Prison (Richard Baxter says the Tower of London) for seventeen weeks.

At the Restoration he waited at the head of the city clergy to present a bible to Charles II as he passed through St. Paul's Churchyard (in Jackson's parish) on his entry into London. He opposed the nonconformist vote of thanks for the king's declaration, being of opinion that any support of prelacy was contrary to the covenant. In 1661 he was a commissioner on the presbyterian side at the Savoy conference.

He lost his living in the Great Ejection that followed the Uniformity Act 1662. He retired to Hadley, Middlesex, afterwards moving to his son's house at Edmonton. He then devoted himself to exegetical studies. He died on 5 August 1666, aged 73.

== Family ==
Jackson married the eldest daughter of T. Bownert of Stonebury, Hertfordshire, who survived him, and by her he had three sons, including John Jackson and five daughters.

== Bibliography ==
- Help for the Understanding of the Holy Scripture; or, Annotations on the Historicall part of the Old Testament, &c., Cambridge and London, 1643; 2nd vol., 1646.
- Annotations on Job, the Psalms, Proverbs, Ecclesiastes, and Song of Solomon, &c., 1658, 2 vols.
- Annotations upon ... Isaiah, &c., 1682. (edited by his son John Jackson and published posthumously).
