= Samuel Browne (judge) =

English Member of Parliament (c. 1598–1668)

Samuel Browne (c. 1598–1668), of Arlesey, Bedfordshire, was Member of Parliament during the English Civil War and the First Commonwealth who supported the Parliamentary cause. However he refused to support the trial and execution of Charles I and, along with five of his colleagues, resigned his seat on the bench. At the Restoration of 1660 this was noted and he was made a judge of the Common Pleas.

He was called to bar at Lincoln's Inn, 1623; M.P. for Clifton-Dartmouth-Hardness, 1640; an active member of the Commons committee for the impeachment of Archbishop Laud, 1644; one of the commissioners to treat with Charles I in the Isle of Wight, 1648; serjeant-at-law, 1648. M.P. for Bedford in 1659 and in 1660 M.P. for Bedfordshire. He was justice of the Common Pleas and knighted, 1660.

== Biography ==
=== Early life ===
Samuel Browne, was born about the year 1598 and was the eldest son of a vicar, Nicholas Browne of Polebrook in Northamptonshire, and Frances, daughter of Thomas St. John, of Cayshoe, Bedfordshire (who was the grandfather of Oliver St John, the chief justice of the Common Pleas during the Protectorate).

Browne was admitted pensioner of Queens' College, Cambridge on 24 February 1614, and was entered at Lincoln's Inn on 28 October 1616, where he was called to the Bar in October 1623, and elected reader in Autumn 1642.

Browne, along with a number of other men who would support Parliamentary cause in the Civil War, had connections to the Feoffees for Impropriations, a body set up in 1625 to purchase livings for Puritan preachers, or the Massachusetts Bay Company. Brown was both a feoffee and a lawyer for the company. Browne along with John Browne, member for Dorset, and Richard Browne member for New Romney, were all zealous about matters of religion in the Long Parliament, and it is not always possible to identify which of the Brownes made a statement on the subject. Although he is often associated with parliamentary radicals, his position like other "Royal Independents" was that they wanted more tolerance of other Protestant creeds than King Charles was willing to allow, and so Browne took up arms to force the King into toleration (see also Cromwellian State Church, 1654–1660).

=== Property ===
Browne inherited from his father various small properties lying in Bedfordshire, Hertfordshire, Kent, Surrey and London. He also purchased the manor of Arlesey in Bedfordshire from Florence, daughter of Thomas Emery of Arlesey (died 1636), widow of Henry Goodwin in 1646 or 1649, but he must have been living in it before that date as in 1644 he complained that Arlesley was used for quartering troops, and he procured an order for their removal.

=== Public office ===
Browne probably served as a Justice of the Peace in Essex, his wife's county, however, and had been named in 1630 for the sewers commission in Bedfordshire.

He was returned as a member for the boroughs of Clifton-Dartmouth-Hardness, in the Long Parliament of November 1640. He appears to have had no connection with the constituency before he was elected and he may have gained it through the patronage of his cousin Oliver St John who was MP for Totness and had been in Lincoln's Inn at the same time as Browne.

In February 1643—possibly through the influence of his cousin St. John (who was then solicitor-general)—Browne, Serjeant Richard Creswell and John Puleston, were recommended by the parliament to be Barons of the Exchequers, in the peace proposals laid before the king at Oxford, which came to nothing. Around the same time he joined the newly formed Committee of Both Kingdoms on which he continued to sit until 1648, and the Committee for the Preservation of the Records. In November of that year Browne and St. John were two of the four members of the House of Commons to whom, with two lords, the new Great Seal was entrusted.

The commoners appointed as commissioner of the Great Seal still continued to perform their other parliamentary functions. Lord Commissioner Browne was most active in the proceedings against Archbishop Laud, summing up the case in the House of Lords and carrying up the ordinance for his attainder passed by the Commons in November 1644. His speech has not been preserved, but from the constant references which Laud makes to it he appears to have put the case against the archbishop in a very effective way.

After the trial was ended (2 January 1645) he was deputed, with Serjeants John Wilde and Robert Nicolas, to lay before the House of Lords the reasons which, in the opinion of the House of Commons, justified an ordinance of attainder against the archbishop. This had already been passed by the Commons, and the Lords immediately followed suit.

In July 1645 a paper was introduced to the House of Commons, emanating from Lord Savile, and containing what was in substance an impeachment of Denzil Holles and Bulstrode Whitelocke, of high treason in betraying the trust reposed in them in connection with the recent negotiations at Oxford, of which they had had the conduct. After some discussion the matter was referred to a committee, of which Browne was nominated chairman. The affair is frankly described by Whitelocke as a machination of the independents, designed to discredit the Presbyterian party, of which both Hollis and himself were members; and as he accuses Browne of displaying a strong bias in favour of the impeachment, it may be inferred that at this time he had the reputation of belonging to the advanced faction. The charge was ultimately dismissed.

In 1646 Browne sat on the Committee for Exclusion from Sacrament and the Committee for the Abuse of Hereditary, and after remaining a commissioner of the Great Seal for nearly three years, the lords commissioners were removed in October 1646, and the Great Seal transferred to the speakers of the two houses. With his workload in Parliament reduced he resumed his practice at the bar.

In 1648 Browne sat on the Committee for Scandalous Offences and his time of sitting on the Committee of Both Kingdoms came to an end. He was also sent as one of the commissioners to treat with the king in the Isle of Wight. On the receipt of letters from the commissioners containing the king's ultimatum (the Treaty of Newport), the House of Commons, after voting the king's terms unsatisfactory, resolved "that notice be taken of the extraordinary wise management of this treaty by the commissioners".

The next day, 12 October 1648, he was included in the batch of twenty-two who were made Serjeants by the parliament, when both he and his cousin St. John were also elevated to the bench, he as judge of the King's Bench, and St. John as chief justice of the Common Pleas. With the failure of the Newport negotiations (and the reconstitution of the House of Commons by Pride's Purge), the House of Commons resolved to try King Charles for treason, Browne with five of his colleagues, resigned their seats on the bench rather than participate in the Regicide.

Browne took no further part in public life until the last year of the Interregnum. After the fall of the Protectorate Browne was elected to Parliament for the constituency of Bedford in 1659 and to Bedfordshire in the Convention Parliament of 1660.

After the restoration of the monarchy, he was not only immediately reinstated as a serjeant, and within six months was reinstated to a place on the bench, being constituted, on 3 November 1600, a judge of the Common Pleas. On 4 December of that year he was knighted. He retained his seat as a judge of the Common Pleas until his death on 11 April 1668. He was buried under a monument still existing in the church of Arlesey in Bedfordshire, where he had a house.

== Renown ==
Browne's renown derives less from his work as a jurist than from his astute performance as a parliamentary manager during the critical years of the English civil war. ... Browne's success as a parliamentary manager derived from his reputation as a man of genuine integrity. He was widely admired by moderates and radicals alike for his intelligence, his learning, and his consummate professionalism.

— James S. Hart Jr.

== Family ==
Browne married Elizabeth, daughter of John Meade, of Nortofts, Finchingfield, Essex.
