= James Primrose (physician) =

English physician (d. 1659)

James Primrose or Primerose M.D. (d. 1659) was an English physician, an opponent of William Harvey's theory of the circulation of the blood.

== Life ==
The son of Gilbert Primrose, he was born at St. Jean d'Angély, now in Charente-Inférieure, France. He studied at the University of Bordeaux, there graduated M.A., and then proceeded to Montpellier, where he took the degree of M.D. in 1617, and attended the lectures of John Varandaeus, professor of physic.

He was incorporated M.D. at Oxford in March 1628. On 9 December 1629, at Dr. Argent's house in London, he was examined for admission to the license of the College of Physicians, William Harvey, being one of his examiners (manuscript annals). He passed, and was admitted the following day. He settled in Kingston-upon-Hull, and there practised his profession. He died in December 1659 at Hull, where he was buried in Holy Trinity Church.

== Works ==
His first book appeared in London in 1630: Exercitationes et Animadversiones in Librum Gulielmi Harvaei de Motu Cordis et Circulatione Sanguinis, an attempt to refute Harvey's theory of the circulation of the blood. His Animadversiones in J. Walaei Disputationem, Amsterdam, 1639, Animadversiones in Theses D. Henrici le Roy, Leyden, 1640, and Antidotum adversus Spongium venatum Henrici Regii, Leyden, 1640, are further arguments on the same subject. He attacked Roger Drake, one of Harvey's supporters. Harvey made no reply.

In 1631 Primrose published at Oxford Academia Monspeliensis descripta, dedicated to Thomas Clayton, the Regius Professor of Medicine at Oxford, and in 1638, in London, De Vulgi in Medicina Erroribus. An English translation of this was published by Robert Wittie, a physician in Kingston upon Hull, in 1651. A French translation appeared at Lyon in 1689; other Latin editions appeared at Amsterdam in 1639 and at Rotterdam in 1658 and 1668. It refutes such doctrines as that a hen fed on gold leaf assimilates the gold, so that three pure golden lines appear on her breast; that the linen of the sick ought not to be changed; that remedies are not to be rejected for their unpleasantness; and that gold boiled in broth will cure consumption. Andrew Marvell wrote eighteen lines of Latin verse and an English poem of forty lines in praise of this translation. Wittie published in 1640 in London an English version of a separate work by Primrose on part of the same subject, The Antimoniall Cup twice Cast.

In 1647 Primrose published, at Leyden, Aphorismi necessarii ad doctrinam Medicinae acquirendam perutiles, and, at Amsterdam, in 1650, Enchiridion Medicum, a digest of Galenic medicine, on the same general plan as Nial O'Glacan's treatise, and in 1651 Ars Pharmaceutica, methodus brevissima de eligendis et componendis medicinis. His last four books were all published at Rotterdam: De Mulierum Morbis, 1655; Destructio Fundamentorum Vopisci Fortunati Plempii, 1657; De Febribus, 1658; and Partes duae de Morbis Puerorum, 1659. All his books are compilations, with few observations of his own.

== Family ==
He married Louise de Haukmont at the Walloon church in London in 1640.
