= The Godly Man's Picture =

- 1992 edition reprint of The Godly Man's Picture
- Author: Thomas Watson
- Language: English
- Publisher: Banner of Truth Trust
- Publication date: 1666; First Banner of Truth edition 1992
- Publication place: United Kingdom
- Media type: Print (Paperback)
- Pages: 252

The Godly Man's Picture is a 1666 work of systematic theology by Thomas Watson, a 17th century English Puritan preacher. The full title is The Godly Man's Picture Drawn with a Scripture Pencil, or, Some Characteristic Marks of a Man who is Going to Heaven. The book is a work of English Puritan spirituality.

The book covers in detail the ideal qualities of a "Godly Man", including (among others) faith, love, weeping, humility, sincerity, zealotry, patience, and gratitude.

== Purpose ==
The book's purpose, according to Watson, is to describe a godly person, "in his full lineaments... that all into whose hands this book may providentially come, may be so enamoured with piety as to embrace it heartily."

== Structure ==
The book follows a strict outline format and progressive logic, with many points made through the asking of a question, a series of in-depth answers, and several applications to be drawn from the answers. The book's heavy emphasis on application is typical of Puritan writing.

The book is systematically partitioned into twelve sections and thirty subsections, with the majority of the book (169 pages) contained within the twenty-four subsections of section 4: Showing the Characteristics of a Godly Man.

The sections and subsections are as follows:

1. ‘For this shall every one that is godly pray unto thee’ (Psa. 32:6) 2. Expounding the Nature of Godliness 3. A Reproof to Such as are Only Pretenders to Godliness 4. Showing the Characteristics of a Godly Man

i. A Man of Knowledge
ii. A Man Moved by Faith
iii. A Man Fired with Love
iv. A Man Like God
v. A Man Careful about the Worship of God
vi. A Man who Serves God not men
vii. A Man who Prizes Christ
viii. A Man who Weeps
ix. A Man who Loves the Word
x. A Man who has the Spirit of God Residing in him
xi. A Man of Humility
xii. A Man of Prayer
xiii. A Man of Sincerity
xiv. A Heavenly Man
xv. A Zealous Man
xvi. A Patient Man
xvii. A Thankful Man
xviii. A Man who Loves the Saints
xix. A Man who does not Indulge himself in any Sin
xx. A Man who is Good in his Relationships
xxi. A Man who does Spiritual Things in a Spiritual Manner
xxii. A Man Thoroughly Trained in Religion
xxiii. A Man who Walks with God
xxiv. A Man who Strives to be an Instrument for Making Others Godly

5. Two Conclusions About the Characteristics of a godly Man 6. An Exhortation to Godliness

i. Let Men Seriously Weigh Their Misery While They Remain in a State of Ungodliness
ii. What Rare Persons the Godly Are
iii. To Strive for Godliness is Most Rational
iv. The Excellence of Godliness
v. There are only a few Godly
vi. Consider How Vain and Contemptible Other This Are, About Which Persons Void of Godliness Busy Themselves

7. Prescribing Some Helps to Godliness 8. An Exhortation to Persevere in Godliness 9. Motives to Persevere in Godliness 10. Counsel for the Godly 11. Comfort to the Godly 12. Showing the Mystic Union between Christ and the Saints

== Themes ==
=== Religion as Relationship ===
The Puritan understanding of godliness as fundamentally relational rather than propositional runs throughout the book. Instead of being a godly Christian by what one believes about Jesus Christ in an epistemological sense, Watson describes the godly as relating to Jesus as a bridegroom to a bride. Using strongly romantic language from the Song of Solomon and other parts of the Bible, Watson speaks of "a conjugal union between Christ and believers" (239). He further states that "the joy that flows from the mystic union is unspeakable and full of glory" (241).

=== Radical Selflessness ===
A radically selfless notion of Christianity emerges in the book, wherein the believer ought to love and serve God not because of benefits from God, but because the inherent worth of God. This idea ties in with the idea of religion as relationship. As Watson puts it, "God is to be loved more than his mercies" (132).

== Quotes ==
Watson's writing is known for its quotability due to its succession of compact but meaning-filled statements reiterating and refining key points. Some of the key quotes are as follows:

- "A natural man… may have the eye of reason open, but he does not discern the things of God in a spiritual manner… he is no more able to judge sacred things than a blind man is able to judge colors" (20).
- "The ship of ordinances will not carry us to heaven… unless the wind of God’s Spirit blows" (76).
- "God must anoint our eyes before we can see… we may have excellent notion in divinity, but the Holy Spirit must enable us to know them in a spiritual manner" (27).
- "Divine sorrow is excellent… Repenting tears are precious God puts them in his bottle" (58).
- "Sin makes up the major part of the Christian. There are more dregs than spirit in the best heart" (234).
