= Savoy Conference =

1661 liturgical conference in London

The Savoy Conference of 1661 was a significant liturgical discussion that took place, after the Restoration of Charles II, in an attempt to effect a reconciliation within the Church of England.

== Proceedings ==
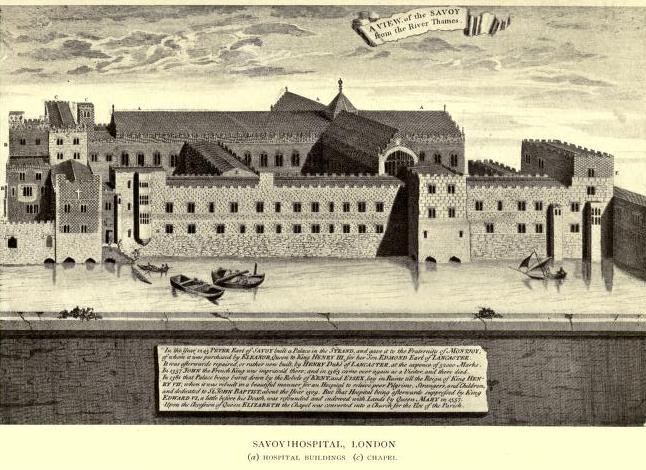
The Savoy Hospital by the River Thames (1747)

It was convened by Gilbert Sheldon, in his lodgings at the Savoy Hospital in London. The Conference sessions began on 15 April 1661, and continued for around four months. By June, a deadlock became apparent.

The conference was attended by commissioners: 12 Anglican bishops, and 12 representative ministers of the Puritan and Presbyterian factions. Each side also had nine deputies (called assistants or coadjutors). The nominal chairman was Accepted Frewen, the Archbishop of York. The object was to revise the Book of Common Prayer. Richard Baxter for the Presbyterian side presented a new liturgy, but this was not accepted. As a result the Church of England retained internal tensions about governance and theology, while a significant number of dissenters left its structure and created non-conformist groups retaining Puritan theological commitments.

In 1662 the Act of Uniformity followed, mandating the usage of the 1662 Book of Common Prayer and spurring the Great Ejection.

== Commissioners ==
The nominated commissioners and deputies were as follows:

- Accepted Frewen, Archbishop of York
- Gilbert Sheldon, Bishop of London
- John Cosin, Bishop of Durham
- John Warner, Bishop of Rochester
- Henry King, Bishop of Chichester
- Humphrey Henchman, Bishop of Salisbury
- George Morley, Bishop of Worcester
- Robert Sanderson, Bishop of Lincoln
- Benjamin Laney, Bishop of Peterborough
- Brian Walton, Bishop of Chester
- Richard Sterne, Bishop of Carlisle
- John Gauden, Bishop of Exeter

For the presbyterians:

- Edward Reynolds, Bishop of Norwich
- Anthony Tuckney
- John Conant
- William Spurstow
- John Wallis
- Thomas Manton
- Edmund Calamy
- Richard Baxter
- Arthur Jackson
- Thomas Case
- Samuel Clarke
- Matthew Newcomen

== Deputies ==
On the episcopal side there were:

- John Earle, Dean of Westminster
- Peter Heylin Sub-dean of Westminster.
- John Hacket
- John Barwick
- Peter Gunning
- John Pearson
- Thomas Pierce
- Anthony Sparrow
- Herbert Thorndike

On the presbyterian side there were:

- Thomas Horton
- Thomas Jacomb
- William Bates
- John Rawlinson
- William Cooper
- John Lightfoot
- John Collinges
- Benjamin Woodbridge

There was to have been one more deputy on the presbyterian side, Roger Drake. A clerical error caused his name to appear as "William Drake" in the official document, and he did not actually attend.

== Publications ==
- "Order of the Savoy Conference", in Gee and Hardy Documents Illustrative of English Church History, pp. 588–594 (London, 1896)
- Prof. Charles Woodruff Shields, Book of the Common Prayer... as amended by Westminster Divines, 1661 (Philadelphia, 1867; new ed., New York, 1880).
- Daniel Neal, History of the Puritans, part iv (New York, 1863)
