= Christopher Love =

Welsh Presbyterian preacher and activist

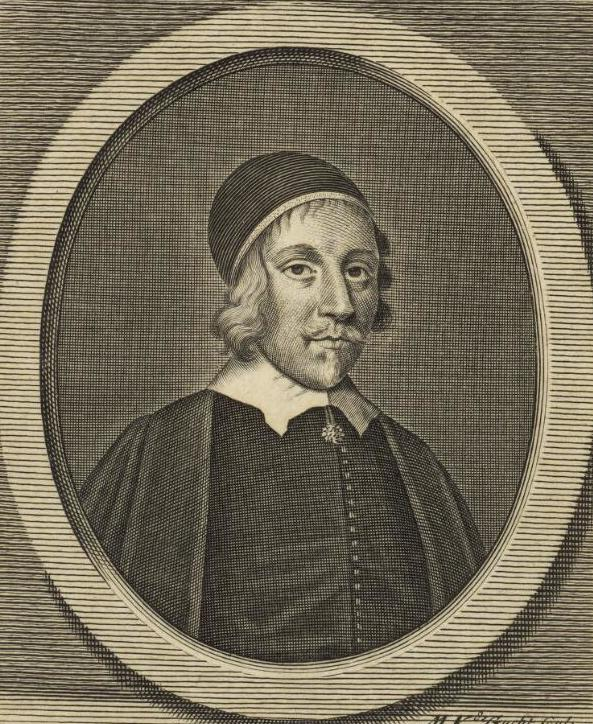
Portrait of Mr. Christor. Love, minister

Christopher Love (1618, Cardiff, Wales – 22 August 1651, London) was a Welsh Presbyterian preacher and activist during the English Civil War. In 1651, he was executed by the English government for plotting with the exiled Stuart court. The Puritan faction in England considered Love to be a martyr and hero.

== Life ==
Love was born in 1618 in Cardiff. At age 14, Love became an adherent to the Puritan congregation. His father disapproved of Love's interests in religion and sent him to London to become an apprentice. However, in 1636, Love's mother and his religious mentor sent him to Oxford University instead. When William Laud, the Archbishop of Canterbury, introduced his Canons of 1640 to reform the English church, Love was one of the first Puritans to renounce them. As a young man, Love became the domestic chaplain to John Warner, the sheriff of London.

St Anne's, Aldersgate invited Love to become a lecturer, but William Juxon, the bishop of London, refused to provide Love with an allowance for three years; Archbishop Laud had warned Juxon to keep an eye on Love. Declining Episcopal ordination, Love went to Scotland to seek ordination from the Presbytery there; However, the Scottish Church would only ordain residents of Scotland and Love planned to return to England.

On Love's return to England around 1641, he was invited by the mayor and aldermen of Newcastle to preach there. In Newcastle, Love started attacking what he saw as errors in the Book of Common Prayer in his sermons, resulting in his being sent to jail. After filing a writ of Habeas Corpus, the Newcastle authorities sent Love to London. He was tried in the King's Bench and acquitted of all charges.

Around the outbreak of the First English Civil War, Love preached as a lecturer at Tenterden, Kent, on the lawfulness of a defensive war. The authorities accused him of treason, but Love was again acquitted in court and was able to recover his court costs. Shortly afterward, Love was appointed as chaplain to Colonel John Venn's regiment, and became preacher to the garrison of Windsor Castle.

On 23 January 1644, at Aldermanbury, London, Love received Presbyterian ordination from Thomas Horton. Love was one of the first preachers in England to receive this appointment. He then became the pastor of St Lawrence Jewry. According to William Maxwell Hetherington, Love was a superadded member of the Westminster Assembly. However, this assertion was questioned by Alexander Ferrier Mitchell, for lack of evidence and the more careful edition of the minutes of the Westminster Assembly by Chad van Dixhoorn shows that Hetherington was in error and Love was not made a member of the Assembly.

On 31 January 1645, Love preached an inflammatory sermon in Uxbridge. This was the same day that the commissioners for the Treaty of Uxbridge arrived there. In his Vindication manuscript, Love claimed that his preaching there was accidental; however, the House of Commons voted to bring Love to London and confine him at the House during the negotiations. On 25 November 164, Love preached before the Commons; he did not receive the customary vote of thanks. His House sermon offended the Independents, who on gaining power in the House confined Love again. A House Committee for Plundered Ministers cited Love on two more occasions. Although Love was discharged, the English authorities watched his movements.

== Plot to restore Charles II ==
In 1651, Love became involved in a plot to restore Charles II as the king of England.

In the plot, the Presbyterians sent Colonel Silius Titus to France to deliver letters to Henrietta Maria, the mother of Charles II; Colonel Ashworth brought the replies to Love's house in London. On 18 December 1650, Love's wife obtained an official pass to travel to Amsterdam. During this period, Love also received letters from Scottish Presbyterians who were sympathetic to Charles II. Love also hosted discussions in his home how to raise money for firearms from the English Presbyterians.

On 7 May 1651, Love and other prominent Presbyterians were arrested and confined in Liverpool. On 14 May 1651, Love was ordered to be arrested on charges of high treason and was confined to the Tower of London. In late June and 5 July, he was tried before the high court of justice. Love was defended by Matthew Hale; presiding at the trial was Richard Keble.

On 16 July, Love was convicted of treason and sentenced to death. Robert Hammond wrote to Oliver Cromwell asking for leniency for Love. Love received first a one-month reprieve and then a one-week reprieve. On 16 August, Love wrote his final appeal for leniency to the English parliament. In this appeal, he admitted guilt to virtually all of his charges. However, the English courts wanted to make an example of Love to quash any further trouble from the Presbyterians.

== Death ==
On 23 August 1651, Christopher Love was executed on Tower Hill in London. His execution was attended by Simeon Ashe and Edmund Calamy. On 25 August, Love was privately buried at St Lawrence Church. His funeral sermon was preached by Thomas Manton. Robert Wild wrote a poem The Tragedy of Mr. Christopher Love at Tower Hill (1651).

Love was married to Mary Stone, a ward of John Warner. The couple had five children, one of whom was born after Love's death. Three of these children died as babies or small children and only two of their children, Christoper and Mary, lived to be adults. His widow married again to Edward Bradshaw (a twice mayor of Chester) two years after his death and they had six children. Mary died in 1663.

== Works ==
After Love's execution, leading Presbyterians of London (Edmund Calamy, Simeon Ashe, Jeremiah Whitaker, William Taylor, and Allan Geare) published Love's sermons. The most important of his works are:

- Grace, the Truth and Growth, and different Degrees thereof (226 pp., London, 1652);
- Heaven's Glory, Hell's Terror (350 pp., 1653);
- Combate between the Flesh and the Spirit (292 pp., 1654);
- Treatise of Effectual Calling (218 pp.,1658);
- The Natural Man's Case Stated (8vo, 280 pp., 1658);
- Select Works (8vo, Glasgow, 1806–07, 2 vols.).

Short and plaine Animadversions on some Passages in Mr. Dels' Sermon (1646) was a reply to William Dell. A modest and clear Vindication of the ... ministers of London from the scandalous aspersions of John Price (1649) (attributed to Love) replied to the Clerico-classicum of John Price.
