= Gilbert Primrose (minister) =

Scottish Calvinist minister

Gilbert Primrose D.D. (1566/7–1642) was a Scottish Calvinist minister, a pastor in France and London.

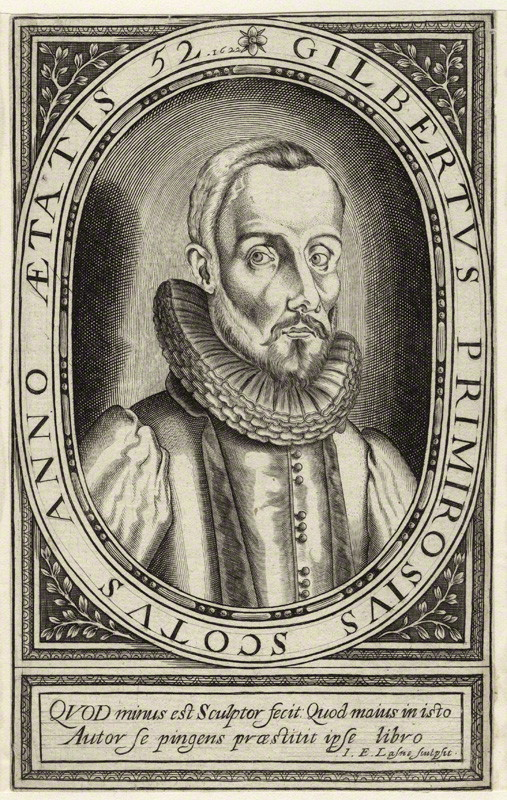
Gilbert Primrose

== Life ==
Born about 1580 into a Perthshire family, he was son of Gilbert Primrose, principal surgeon to James VI of Scotland, and Alison Graham, his wife. He was educated at St. Andrews University, where he took the degree of M.A. He then went to France, and was received as a minister of the Reformed Church there. His first charge was at Mirambeau, from which he was transferred in 1603 to the church of Bordeaux. His influence helped John Cameron become regent in the new college of Bergerac.

The Synod of Rochelle (March 1607) of the French Reformed Church, sent Primrose to John Welsh of Ayr, and other banished Scots ministers who had been banished, to offer financial support. At the synod Primrose presented letters from King James and from the magistrates and ministers of Edinburgh, recalling him home to serve the church in that city; but he was induced to remain in Bordeaux. later in 1607 he visited Britain, and was commissioned by the Reformed congregation at Rochelle to ask King James to set at liberty Andrew Melville from the Tower of London, and to allow him to accept a professorship in their college. The request was refused, and the application gave offence to the French court. On his return Primrose was called before Henry IV of France, and the people of Rochelle were reprimanded for communicating with a foreign sovereign without the knowledge or consent of their own.

In 1608 John Cameron became Primrose's colleague at Bordeaux, and they were on good terms for ten years, when Cameron left for a professorship at Saumur Academy. At the end of 1615 and beginning of 1616 the church at Bordeaux was closed by government pressure, and its ministers were sent away to insure their safety; they were recalled when matters became more settled. In 1623 an act was passed forbidding ministers of other nations to officiate in France, and at Synod of Charenton in September of that year the royal commissioner presented letters from the French king stating that Primrose and Cameron were no longer to be employed, for reasons of state. After deputies were sent to Louis XIII to intercede on their behalf, Primrose was obliged to leave the country.

In London, Primrose was chosen one of the ministers of the French Protestant Church of London, an appointment which he held till his death; and he was also made chaplain in ordinary to James I. On 18 January 1625 he was incorporated in the University of Oxford, receiving the degree of D.D. on the same day on the recommendation of the king. Four years later he became a canon of Windsor.

Primrose died in London in October or November 1642.

== Works ==
Primrose's published works were:

- Le vœu de Jacob opposé aux vœux de Moines, 4 vols., Bergerac, 1610; translated into English by John Bultiel, London, 1617.
- La Trompette de Sion (18 sermons), Bergerac, 1610; a Latin edition was published at Danzig in 1631.
- La Defense de la Religion Reformée, Bergerac, 1619.
- Panegyrique à très grand et très puissant Prince Charles, Prince de Galles, Paris, 1624.
- The Christian Man's Tears and Christ's Comforts, London, 1625.
- Nine Sermons, London, 1625.
- The Table of the Lord, London, 1626.

== Family ==
Primrose married three times, his first wife being Elizabeth Brenin who died in 1637, his second Jeanne Hersent, widow of Abraham Aurelius (died 1641), and the third Louise de Lobel, widow of Jacob Cool. He had four sons: James, David, Stephen, and John.

== Notes ==
Attribution

This article incorporates text from a publication now in the public domain: Lee, Sidney, ed. (1896). "Primrose, Gilbert". Dictionary of National Biography. Vol. 46. London: Smith, Elder & Co.
