= Thomas Vincent (minister) =

English Puritan minister and author (1634–1678)

- Born: May 1634; Hertford, England
- Died: 15 October 1678 (aged 44)
- Resting place: St Giles-without-Cripplegate, London
- Education: Westminster School; Felsted School; Christ Church, Oxford
- Occupations: Nonconformist minister and author
- Known for: God's Terrible Voice in the City
- Relatives: Nathaniel Vincent (brother)

Thomas Vincent (May 1634 – 15 October 1678) was an English Puritan and nonconformist minister and author. Ejected from the rectory of St Mary Magdalene, Milk Street, London, under the Act of Uniformity 1662, he later preached at Hoxton.

Vincent is chiefly remembered for God's Terrible Voice in the City (1667), his account of the Great Plague of London and the Great Fire of London. Seven members of his household died during the plague, and he continued preaching in London parish churches during the outbreak.

== Early life and education ==
Vincent was born at Hertford in May 1634, the second son of John Vincent and the elder brother of Nathaniel Vincent, who also became a nonconformist minister. Educated at Westminster School and Felsted grammar school, Essex, he entered Christ Church, Oxford, in 1648. He matriculated on 27 February 1651, graduated BA on 16 March 1652 and MA on 1 June 1654, and was then chosen as catechist.

After leaving Oxford, Vincent became chaplain to Robert Sidney, 2nd Earl of Leicester. He was incorporated at the University of Cambridge in 1656.

== Ministry ==
Vincent was appointed to the sequestered rectory of St Mary Magdalene, Milk Street, in the City of London. He held the living until 1662, when he was ejected under the Act of Uniformity. After his ejection he withdrew to Hoxton, preached privately, and assisted Thomas Doolittle at his school near Bunhill Fields.

During the Great Plague of London in 1665, Vincent preached regularly in parish churches. His later account reported seven deaths in his own household during the outbreak. After the plague and the Great Fire, he gathered a congregation at Hoxton, apparently in a wooden meeting house, although he was for a time dispossessed of it.

Vincent was among the signers of the 1673 Puritan preface to the Scots Metrical Psalter. He was imprisoned for nonconformity. He died on 15 October 1678 and was buried on 27 October in the churchyard of St Giles-without-Cripplegate. His funeral sermon was preached by Samuel Slater.

== Writing ==
Vincent's best-known work was God's Terrible Voice in the City, first published in 1667. The book presented the plague of 1665 and the fire of 1666 as divine judgments and combined narrative description with Puritan religious interpretation. The Dictionary of National Biography described Vincent's plague account as "graphic".

He also published devotional and doctrinal works, including A Spiritual Antidote for a Dying Soul (1665), Wells of Salvation Opened (1669), The True Christian's Love to the Unseen Christ, and An Explanation of the Assembly's Shorter Catechism.

== Selected works ==
- Vincent, Thomas (1665). A Spiritual Antidote for a Dying Soul. London. OCLC 606669814.
- Vincent, Thomas (1667). God's Terrible Voice in the City. London. OCLC 228705148.
- Vincent, Thomas (1668). The Foundation of God Standeth Sure. London. OCLC 612655449.
- Vincent, Thomas (1669). Wells of Salvation Opened. London. OCLC 606747538.
- Vincent, Thomas (1675). An Explanation of the Assembly's Shorter Catechism. London. OCLC 228727561.
- Vincent, Thomas (1677). The True Christian's Love to the Unseen Christ. London. OCLC 9566801.
- Vincent, Thomas (1680). Holy and Profitable Sayings. London. OCLC 606766269.
