= Thomas Case =

English clergyman

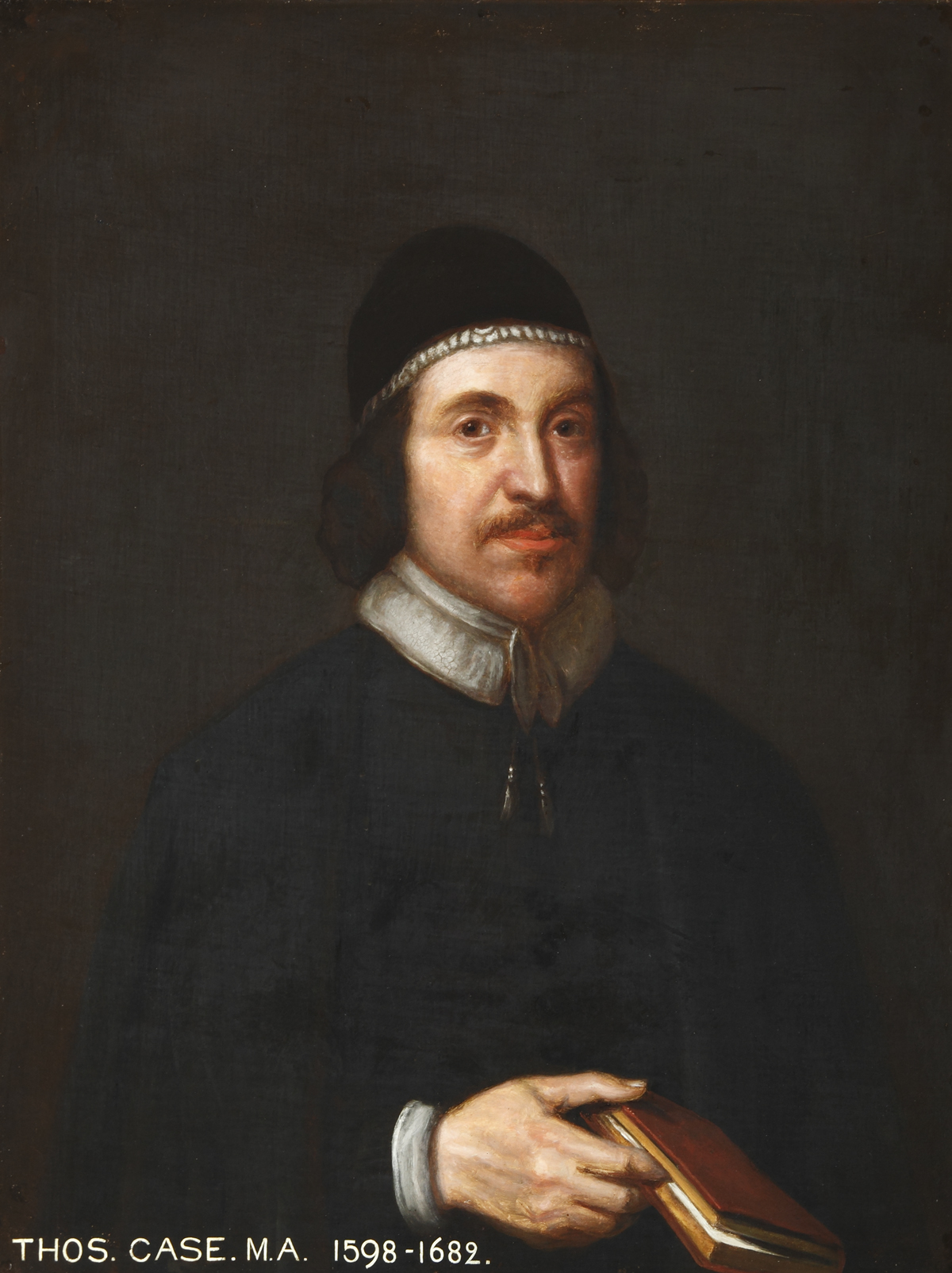
Thomas Case

Thomas Case (1598 – 30 May 1682) was an English clergyman of Presbyterian beliefs, a member of the Westminster Assembly, where he was one of the strongest advocates of Christian government. Although earlier a strong defender of the Parliamentary cause, he fell out of sympathy with the regicides and became a supporter of the Restoration of the Stuart monarchy.

== Life ==
He was born in Kent, the son of George Case, vicar at Boxley. He was educated at Canterbury and Merchant Taylors' School. A student of Christ Church, Oxford in 1616, he graduated M.A. in 1623. A curate at North Repps, Norfolk, he became incumbent of Erpingham.

He was a preacher at Manchester and Salford in 1635 but was prosecuted for contempt of church ceremonies in both dioceses (Norwich and Chester). His marriage to Anne Mosley of Ancoats in 1637 brought him into an influential family, connecting him to Salford chapel by her late husband Robert Booth and to John Angier. His stepson Sir Robert Booth was Lord Chief Justice of Ireland 1679-80: Case supervised his education, and instilled his own Presbyterian beliefs in him.

He was a lecturer in several London churches 1641-2, and a member of the Westminster Assembly from 1643. He was intruded rector of Stockport, Cheshire, in 1645-6.

He was ejected by Parliament from the rectory of St. Mary Magdalen, Milk Street in 1649, after he refused the engagement. Then he spent time as a lecturer in Aldermanbury and Cripplegate.

He was arrested on 2 May 1651, becoming one of the ministers imprisoned as being privy to the presbyterian plot to recall Charles II, along with William Blackmore, Roger Drake, Matthew Haviland, Arthur Jackson, William Jenkyn, Christopher Love who was singled out as ringleader, Ralph Robinson, and Thomas Watson. He spent about six months in the Tower of London. Subsequently he was rector of St. Giles-in-the-Fields, London, from about 1652.

He was deputed by presbyterians to congratulate Charles II at the Hague, 1660, at the time of the Restoration, and became chaplain to the king. He took part in the Savoy conference 1661, but was ejected for nonconformity at the time of the Act of Uniformity 1662.

When he died in 1682, he was the last of the surviving dissenting member of the Westminster Assembly.

== Works ==
- Correction, Instruction: or, A Treatise of Afflictions (1653)
- Imitation of the Saints opened in Practical Meditations (1666)
- Mount Pisgah: or, A Prospect of Heaven (1670).
