= Thomas Watson (Puritan) =

English Puritan and author, c. 1620–1686

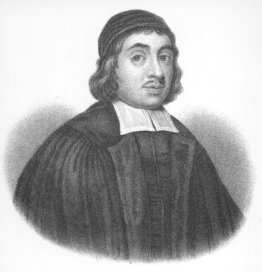
Thomas Watson

Thomas Watson (c. 1620–1686) was an English Puritan preacher and author. He was ejected from his London parish after the Restoration and the Act of Uniformity 1662, but continued to preach privately.

Watson was affiliated with the Cavalier faction in the English Civil War. From 1651 to 1652, he was imprisoned for taking part in a failed conspiracy to restore Charles II of England on the throne. During the actual Stuart Restoration, he was ejected from his position as a vicar due to his non-conformity.

== Education and career ==
He was educated at Emmanuel College, Cambridge, where he was noted for remarkably intense study. In 1646 he commenced a 16-year pastorate at St. Stephen's, Walbrook.

Watson showed strong Presbyterian views during the civil war, with, however, an attachment to the king, and in 1651 he was imprisoned briefly with some other ministers for his share in Christopher Love's plot to restore King Charles II of England. He was released on 30 June 1652, and was formally reinstated as vicar of St. Stephen's Walbrook. He obtained great fame and popularity as a preacher until the Restoration, when he was ejected for Nonconformity. Notwithstanding the rigor of the acts against dissenters, Watson continued to exercise his ministry privately as he found opportunity.

Upon the Declaration of Indulgence in 1672 he obtained a licence to preach at the great hall in Crosby House. Stephen Charnock served with him there from 1675 to 1680. After preaching there for several years, Watson's health gave way and he retired to Barnston, Essex, where he died suddenly, while praying in secret. He was buried on 28 July 1686.

== Family ==
In 1647, he married Abigail Beadle, daughter of Reverend John Beadle; they had at least seven children.

== Writing ==
Watson still has numerous titles available in print. His works include:

- All Things for Good (originally published as A Divine Cordial) ISBN 0-85151-478-2
- The Godly Man's Picture ISBN 0-85151-595-9
- The Ten Commandments ISBN 0-85151-146-5
- The Doctrine of Repentance ISBN 0-85151-521-5
- Sermons of Thomas Watson (a compilation) ISBN 1-877611-23-9
- A Plea for the Godly: And Other Sermons ISBN 1-877611-74-3
- The Duty of Self-Denial: (And 10 Other Sermons) ISBN 1-57358-015-5
- The Fight of Faith Crowned: The Remaining Sermons of Thomas Watson, Rector of St. Stephen's Walbrook, London ISBN 1-57358-047-3
- The Beatitudes ISBN 0-85151-035-3
- The Lord's Prayer ISBN 0-85151-145-7
- The Lord's Supper ISBN 0-85151-854-0
- The Art of Divine Contentment ISBN 1-57358-113-5
- Jerusalem's Glory: A Puritan's View of the Church ISBN 1-85792-569-6
- Heaven Taken by Storm: Showing the Holy Violence a Christian Is to Put Forth in the Pursuit After Glory ISBN 1-877611-50-6
- The Mischief of Sin ISBN 1-877611-85-9
- A Body of Divinity: Contained in Sermons upon the Westminster Assembly's Catechism ISBN 0-85151-383-2 and ISBN 1-58960-314-1
- Gleanings from Thomas Watson (a compilation) ISBN 1-57358-009-0
- Harmless as Doves: A Puritan's view of the Christian Life ISBN 1-85792-040-6
- The Great Gain of Godliness ISBN 978-1546812586
