= William Sclater (priest) =

English clergyman and controversialist

William Sclater (1575–1626) was an English clergyman and controversialist.

== Life ==
He was second son of Anthony Sclater, who is said to have held the benefice of Leighton Buzzard in Bedfordshire for fifty years, and to have died in 1620, aged 100. William Sclater was born at Leighton in October 1575. A king's scholar at Eton College, he was admitted scholar of King's College, Cambridge, on 24 August 1593, and three years later was admitted fellow of his college. He graduated M. A., and was admitted to priest's orders in 1599, shortly after which he left Cambridge and served a curacy at Walsall. The sermons he preached there on Romans (i-iii.) were printed in London in 1611, and passed to a second edition; they had a strong puritan bias.

On 4 September 1604 he was preferred to the rectory of Pitminster, Somerset; after some resistance, he accepted the ceremonies and the surplice which he had rejected in his former diocese. His piety secured him the patronage of Lady Elizabeth Poulett and her husband, John Poulett, 1st Baron Poulett, who in September 1619 preferred him to the living of Limpsham in Somerset; but Sclater suffered from bad health and returned to Pitminster, where he died in 1626.

== Works ==
Besides several volumes of sermons, Sclater was author of a number of exegetical and other works, which were published posthumously under the editorship of his son William. They included:

- An Exposition with Notes upon the First Epistle to the Thessalonians, Dedicated to the Right Honorable the Lord Stanhope Baron of Haringdon, 1619.
- A Key to the Key of Scripture: an Exposition, with Notes, upon the Epistle to the Romans (an enlargement of his previous discourses on Romans i-iii.), dedicated to Sir Henry Hawley, knt., and other Somerset gentlemen of puritan leanings, London, 1629.
- The Question of Tythes revised; Arguments for the Moralitie of Tything enlarged and cleared; Objections more fully and distinctly answered; Mr. Selden's Historie viewed, London, 1623; an expansion of a previous essay, called 'The Minister's Portion' (Oxford, 1612); this was an attempt to refute John Selden's historical work on tithes. It was praised by Edward Kellett, who described the proofs as unanswerable by 'sacrilegious church-robbers.'
- Utriusque Epistolae ad Corinthios Explicatio Analytica, Oxford, 1633.
- Commentary, with Notes, on the whole of Malachi, London, 1650.
