= Andrew Bromhall =

Andrew Bromhall (c 1608-1662), was an English divine.

== Life ==
Andrew Bromhall studied at Balliol College, Oxford gaining his MA in 1630. He was ordained deacon in Wells Cathedral in 1633.

Bromhall was one of the 'triers' for the county of Dorset commissioned in 1653-4 to eject immoral and inefficient ministers. He had been previously presented by the parliament to the substantial rectory of Maiden Newton, Dorset, then vacant by the sequestration of Matthew Osborn, M. A., or Edward Osbourn, A.M. Hutchins records that 'Bromhall died before the Restoration.' Calamy is apparently in error in stating that Bromhall was ejected from Maiden-Newton in 1662, and was afterwards resident in London.

== Works ==
He contributed Sermon xxvii. (probably preached before the Restoration) to the first volume (1661) of 'The Morning Exercises at Cripplegate, St. Giles-in-the-Fields, and in Southwark: being Divers Sermons preached A.D. MDCLIX-MDCLXXXIX by several Ministers of the Gospel in or near London,' 6 vols. London, fifth edition, 1844. He died shortly after and was buried on 6 March 1662 at St Margaret, Lothbury, City of London.

== Family ==
Bromhall's wife was named Frances, and she survived him by 23 years being buried at St Botolph Aldersgate in January 1685.

Their daughter Frances Bromhall married George Evelyn son of John Evelyn (1591–1664) on 15 August 1684.
