= Nathaniel Vincent =

English nonconformist minister

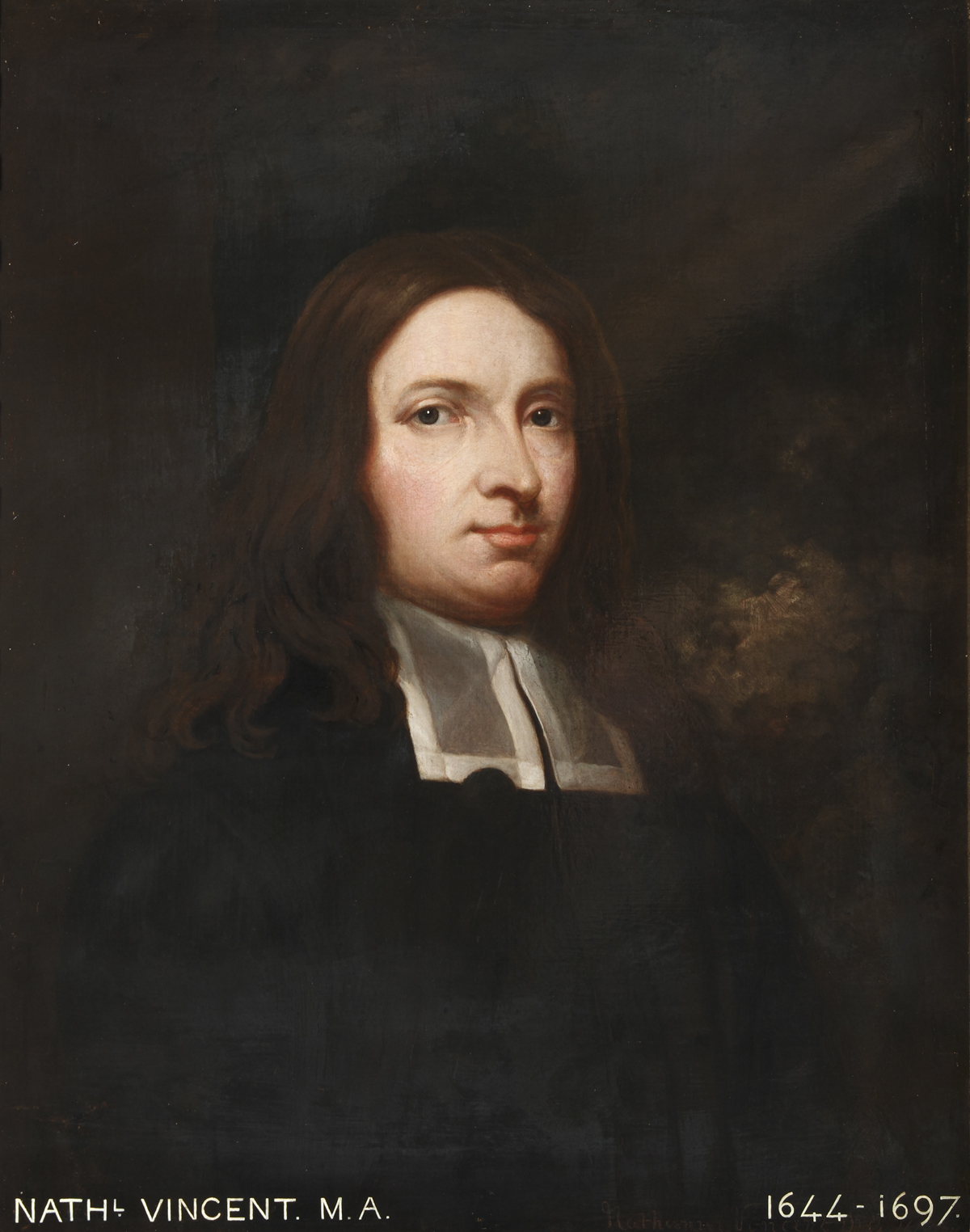
- Born: c. 1639; Probably Cornwall, England
- Died: 22 June 1697
- Resting place: Bunhill Fields, London
- Education: Corpus Christi College, Oxford; Christ Church, Oxford
- Occupations: Nonconformist minister and author
- Known for: Nonconformist preaching and devotional writing
- Spouse: Anna Vincent
- Children: 6
- Relatives: Thomas Vincent (brother)

Nathaniel Vincent (c. 1639? – 22 June 1697) was an English nonconformist minister, ejected in 1662 and several times imprisoned.

== Life ==
He was probably born in Cornwall about 1639, son of John Vincent (1591–1646), who was nominated by the committee of the Westminster Assembly to the rectory of Sedgefield, Durham. He was one of seven children and Thomas Vincent was one of his brothers. Nathaniel, the third son, entered Oxford University as a chorister on 18 October 1648, aged 10. He matriculated from Corpus Christi College on 28 March 1655, graduated B.A. from Christ Church, Oxford on 13 March 1656, M.A. on 11 June 1657, and was chosen chaplain of Corpus Christi College. He was appointed by Oliver Cromwell one of the first fellows of his Durham University, but never resided there.

At twenty he was preaching at Pulborough, Sussex, and at twenty-one was ordained and presented to the rectory of Langley Marish, Buckinghamshire. He was ejected in 1662 due to the Uniformity Act. He lived three years as chaplain to Sir Henry and Lady Blount at Tyttenhanger House, Hertfordshire. About 1666 Vincent went to London. There his preaching at once attracted attention, and a meeting-house was built for him in Farthing Alley, Southwark, where he gathered a congregation. In spite of fines and rough handling by soldiers sent to drag him from his pulpit, he continued preaching. In July 1670, soon after his marriage, he was confined in the Marshalsea prison. He was removed to the Gatehouse, Westminster, on 22 August. He remained six months in prison. In 1682 he was again arrested, brought before magistrates at Dorking, and sentenced to three years' imprisonment, after which he was to be banished the country. A flaw in the indictment meant after the section expenditure of £200. Vincent was released, but weakened by illness. He was again arrested in February 1686, this time on a charge of being concerned in Monmouth's rebellion. Some of his books were written in prison.

Vincent died suddenly on 22 June 1697, in the fifty-ninth year of his age. He was buried at Bunhill Fields. His funeral sermon was preached by Nathaniel Taylor. His wife Anna and six children were living in 1682. A daughter Anna married, on 4 December 1695, Dennis Herbert, jun., of London.

== Works ==
Vincent wrote:

- The Conversion of a Sinner Explained and Applied, London, 1669; with which was published The Day of Grace (same date).
- A Covert from the Storm, London, 1671, (written in prison).
- The Spirit of Prayer, London, 1674; republished, 1677; 5th edit. 1699; other edits. Saffron Walden, ed. J. H. Hopkins, 1815, London, 1825.
- A Heaven or Hell upon Earth, London, 1676.
- The Little Child's Catechism, whereunto is added several Short Histories, 1681.
- The True Touchstone, London, 1681.
- The More Excellent Way, London, 1684.
- The right notion of honour, 1685.
- A Warning given to secure Sinners, London, 1688.
- The Principles of the Doctrine of Christ: a Catechism, London, 1691.
- A Present for such as have been Sick (sermons preached after his recovery from sickness), London, 1693.
- The Cure of Distractions in attending upon God
- The Love of the World cured
- Worthy Walking
- The Doctrine of Conversion (The dates of the last four do not appear.)

Sermons by Vincent are in Samuel Annesley's Continuation of Morning Exercises, London, 1683, and in his Casuistical Morning Exercises, London, 1690; reprinted in vols. iv., v., and vi. of Nichols's edition, London, 1814–5. Vincent was much in request for preaching funeral sermons; five or six were printed in quarto. He edited the Morning Exercise against Popery (London, 1675), twenty-five sermons preached in his pulpit at Southwark by visiting divines.
