= Jeremiah Whitaker =

English Puritan clergyman

Jeremiah Whitaker (1599–1654) was an English Puritan clergyman, and important member of the Westminster Assembly.

== Life ==
He was born at Wakefield, Yorkshire, in 1599. After being educated at the grammar school there under the Rev. Philip Jack, he entered Sidney Sussex College, Cambridge, as a sizar in 1615, two years before Oliver Cromwell. In 1619 he graduated in arts, and for a time was a schoolmaster at Oakham, Rutland.

In 1630 he was made rector of Stretton, Rutland; and on the ejection of Thomas Paske from the rectory of St Mary Magdalen, Bermondsey, in 1644, Whitaker was chosen in his stead. He was an oriental scholar, and preached, when in London, four times a week. When the Westminster Assembly was convened in June 1643, he was one of the first members elected, and in 1647 was appointed its moderator. In the same year he was chosen by the House of Lords, along with Thomas Goodwin, to examine and superintend the assembly's publications.

In 1648, he was one of the 58 people to sign A Vindication of the Ministers of the Gospel In & About London from the Unjust Aspersions Cast Upon Their Former Actings for the Parliament.

Whitaker died on 1 June 1654, and was buried in the chancel of St Mary Magdalen.

== Family ==
While at Oakham he married Chephtzibah, daughter of William Peachey, a puritan minister of Oakham. William Whitaker (1629–1672) was his son.
