= Simeon Ashe =

English nonconformist clergyman

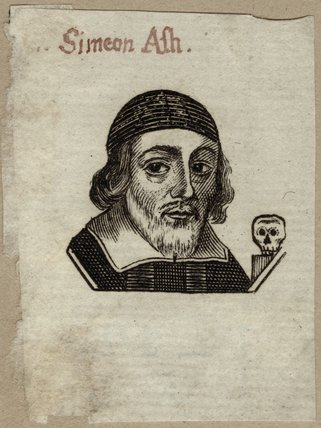
Simeon Ashe

Simeon Ashe or Ash (died 1662) was an English nonconformist clergyman, a member of the Westminster Assembly and chaplain to the Parliamentary leader Edward Montagu, 2nd Earl of Manchester.

== Life ==
He was educated at Emmanuel College, Cambridge. He began his career as minister in Staffordshire, but was ejected from his living on account of his refusal to read the Book of Sports and to conform to other ceremonies. On his dismissal Sir John Burgoyne befriended him and allowed him the use of an 'exempt' church at Wroxhall; and he was afterwards under the protection of Robert Greville, 2nd Baron Brooke. He was a regular Sunday preacher at Warwick Castle, and friend of Thomas Dugard.

When the First English Civil War broke out, he became chaplain to the Earl of Manchester. At the close of the war he received the living of St. Austin, and was also one of the Cornhill lecturers. He was nominated to the Westminster assembly after the death in 1643 of Josias Shute.

Although he had joined the side of the parliament, Ashe was strongly opposed to the extreme party of the Cromwellians; and when the time was ripe for the English Restoration he was among the divines who went to Breda to meet Charles II of England. He died a few days before the passing of the Act of Uniformity, and was buried on 24 August 1662. Had he lived to see the passing of the act, he would have vacated his living. Ashe was a man of some property, and while he held the living of St. Austin, his house was always open to his clerical brethren. Walker charges him with exercising severity against the conforming clergy.

== Works ==
In 1644 he joined with William Goode, another chaplain of the Earl of Manchester, in writing a pamphlet entitled A particular Relation of the most Remarkable Occurrences from the United Forces in the North. This was followed by another pamphlet, for which Ashe alone was responsible, entitled A True Relation of the most Chiefe Occurrences at and since the late Battell at Newbery. The writer's object in both cases was to vindicate the conduct of his patron. In John Vicars's Parliamentary Chronicle there is a letter of his, describing the proceedings of the Earl of Manchester in reducing several garrisons after the battle of Marston Moor.

Ashe was the author of sermons, including

- 'A Sermon on Ps. ix. 9,' preached before the House of Commons on 30 March 1642.
- 'A Sermon before the House of Lords,' 26 Feb. 1644.
- 'A Funeral Sermon on the Death of the Countess of Manchester,' 12 Oct. 1658, &c.

He also edited some treatises of John Ball, John Brinsley, Ralph Robinson, and others.
