= Great Ejection =

1662 purge of Puritan ministers in the Church of England

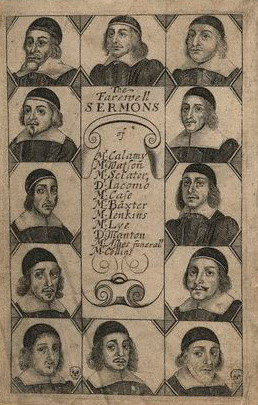
Title page of a collection of Farewell Sermons preached by ministers ejected from their parishes in 1662

The Great Ejection followed the Act of Uniformity 1662 in England. Several thousand Puritan ministers were forced out of their positions in the Church of England following the Restoration of Charles II. It was a consequence (not necessarily an intended one) of the Savoy Conference of 1661.

== History ==
The Act of Uniformity prescribed that any minister who refused to conform to the 1662 Book of Common Prayer by St Bartholomew's Day (24 August) 1662 should be ejected from the Church of England. This date became known as "Black Bartholomew's Day" among Dissenters, a reference to the fact that it occurred on the same day as the 1572 St Bartholomew's Day massacre of French Protestants. Oliver Heywood estimated the number of ministers ejected at 2,500. This included James Ashurst, Richard Baxter, Edmund Calamy the Elder, Simeon Ashe, Thomas Case, John Flavel, William Jenkyn, Joseph Caryl, Benjamin Needler, Thomas Brooks, Thomas Manton, William Sclater, Thomas Doolittle, and Thomas Watson. Biographical details of ejected ministers were later collected by the historian Edmund Calamy, grandson of Calamy the elder.

Although there had already been ministers outside the established church, the Great Ejection created an abiding concept of Nonconformity. Strict religious tests of the Clarendon Code and other Penal Laws left a substantial section of English society excluded from public affairs and university degrees for a century and a half.

== Historiography ==
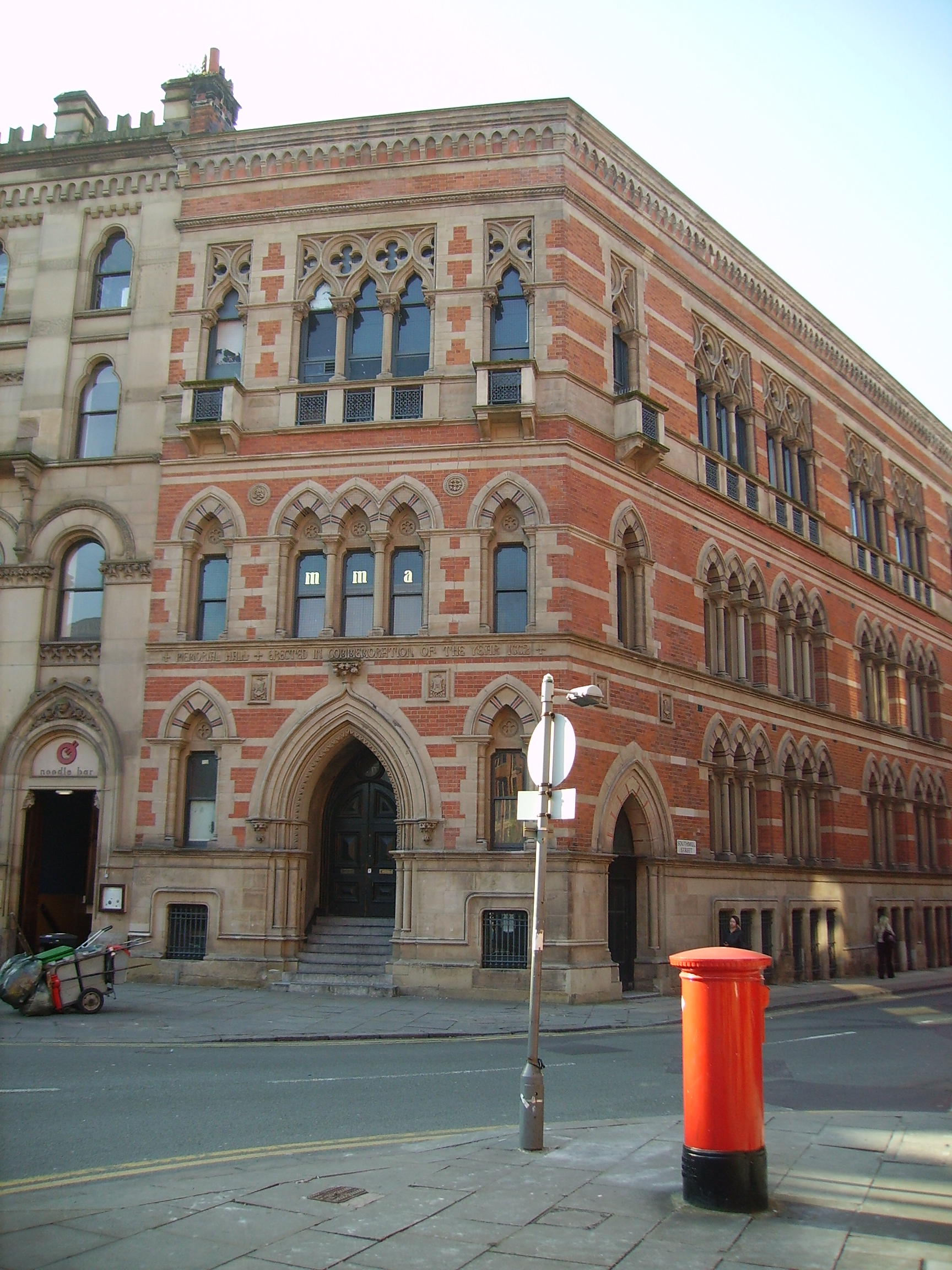
The Memorial Hall on Albert Square, Manchester, built to commemorate the bicentennial of the Great Ejection, at the suggestion of John Relly Beard

The bicentennial in 1862 led to a sharp debate, with the Nonconformist agenda being questioned, and the account in Calamy being reviewed.

Iain Murray argues that the issue was deeper than "phrases in the Book of Common Prayer and forms of church order", but regarded the "nature of true Christianity".

The Memorial Hall on Albert Square, Manchester and the Congregational Memorial Hall in Farringdon Street, London, were built to commemorate the bicentennial of the Great Ejection.

== Legacy ==
The Bishop of Liverpool, J. C. Ryle (1816–1900), referred to the Ejection as an "injury to the cause of true religion in England which will probably never be repaired".

A Service of Reconciliation was held at Westminster Abbey on 7 February 2012 to mark the 350th anniversary of the Great Ejection. Rowan Williams, then Archbishop of Canterbury, preached at the service which was attended by clergy and laity of the Church of England and the United Reformed Church.

== See also ==
- History of the Puritans from 1649
- Dissenting academies
- English Presbyterianism
- Category:Ejected English ministers of 1662
