= Thomas Manton (minister) =

English Puritan

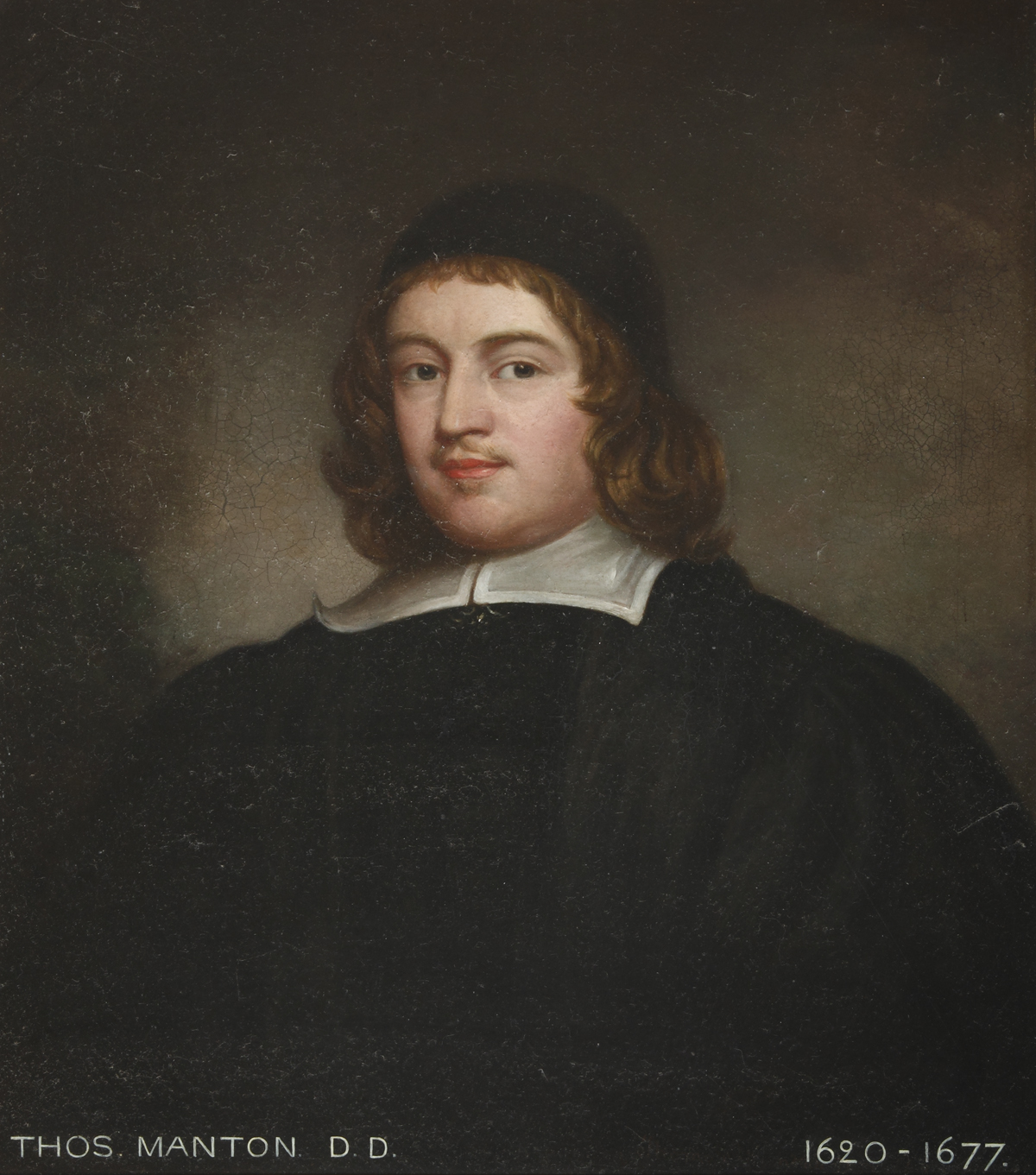
Thomas Manton.

Thomas Manton (1620–1677) was an English Puritan clergyman. He was a clerk to the Westminster Assembly and a chaplain to Oliver Cromwell.

== Early life ==
Thomas Manton was baptised 31 March 1620 at Lydeard St Lawrence, Somerset, a remote southwestern portion of England. His grammar school education was possibly at Blundell's School, in Tiverton, Devon. His formal education came at Wadham College, University of Oxford, and he eventually graduated BA in 1639 from Hart Hall. Joseph Hall, bishop of Norwich, ordained him deacon the following year: he never took priest's orders, holding that he was properly ordained to the ministerial office.

== Ministries ==
Manton was appointed town lecturer of Sowton, Devon, where he served from 1640 to 1643. He was town lecturer at Colyton, Devon, from 1643 to 1645.

In July 1645, he moved from the rural western counties to the London area, as Colonel Alexander Popham, the patron of St. Mary's parish, brought him east to the tiny town of Stoke Newington, in Middlesex county, outside London proper. Here he began his major mid-week lectures, first on Isaiah 53 (mid-1640s), then on James (end of the 1640s), and finally on Jude (late 1640s–early 1650s). While at Stoke Newington he was invited to preach before Parliament for the first of at least six occasions on 30 June 1647, which was a fast day for Parliament. His sermon was based on Zechariah 14:9 and entitled, "Meat out of the Eater; or, Hopes of Unity in and by Divided and Distracted Times." Exactly one year later, on 30 June 1648, he preached another fast sermon on Revelation 3:20, "England's Spiritual Languishing; with the Causes and the Cure." He also participated in the Westminster Assembly as one of three clerks, was later appointed to write a preface to the second edition of the Westminster Confession in 1658, and served Oliver Cromwell as a chaplain and a trier (an overseeing body that examined men for the ministry).

In 1656, he moved to London as he was appointed as a lecturer at Westminster Abbey and most importantly as rector of St. Paul's, Covent Garden, succeeding Obadiah Sedgwick. During this time Cromwell died and England entered a period of great uncertainty. This led Presbyterians such as Manton to call for the restoration of Charles II in 1660, travelling along with others to Breda, The Netherlands, to negotiate his return. After Charles returned, Manton was part of the negotiations called the Savoy Conference, in which the scruples of the Presbyterians and Congregationalists concerning the Prayer Book were formally discussed. Yet since the Cavalier Parliament was filled with Laudians, 1662 saw the enactment of the Act of Uniformity 1662. All ministers were to be ordained or re-ordained by a bishop, they were to renounce the Solemn League and Covenant, promise loyalty to the Prayer Book, and subscribe the Thirty-Nine Articles. Since Manton was on favourable terms with Charles II he was offered the Deanery of Rochester, but he refused on conscience grounds.

== Post-Ejection (1662–1677) ==
Manton's last years were tumultuous. The Act of Uniformity led to the "Great Ejection." On 17 August 1662, Manton preached his last sermon at Covent Garden on Hebrews 12:1. Then on 24 August 1662, he resigned his living (pastorate) with almost 2,000 other Puritans in protest. Despite his lack of patronage, he continued to preach at home on King Street in Covent Garden. He also continued to write even when imprisoned for refusing to cooperate for six months in 1670 in violation of the Conventicle Act. 1672 saw the Declaration of Indulgence, in which men like Manton were granted a licence to preach at home. Manton then became a lecturer at Pinner's Hall for the so-called "morning exercises." Parliament, though, revoked this Indulgence the year after. Manton later died on 18 October 1677, and was survived by his wife and three children.

== Works ==
Although Manton is little known now, in his day he was held in as much esteem as men like John Owen. He was best known for his skilled expository preaching, and was a favourite of John Charles Ryle, who championed his republication in the mid-19th century, and Charles Spurgeon. Of Manton, Ryle said he was "a man who could neither say, nor do, nor write anything without being observed." Spurgeon said his works contained "a mighty mountain of sound theology" and his sermons were "second to none" to his contemporaries. He went on to say, "Manton is not brilliant, but he is always clever; he is not oratorical, but he is powerful; he is not striking, but he is deep." His finest work is probably his Exposition of James.

- One hundred and ninety sermons on the hundred and nineteenth Psalm (Volume 1) OL 23323172M
- One hundred and ninety sermons on the hundred and nineteenth Psalm (Volume 2) OL 23323172M
- One hundred and ninety sermons on the hundred and nineteenth Psalm (Volume 3) OL 23323172M
- A practical commentary, or, An exposition with notes upon the Epistle of James : delivered in sundry weekly lectures at Stoke-Newington in Middlesex, near London (1657) OL ia:practi00mant
- A practical commentary, or, an exposition with notes on the Epistle of James; delivered in Sunday weekly lectures at Stoke-Newington in Middlesex, near London (1842 printing) OL 7212372M
- A practical commentary, or, An exposition with notes on the Epistle of James : delivered in sundry weekly lectures at Stoke-Newington in Middlesex, near London (1653) OL ia:comment00mant

=== Complete works ===
- The complete works of Thomas Manton, D.D. : with memoir of the author (vol 1) https://archive.org/details/completeworksoft01mantuoft
  - Memoir by Rev. Dr. Harris.
  - A Practical Exposition of the Lord's Prayer.
  - On Christ's Temptation and Transfiguration.
  - On Redemption by Christ and his Eternal Existence.
- The complete works of Thomas Manton, D.D. : with memoir of the author (vol 2) https://archive.org/details/completeworksoft02mantuoft
  - An Estimate of Manton, by the Rev. J. C. Ryle, B.A.
  - Several Discourses Tending to Promote Peace and Holiness.
  - Twenty Sermons on Important Passages of Scripture.
  - Farewell and Funeral Sermons.
- The complete works of Thomas Manton, D.D. : with memoir of the author (Volume 3) https://archive.org/details/completeworksoft03mantuoft
  - Eighteen Sermons on the Description, Rise, Growth, and Fall of Antichrist; and
  - A Practical Exposition Upon the Fifty-Third Chapter of Isaiah.
- The complete works of Thomas Manton, D.D. : with memoir of the author (Volume 4) https://archive.org/details/completeworksoft04mantuoft
  - A Practical Commentary, or an Exposition, with Notes, on the Epistle of James.
- The complete works of Thomas Manton, D.D. : with memoir of the author (Volume 5) *https://archive.org/details/completeworksoft05mantuoft
  - A Practical Commentary; or, an Exposition, with Notes, on the Epistle of Jude.
  - Meat Out of the Eater. England's Spiritual Languishing, its Causes and Cure.
  - Sermons at Morning Exercise. Preface to Smectymnuus Redivivus.
- The complete works of Thomas Manton, D.D. : with memoir of the author (Volume 6) https://archive.org/details/completeworksoft06mantuoft
  - Several Sermons Upon the CXIX Psalm.
- The complete works of Thomas Manton, D.D. : with memoir of the author (Volume 7) https://archive.org/details/completeworksoft07mantuoft
  - Several Sermons Upon the CXIX Psalm.
- The complete works of Thomas Manton, D.D. : with memoir of the author (Volume 8) https://archive.org/details/completeworksoft08mantuoft
  - Several Sermons Upon the CXIX Psalm.
- The complete works of Thomas Manton, D.D. : with memoir of the author (Volume 9) https://archive.org/details/completeworksoft09mantuoft
  - Several Sermons Upon the CXIX Psalm;
  - Several Sermons Upon the Twenty-Fifth Chapter of St. Matthew.
- The complete works of Thomas Manton, D.D. : with memoir of the author (Volume 10) https://archive.org/details/completeworksoft10mantuoft
  - Several Sermons Upon the Twenty-Fifth Chapter of St. Matthew; also
  - Sermons Upon the Seventeenth Chapter of St John.
- The complete works of Thomas Manton, D.D. : with memoir of the author (Volume 11) https://archive.org/details/completeworksoft11mantuoft
  - Sermons Upon the Seventeenth Chapter of St John; also
  - Sermons Upon the Sixth and Eighth Chapters of Romans.
- The complete works of Thomas Manton, D.D. : with memoir of the author (Volume 12) https://archive.org/details/completeworkoft12mantuoft
  - Sermons Upon the Eighth Chapter of Romans.; also
  - Sermons Upon 2 Corinthians V.
- The complete works of Thomas Manton, D.D. : with memoir of the author (Volume 13) https://archive.org/details/completeworksoft13mantuoft
  - Several Sermons Upon 2 Corinthians V; and
  - Sermons Upon Hebrews XI.
- The complete works of Thomas Manton, D.D. : with memoir of the author (Volume 14) https://archive.org/details/completeworksoft14mantuoft
  - Several Sermons Upon Hebrews XI.
- The complete works of Thomas Manton, D.D. : with memoir of the author (Volume 15) https://archive.org/details/completeworksoft15mantuoft
  - Several Sermons Upon Hebrews XI;
  - Treatises on the Life of Faith and on Self-Denial; also
  - Several Sermons Preached on Public Occasions.
- The complete works of Thomas Manton, D.D. : with memoir of the author (Volume 16) https://archive.org/details/completeworksoft16mantuoft
  - Sermons on Several Texts of Scripture.
- The complete works of Thomas Manton, D.D. : with memoir of the author (Volume 17) https://archive.org/details/completeworksoft17mantuoft
  - Sermons on Several Texts of Scripture.
- The complete works of Thomas Manton, D.D. : with memoir of the author (Volume 18) https://archive.org/details/completeworksoft18mantuoft
  - Sermons on Several Texts of Scripture.
- The complete works of Thomas Manton, D.D. : with memoir of the author (Volume 19) https://archive.org/details/completeworksoft19mantuoft
  - Sermons on Several Texts of Scripture.
- The complete works of Thomas Manton, D.D. : with memoir of the author (Volume 20) https://archive.org/details/compleeteworksoft20mantuoft
  - Sermons on Several Texts of Scripture.
- The complete works of Thomas Manton, D.D. : with memoir of the author (Volume 21) https://archive.org/details/completeworksoft21mantuoft OL 7033776M
  - Sermons on Several Texts of Scripture.
- The complete works of Thomas Manton, D.D. : with memoir of the author (Volume 22) https://archive.org/details/completeworkoft22mantuoft
  - Sermons on Several Texts of Scripture; together with
  - Copious Indexes of Subjects and Texts to Dr Manton's Works.
