= Honey Lane Market =

Former market in the City of London

Coordinates: 51.5143°N 0.0936°W

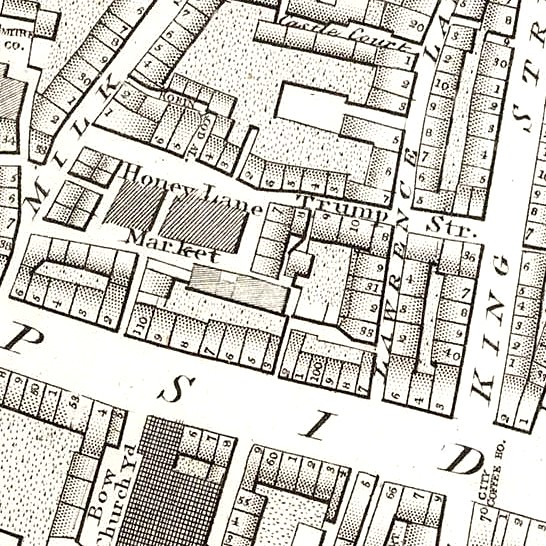
Honey Lane Market on Richard Horwood's 1799 map.

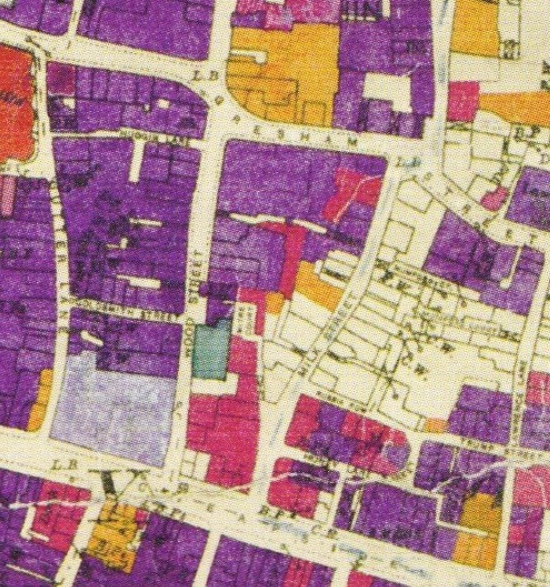
London Blitz bomb damage map, c. 1945 (purple: damaged beyond repair; scarlet: seriously damaged, doubtful if repairable; other colours: lower levels of damage)

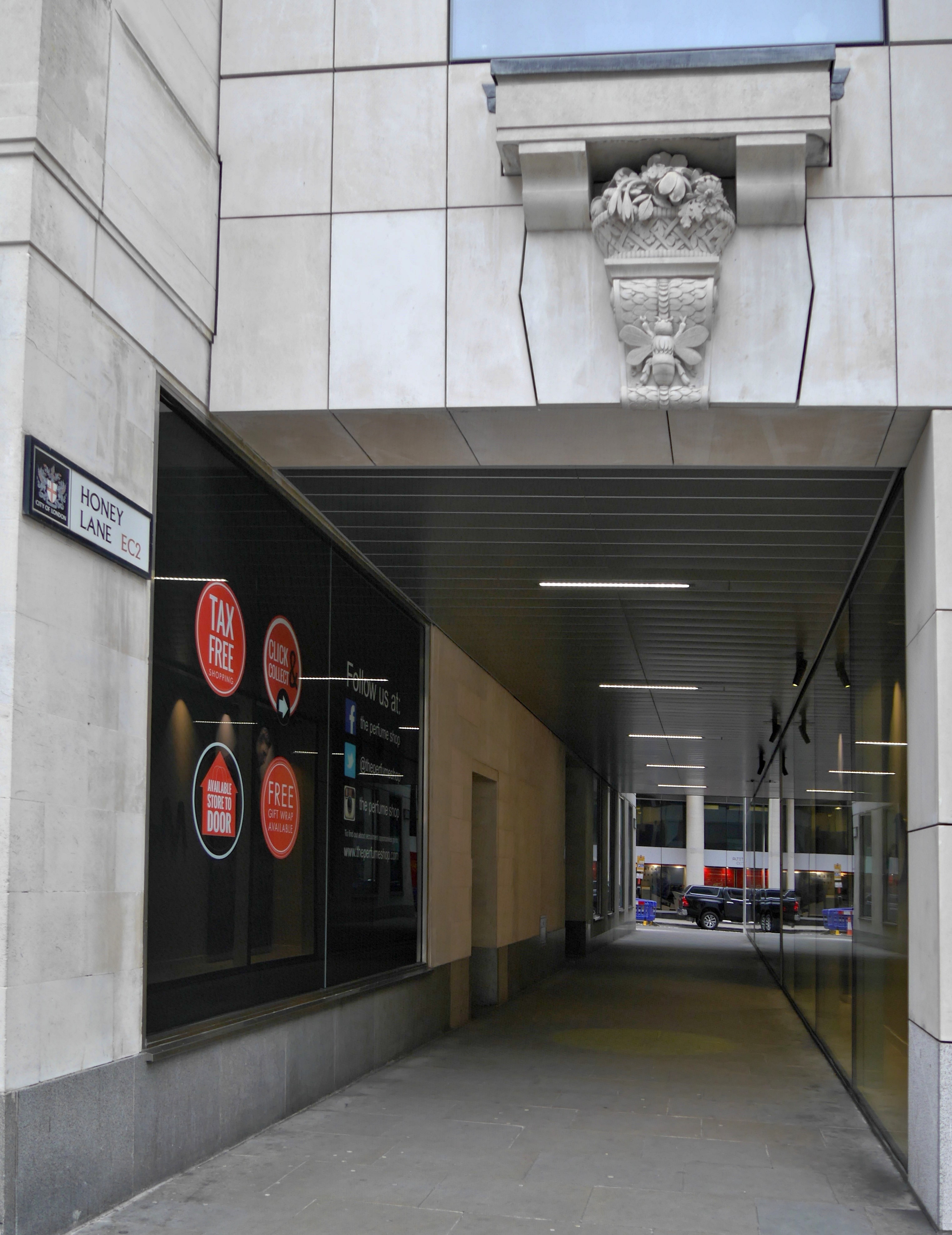
Honey Lane, slightly east of the original.

Honey Lane Market was a historic market near Cheapside in the City of London.

It was at the south end of Milk Street on the site of the parish church of St Mary Magdalen and All Hallows Honey Lane after the areas destruction in the Great Fire of London in 1666, and the market took over the area. The market at one time had 105 butchers' stalls. Edward Hatton said in 1708 that the market was known for its meat, fish, and poultry.

By 1835 the City of London School was built on part of the market site facing Milk Street on the corner with Russia Row. It was paid for with money bequeathed for the purpose by John Carpenter, city clerk in the reign of King Henry V. The school grew rapidly and in 1883 it moved to larger quarters on the Victoria Embankment.

It was said in 1927 that the market "retains much of its original semi-enclosed plan". There were many food shops, "though wholesale premises are gradually encroaching on the space".

Honey Lane was completely destroyed and the surrounding area seriously damaged by German bombing on 29 December 1940.

In the postwar reconstruction the market fell within a parcel of land (along with Milk Street Buildings, Freeman's Court, Trump Street and Lawrence Lane) covering 53,434 square feet, referred to as No. 11. The cost of reconstruction of the parcel of land was estimated at £520,500 (in 1952) with costs to tax payers turned into a surplus by 2013.

Honey Lane, a breezeway, is approximately 100 feet east of the old one and connects Cheapside and Trump Street.

== See also ==
- All Hallows Honey Lane
