= 30 Gresham Street =

Office building in the City of London, England

Coordinates: 51.5151°N 0.0931°W

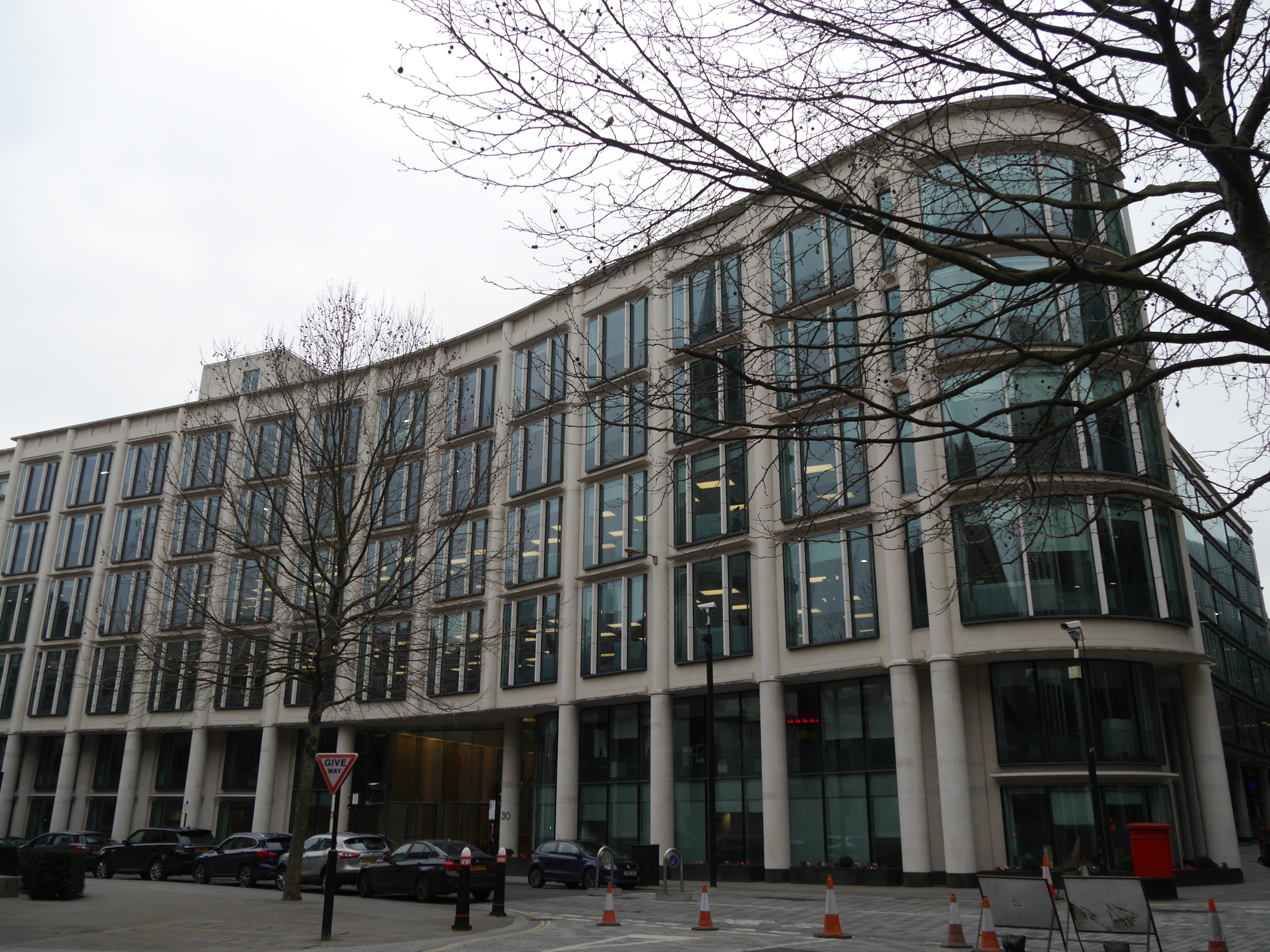
30 Gresham Street, January 2018

30 Gresham Street is an office building in Gresham Street in the City of London of 386,000 sq ft developed by Land Securities in 2002-03 and occupied by Commerzbank, Investec Bank and Rathbones. When built, it was described as "the biggest speculative office development in the capital." The building is bounded in the south by Russia Row and Trump Street, in the east by Lawrence Lane, and in the west by Milk Street. It is on the site of the former Blossom's Inn as well as a number of other small alleys and courts such as Robin Hood Court, Russia Court, Mumford Court and Castle Court.

It replaced an earlier building of the same name which became known as the "Night Club in the City."

It was the site of an excavation of Roman remains (Londinium) by the Museum of London, which was covered by a Time Team special in 2002.
