= Milk Street =

Milk Street may refer to:

- Milk Street, London
- Milk Street, Boston
  - Milk Street (MBTA station), now State station

== See also ==
- Christopher Kimball's Milk Street
