= St Mary Magdalen, Milk Street =

- St Mary Magdalen, Milk Street
- Location: City of London
- Country: England
- Denomination: Roman Catholic, later Church of England

Architecture
- Completed: 12th century
- Closed: 1666
- Demolished: 1666

Administration
- Diocese: London
- Parish: Cripplegate

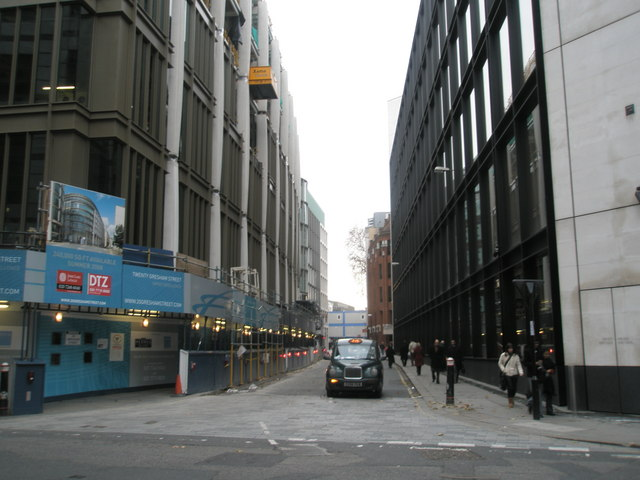
Looking down Wood Street, which is about 100 metres west of Milk Street

St Mary Magdalen, Milk Street, was a parish church in the City of London, England, dedicated to Jesus' companion Mary Magdalene. Originally constructed in the 12th century, it was destroyed in the Great Fire of London in 1666 and not rebuilt. The location was converted into a market, then from 1835 to 1879 was the site of the City of London School.

== Location ==
The church stood on the east side of Milk Street, London, the site of London's medieval milk market, located north of Cheapside, in Cripplegate, with part of the parish in Bread Street. In his 'Survey' of 1603, John Stow described it as having "many fair houses for wealthy merchants and others".

== History ==
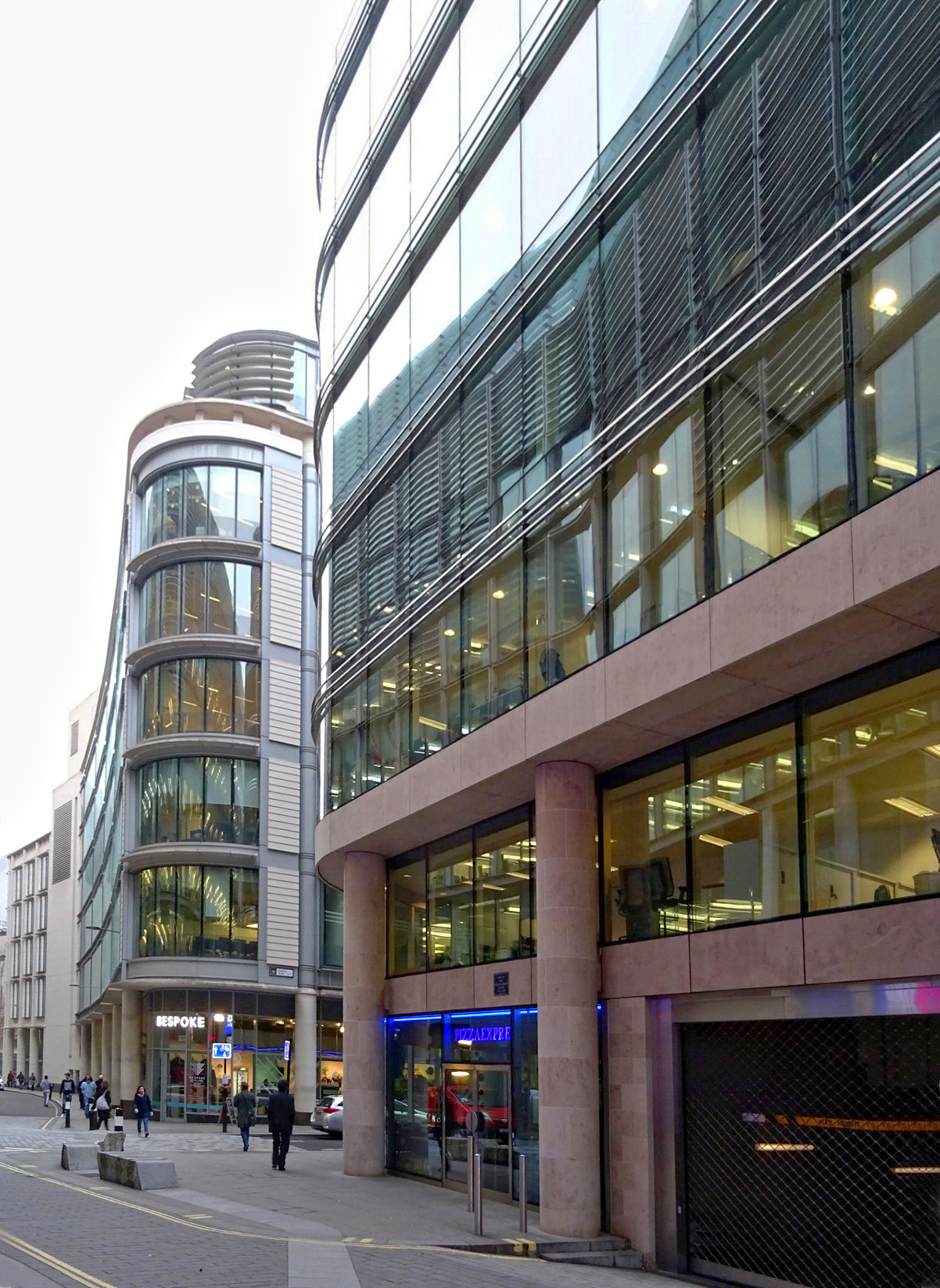
Modern Milk Street; the site of the church was on the right, before the entrance to Russia Row

The earliest mention of "St. Mary Magdalene in foro Londoniarum" was in 1162, and it is recorded as "St. Mary Magdalene, Milk Street" in a document dating from between 1203 and 1215. Writing in 1603, Stow notes it was a small church that had recently been repaired, while it was further updated in 1619 and 1630.

The church was a Presbyterian stronghold in the years before the Wars of the Three Kingdoms. In 1643 Thomas Case became the first London clergyman to host Morning Exercises, a special service set aside to pray for those fighting in the Parliamentarian army. Like many Presbyterians, Case objected to the execution of Charles I in January 1649 and was deprived of his position in 1650. His replacement Thomas Vincent continued the Presbyterian tradition in the parish until being removed for failing to comply with the Act of Uniformity on 24 August 1662.

After the church was destroyed in the 1666 Great Fire of London, the parish was combined with that of St Lawrence Jewry. The original site, together with that of All Hallows Honey Lane and several houses, was acquired by the City of London, and converted into a marketplace, named Honey Lane Market. In 1835, the Corporation of London used part of the site to build the first City of London School. Much of the area was destroyed during The Blitz on 29 December 1940; it was subsequently rebuilt and none of the original buildings survive.

== Notable personages ==
Sir Thomas More, Lord Chancellor from 1529 to 1532, then later executed by Henry VIII in 1535 for opposing his split from the Catholic Church, was born in Milk Street in February 1478. It has been suggested he was probably baptised at St Mary Magdalen, which was his local church.

Notable Parish priests included Francis Fletcher who resigned in July 1576 to join Francis Drake in his three-year circumnavigation of the world. James Speight, father of the feminist poet Rachel Speght (sic), held the position from 1592 to 1637.

Stow lists a number of important burials, such as Sir William Cantilo of the Worshipful Company of Mercers who died in 1462. He also records several Lord Mayors of London, including John Olney (Mayor in 1446, died 1475), Sir John Browne (mayor in 1480; d. 1497), Sir William Browne (Mayor in 1513, died during his term of office), Sir Thomas Exmewe (Mayor in 1517, d. 1528), and Thomas Skinner (Mayor in 1596). He further notes that "Henry Cantlow, Mercer, merchant of the Staple", built a chapel in the church and was buried there in 1495. Hughes confirms the church records contain the names of many important City of London dignitaries.

Others included Doctor Thomas Moundeford (1550–1630), a longtime resident of Milk Street, six times President of the Royal College of Physicians, and personal physician to Arbella Stuart. Another was his wife Mary Moundeford (née Hill), who died aged 94 in 1656 and was godparent to Rachel Speght, who dedicated her poem Mortalities Memorandum to her. The regicide Sir John Bourchier died nearby whilst awaiting trial, and was interred in the church graveyard in August 1660.

== Sources ==
- Ackroyd, Peter (1998). The Life of Thomas More. Doubleday. ISBN 978-0385477093.
- Archer, Jayne Elizabeth (2010). Long, Kathleen P (ed.). Women and Chymistry in Early Modern England; the Manuscript Receipt Book (circa 1616) of Sarah Wigge in "Gender and Scientific Discourse in Early Modern Culture". Ashgate Publishing Company. ISBN 978-0754669715.
- Harben, H (1918). A Dictionary of London. Herbert Jenkins.
- Hennessy, George (1898). Novam repertorium ecclesiasticum Londonense. S. Sonnenschein.
- Huelin, Gordon (1996). Vanished Churches of the City of London. Guildhall Library Publishing. ISBN 0-900422-42-4.
- Hughes, AW (1941). The register of St. Lawrence Jewry and St. Mary Magdalen, Milk Street, London: 1677-1812. Harleian Society.
- Keene, D.; Harding, V. (1987). All Hallows Honey Lane in "Historical gazetteer of London before the Great Fire 1, Cheapside: Parishes of All Hallows Honey Lane, St.Martin Pomary, St. Mary le Bow, St. Mary Colechurch, and St. Pancras Soper Lane". Chadwyck-Healey. ISBN 0-85964-190-2.
- Lynch, Beth (2008). "Vincent, Thomas (1634–1678))". Oxford Dictionary of National Biography (online ed.). Oxford University Press. doi:10.1093/ref:odnb/28315. (Subscription, Wikipedia Library access or UK public library membership required.)
- Mullet, Michael (2004). "Case, Thomas (1598-1682)". Oxford Dictionary of National Biography (online ed.). Oxford University Press. doi:10.1093/ref:odnb/4855. (Subscription, Wikipedia Library access or UK public library membership required.)
- Neal, Daniel. "The Morning Exercise at Cripplegate". Gospel Heritage Literature.
- Scott, David (2004). "Bourchier, Sir John (1595-1660". Oxford Dictionary of National Biography (online ed.). Oxford University Press. doi:10.1093/ref:odnb/2991. (Subscription, Wikipedia Library access or UK public library membership required.)
- Smith, Al (1970). Milk Street, EC2 in Dictionary of City of London Street Names. David & Charles. ISBN 978-0668023269.
- Speight, Helen (2002). "Rachel Speght's Polemical Life". Huntington Library Quarterly. 65 (3/4): 449–463. JSTOR 3817984.
- Stow, John (1908). Kingsford, CL (ed.). A Survey of London. Oxford University Press.
