= Trump Street =

Street in the City of London

Coordinates: 51°30′52″N 0°05′33″W

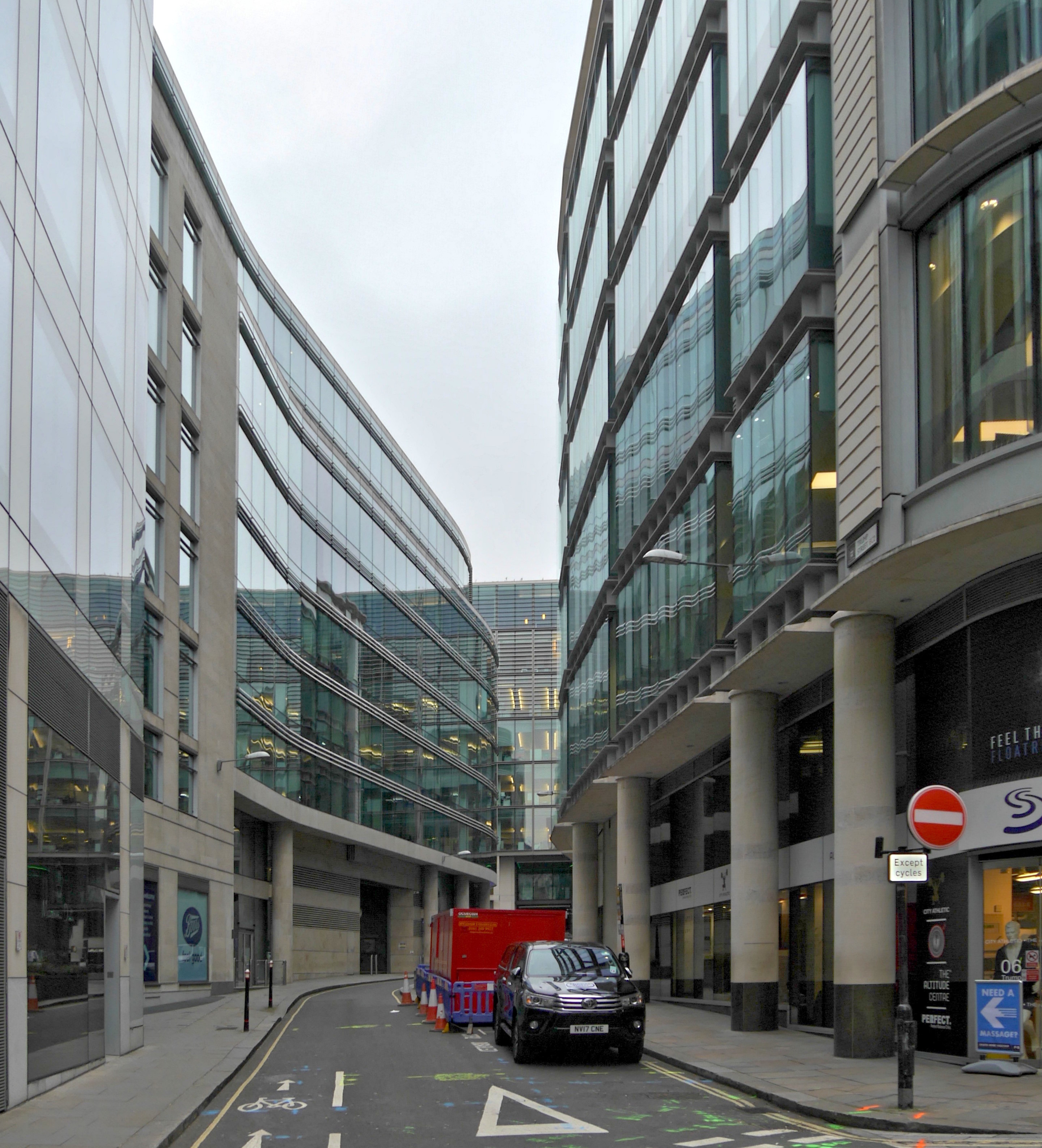
Trump Street, looking west from the junction with Lawrence Lane, January 2018

Trump Street is a street in the City of London that was originally known as Trumpadere Street, probably after the trumpet or horn makers who once worked there or in the adjacent Trump Alley (now demolished). It was built after the Great Fire of London (1666) but completely destroyed by bombing during the Second World War and has since been entirely rebuilt.

== Location ==
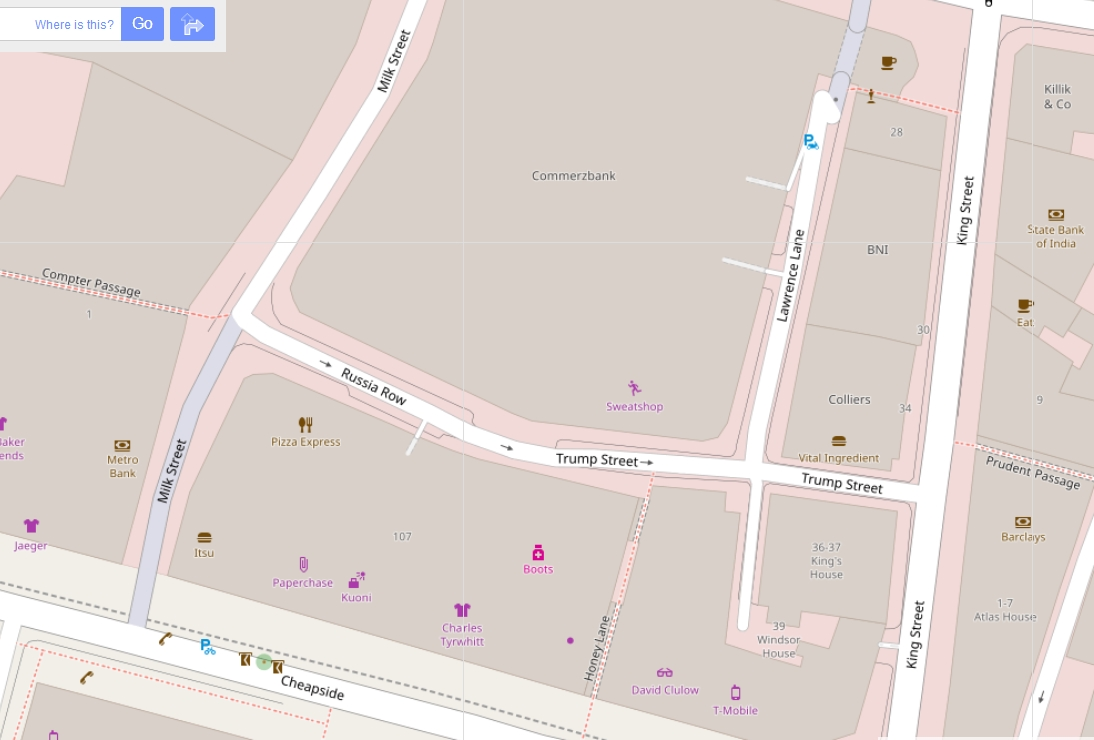
Vicinity of Trump Street

Trump Street runs between Russia Row and King Street. The pedestrianised Honey Lane runs from the south side to join it to Cheapside. It is crossed only by Lawrence Lane.

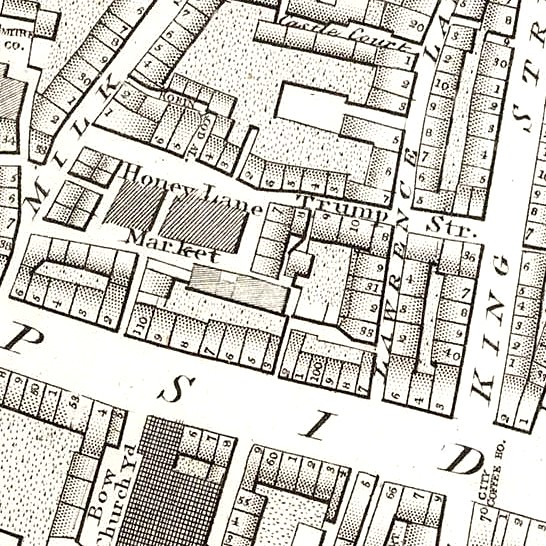
Trump Street on Richard Horwood's 1799 map, with Honey Lane Market where Russia Row is now

Freeman's Court, originally known as Trump Alley, once ran between Lawrence Lane and Honey Lane immediately to the south of and parallel with Trump Street.

== Origins ==
Trump Street, originally known as Trumpadere Street, was built after the Great Fire of London in 1666. John Strype called it Duke Street in 1720.

The street may be named after Trump Alley or named because its occupants had the same occupation as those that lived in the alley. Henry Riley writes in his Memorials of the inscription on the coffin of Godefrey le Trompour and of trumpeters generally that:

The persons who followed this trade mostly lived, in all probability, in Trump Street, formerly Trump Alley (a much longer street then than it now is), near the Guildhall; their principal customers not improbably being the City waits, or watchmen; each of whom was provided with a trumpet, also known as a "wait," for sounding the hours of the watch, and giving the alarm. In reference to this trade it deserves remark, that the only memorial that has come down to us of the Chapel of St. Mary the Virgin, and of St. Mary Magdalen and All Saints, formerly adjoining the Guildhall, is a massive stone coffin (now in the Library at Guildhall), with its lid, whereon is sculptured a cross between two trumpets, and around its margin the following inscription:—Godefrey le Trompour : gist : ci : Deu : del : ealme : eit : merci. "Godefrey the Trompour lies here, God on the soul have mercy." In Trump Alley, close adjoining, he probably lived, sold trumpets, and died;—if we may judge from the character of the writing, in the latter half of the 14th century.

Henry Harben considered that Riley was wrong to believe that Trump Alley and Trump Street were synonymous.

Trump Street was recorded by the cartographer John Rocque in 1746, and The London Encyclopaedia write that it "probably derived from a nearby Tavern, the Trumpeter Inn". It appears on Richard Horwood's original (1799) and revised (1813) map of London with Honey Lane Market at its western end where Russia Row is now.

== Buildings ==
A tavern known as Blossom's Inn once stood on the north side of the street on a large site on the corner with Lawrence Lane from the fourteenth century until 1855. In the 1750s it became the London base for James Pickford, founder of the Pickfords removal firm. Archaeological excavations on the site in 2001 recovered Roman remains. The site became a parcels depot for the Great Eastern Railway in the nineteenth century before being renamed Blossom's Inn again in the twentieth century.

The street was completely destroyed by German bombing on 29 December 1940 during the Second World War and has since been rebuilt.

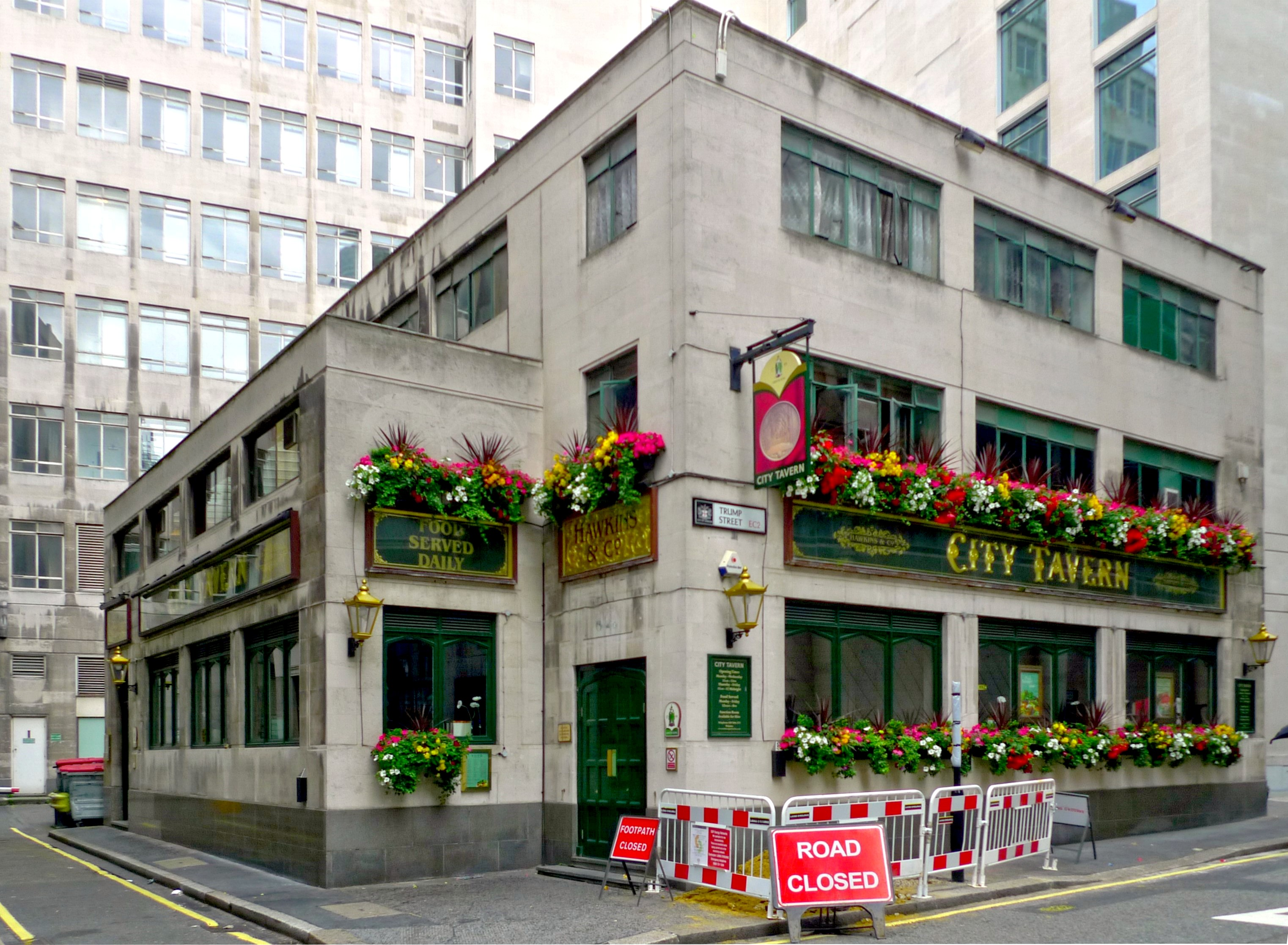
City Tavern, Trump Street, now demolished

Today it is completely made up of office buildings with some retail premises at street level. The City Tavern, a post-Second World War pub which once stood on the south side on the corner with Lawrence Lane has been replaced with offices. Opposite, still on the south side, is King's House (36–37 King Street). The north side, east of Lawrence Lane, is 35 King Street. The north side west of Lawrence Lane is an office building of 386,000 square feet (35,900 m^{2}) known as 30 Gresham Street that was developed by Land Securities in 2002–2003 and was described at the time as "the biggest speculative office development in the capital".

== Gallery ==
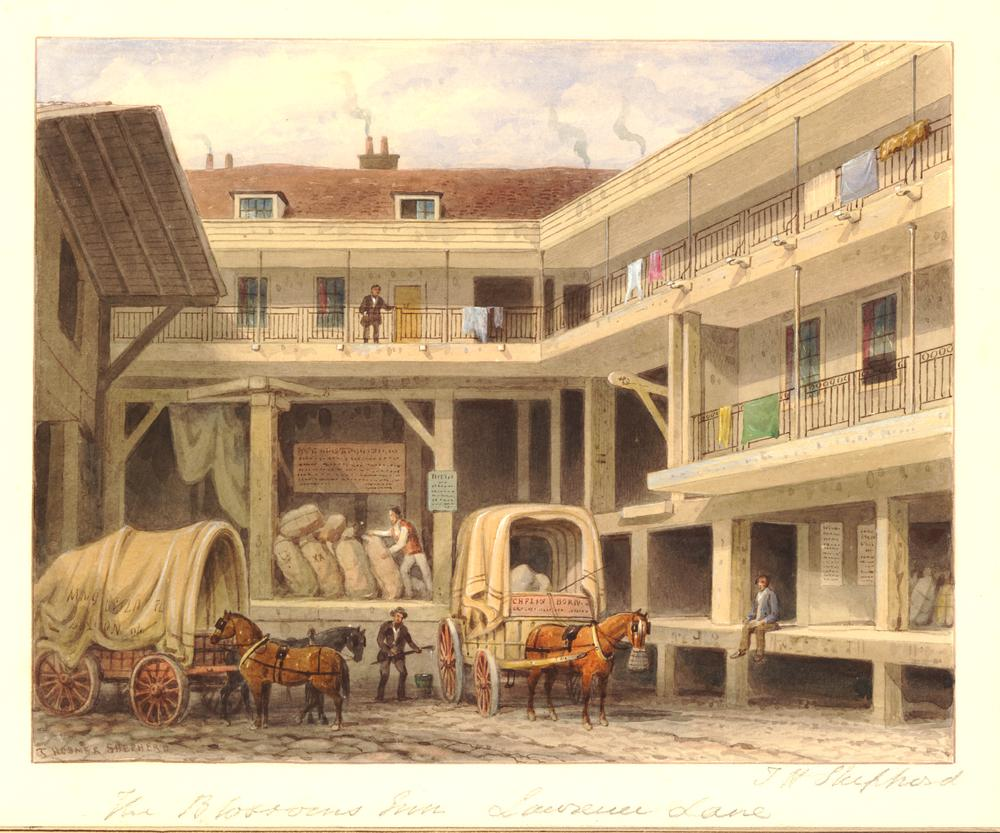
Blossom's Inn, Thomas H. Shepherd, 1850

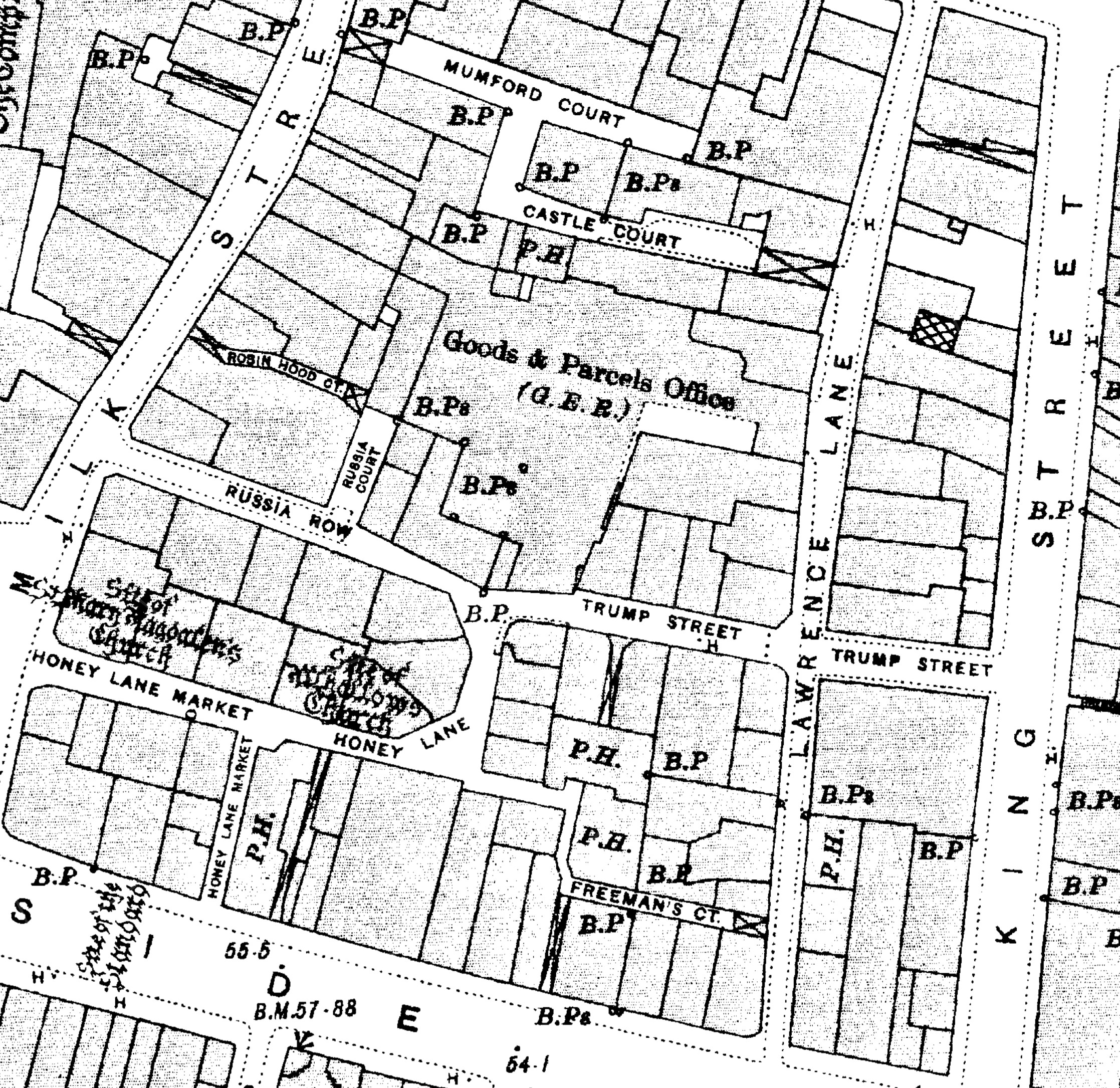
Trump Street on a 1916 Ordnance Survey map

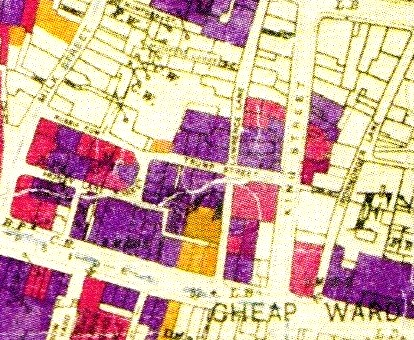
London Blitz bomb damage map, c. 1945. Purple = damaged beyond repair. Scarlet = seriously damaged, doubtful if repairable. Other colours = lower levels of damage.
