= Thomas Gerrard =

English Protestant reformer and martyr (1498–1540)

Thomas Gerard (1498–1540) (Gerrard, also Garret or Garrard) was an English Protestant reformer. In 1540, he was burnt to death for heresy, along with William Jerome and Robert Barnes.

== Life ==
He matriculated at Corpus Christi College, Oxford, on 9 August 1517, graduating B.A. in June 1518, and M.A. in March 1524. Some time during his residence at Oxford he moved to Christ Church (then called Cardinal College), and also went to Cambridge, where he took his B.D. and D.D.

Gerrard was one of the first English Protestants, distributing Lutheran books. In December 1525 Erasmus begs his commendations to him among other ‘booksellers.’ In 1526 he became curate to his friend Robert Forman, rector of All Hallows, Honey Lane; but John Foxe says that he was at Oxford at Easter 1527, and had been there since Christmas 1526, selling Latin books and William Tyndale's translation of the New Testament to the scholars. He had also distributed books at Cambridge.

Foxe says that he had intended to take a curacy in Dorset under a false name, but gave up the plan, and was at Reading some time in 1527, selling many of his books to the prior there. By Christmas, however, he was again hiding at Oxford, until in the middle of February 1528 he was seized by the commissary. He escaped by the help of a friend, but was again captured at Bedminster, near Bristol, on 29 February, and taken to the Somerset county gaol at Ilchester. After an examination on 9 March he was sent to London, examined before John Longland, Bishop of Lincoln and the Lord Privy Seal, and afterwards forced to recant before them and the bishops of London (Cuthbert Tunstall) and Bath and Wells. Longland complained (1 April) to Thomas Wolsey that Gerard was ‘a very subtyll, crafty, soleyn, and untrue man,’ as his answers differed from the scholars. Foxe gives a detailed account of this capture under a wrong date (1527).

Gerrard finally obtained a pardon from Wolsey, and was employed by him the same year in copying documents. By 1535 he had obtained the king's licence to preach. On 11 July he preached at Jervaulx Abbey, Yorkshire; a monk who interrupted him was taken into custody, and he was sent with letters from Sir Francis Bigod to Thomas Cromwell as a mark of favour. The subject and his fellow martyr, William Jerome, were both, at different times, chaplain to Bigod. Thomas Cranmer recommended him unsuccessfully to Cromwell for the living of St. Peter's, Calais. In June 1536 he was chaplain to the Bishop of Worcester, though in May his old enemy the Bishop of Lincoln had complained of his want of learning and discretion to Cromwell.

Through Cranmer's influence with Cromwell Gerrard was inducted on 14 June 1537 to All Hallows, Honey Lane. He also became chaplain to Cranmer, who sent him in August to preach at Calais. To please Cromwell, who had taken him into favour, Edmund Bonner appointed him to preach after Stephen Gardiner and Robert Barnes at St. Paul's Cross in Lent 1540. Gerrard, like Barnes, argued against Gardiner's sermon on passive obedience, and both of them, together with another Lent preacher, William Jerome, vicar of Stepney, were ordered to publicly recant from the pulpit of St. Mary Spital in Easter week.

The recantation was held to be ambiguous, and Gerrard, Barnes and Jerome were all three sent to the Tower of London and attainted as detestable heretics. Their names and Cromwell's were specially excepted from the king's general pardon of all offences committed before 1 July, and two days after Cromwell's execution they were drawn on a sledge through the middle of the city to Smithfield, and burnt at one stake (30 July 1540). Three Catholics were hanged on the same day. In the auto da fe′, Gerard renounced all heresy and begged forgiveness for faults of rashness and vehemence.
