= John Norman (draper) =

Fifteenth century Lord Mayor of London

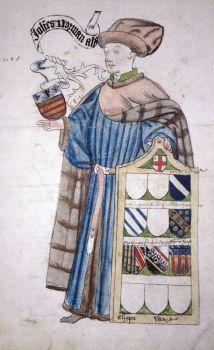
- Norman, dressed in his aldermanic robes.
- Died: 1468
- Title: Lord Mayor of London
- Father: John Norman

John Norman (died 1468) was a 15th-century draper, sheriff, alderman and for a term the Lord Mayor of London. He is known as being the first lord mayor to take a boat to Westminster to pledge his allegiance. Up until that point lord mayors of London had ridden or walked to Westminster in the yearly pageant on Lord Mayor's Day. Such river pageants existed until 1856, and today the lord mayor rides within a state coach during the pageant which is known today as Lord Mayor's Show. John Norman left his name to a song, supposedly created by the watermen who rowed him to Westminster, titled "Row the Boat, Norman".

== Draper, sheriff, alderman, mayor of London ==
John Norman was the son of John Norman of Banbury and was a draper by trade living at Sands End. In 1443 he was Sheriff of London and alderman of Castle Baynard Ward, removing to Cheap Ward in 1448. Also during 1448 he requested to be discharged from the office due to his advanced age and infirmity; and that if in the event he was nominated for the office of mayor that he should be avoided in preference another nominee. Even so, Norman twice represented the City of London in the parliaments of 1449 and was elected Lord Mayor of London in 1453.

Once mayors were elected they had fifteen days to take the oath at Guildhall. The day following taking the oath, the mayor would then ride to Westminster to be sworn before the Sovereign or the barons of the Exchequer. By the 15th century, during this yearly pageant the mayor would have been joined by members of the city's companies dressed in their liveries and accompanied by minstrels. (Today the parade is known as the Lord Mayor's Show). John Norman is considered to be the first lord mayor to go to Westminster by water. It is thought that his infirmity may have been the reason for the river procession instead of the customary parade. An historian of the Watermen's Company. H. Humpherus, in describing the river procession stated that Norman, "who having at his own expense built a noble barge, had it decorated with flags and streamers, in which he was this year rowed by watermen with silver oars, attended by such of the city companies as possessed barges, in a manner so splendid that 'his barge seemed to burn on the water'". The river procession seems to have been popular amongst the London commoners. Thus six years after Norman's river ride the commonality of London requested to have all further mayors go by barge to Westminster and all medieval mayors of London after Norman went by river to be sworn. The barges that were used in this fashion are the origin of the word "float" which is today used to describe decorated platforms or vehicles that are sometimes towed at parades, carnivals or festivals. River processions continued to be held for mayors until 1856.

Arms of John Norman as recorded in the Harley Collection.

According to the 15th century Sheriff of London Robert Fabyan, the watermen made John Norman a song of praise, which began: "Rowe the bote, Norman, Rowe to thy Lemman". A 19th-century music antiquary named Edward F. Rimbault thought that the melody to this song was the same as one published in John Hilton's compilation of rounds: Catch That, Catch Can (1658). The same melody has appeared in several other rounds (such as Turn Again, Whittington and Heave and Ho, Rumbelow) found in various collections. It is not certain which set of lyrics was the original, and whether the melody was written for Norman or Richard Whittington (who was lord mayor three times, first elected in 1397). It is thought likely that the melody would have been passed down as a folk song from previous generations. In such case according to Mary C. Taylor, it would have been only natural for a new set of lyrics to celebrate John Norman's inauguration, which was fifty-six years after Whittington's first.

Arms of John Norman as blazoned in Burke's The General Armory of England, Scotland, Ireland, and Wales.

During John Norman's tenure as mayor, he presided over all 165 meetings of the court of alderman, mayors court, and court of common council. In 1462, he was admitted to certain lands adjoining those of the Earl of Shrewsbury. Norman died in 1468 and gave his tenements to the Drapers Company on the north side of All Hallows Church, Honey Lane, where he was buried, on the condition that they pay 13s 4d yearly for lighting the lane. Later in 1473, the lands he had possessed at the time of his death were seized as no heir came to be admitted.

== Heraldry ==
John Norman's coat of arms appear illustrated in the portrait (pictured right) painted by Roger Leigh who lived around 1450. They (pictured above left) are recorded in British Library Harley MS 2169, folio 65; and are blazoned: Or, three bendlets gules, a chief per fess argent and ermine, charged in chief with three fleurs de lys sable. In the mid 19th century, Burke however gave a different blazon which omits the ermine: Or, three bars gules on a chief argent as many fleurs de lis sable.

== See also ==
- Lord Mayor's Day
- Lord Mayor's Show
- Lord Mayor of London
- List of Lord Mayors of London
- List of Sheriffs of London
- City of London (elections to the Parliament of England)
