= Lord Mayor's Day =

English holiday

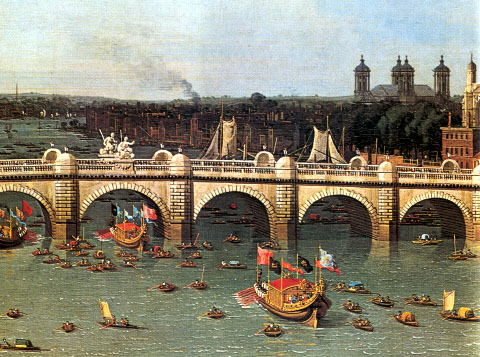
Lord Mayor's Day as depicted by Canaletto

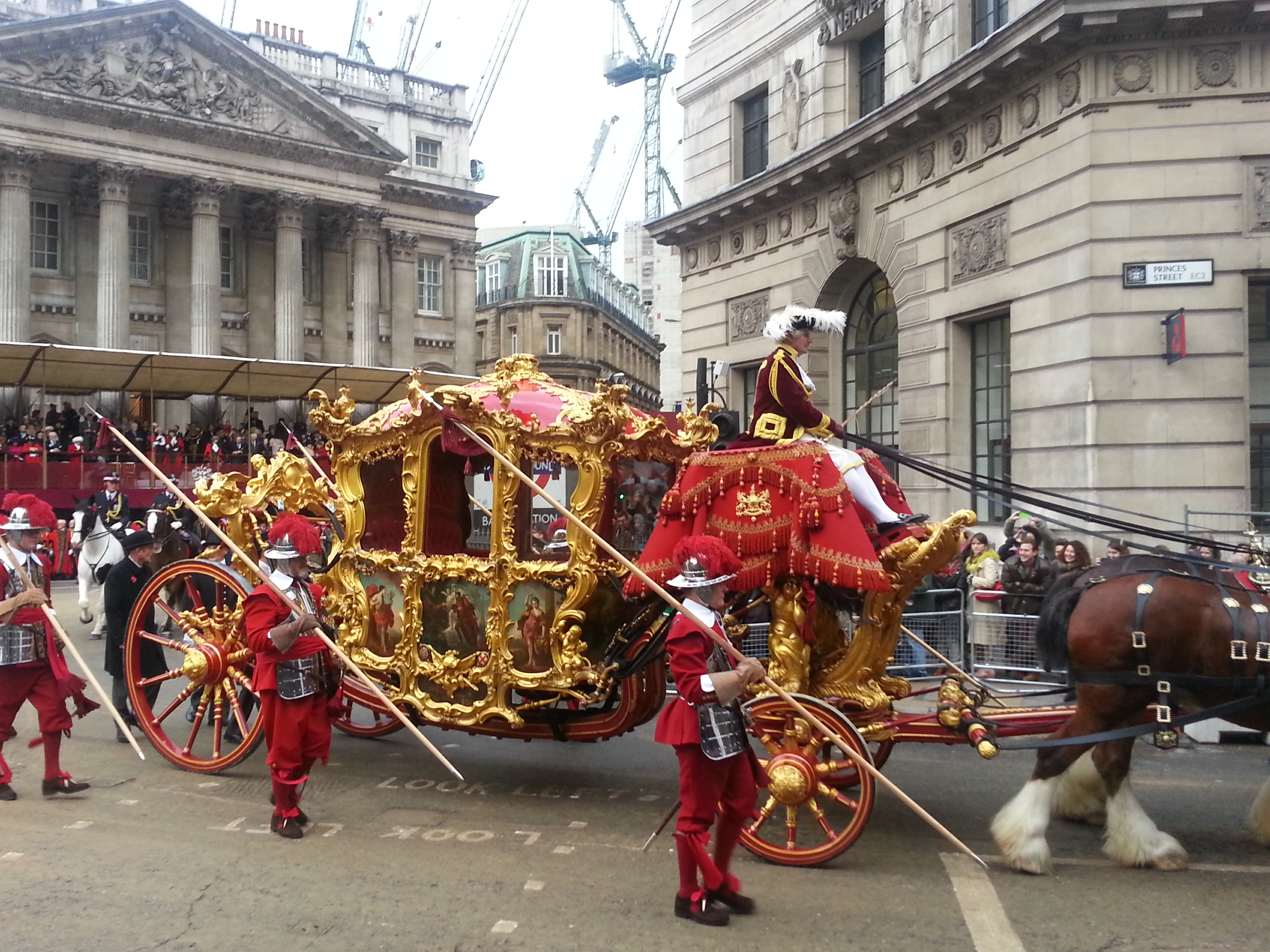
The Lord Mayor's Coach, on Lord Mayor's Day 2014

Lord Mayor's Day is the day marked by a pageant known as the Lord Mayor's Show for the Lord Mayor of the City of London, in England. It is formally styled as The Presentation of the Lord Mayor at The Royal Courts of Justice. When King John allowed the city to choose its Mayor it was with the caveat that the king should be informed as to who this was, with the new office holder being presented to the Lord Chief Justice and the other senior judges (originally the Barons of the Exchequer, now represented by the Queen's Remembrancer). From 1752 until 1959, it was held on 9 November. It is now held on the second Saturday in November.

== History ==
The first of these pageants was held in 1215. The idea originated in the stipulation made in a charter then granted by John that the citizen chosen to be mayor should be presented to the king or his justice for approval. The crowd of citizens who accompanied the mayor on horseback to Westminster developed into a yearly pageant, which each season became more elaborate.

Until the 14th century the mayor either rode or walked to Westminster, but in 1453 Sir John Norman appears to have set a fashion of going by water. From 1639 to 1655 the show disappeared owing to Puritan opposition. With the Restoration the city pageant was revived, but interregnums occurred during the years of the plague and fire, and in 1683 when a quarrel broke out between Charles and the city, ending in the temporary abrogation of the charter.

In 1711 an untoward accident befell the show, the mayor Sir Gilbert Heathcote (the original of Addison's Sir Andrew Freeport) being thrown by his horse. Sir Gilbert Heathcote broke his leg. The next year a coach was, in consequence, provided for the chief magistrate. In 1757 this was superseded by a gilded and elaborately decorated equipage costing £10,065 which was used until 1896, when a replica of it was built to replace it.
