= Milk Street, London =

Street in the City of London

Coordinates: 51.5150°N 0.0936°W

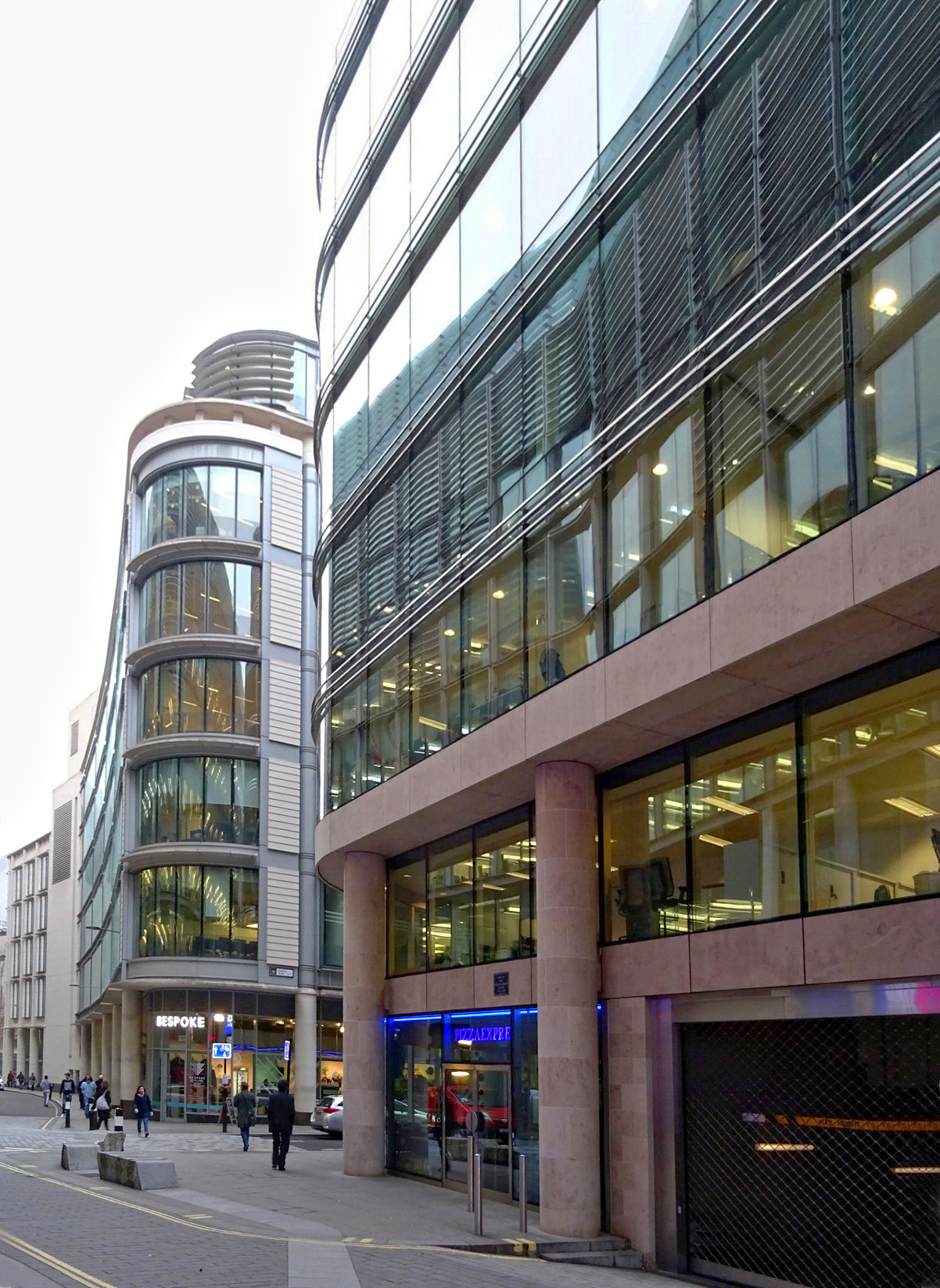
Milk Street south end with the former site of the City of London School on the right before the entrance to Russia Row

Milk Street in the City of London, England, was the site of London's medieval milk market. It was the location of the parish church of St Mary Magdalen which was destroyed in the Great Fire of London in 1666 and then of Honey Lane Market and the City of London School. The street was seriously damaged by German bombing during the Second World War and has since been completely rebuilt. Nothing remains of its former buildings.

== Location ==
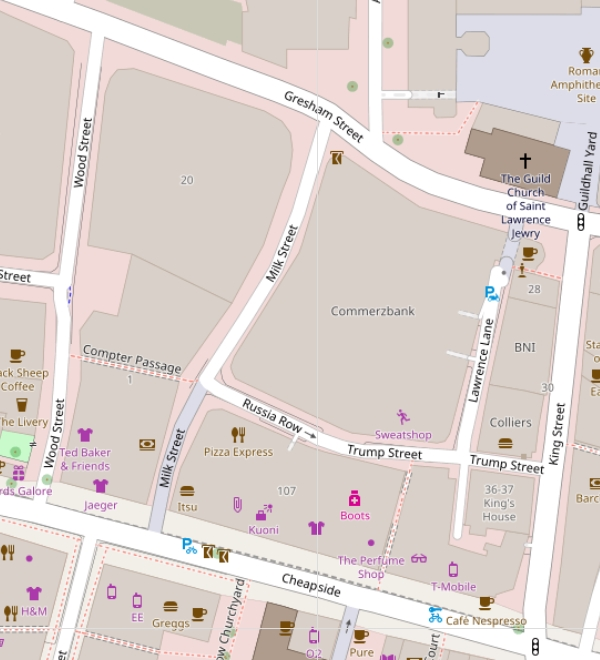
Map of the Milk Street area

The street runs between Gresham Street in the north and Cheapside in the south. The southern end beyond Russia Row is pedestrianised. On its western side it is joined to Wood Street by Compter Passage (pedestrianised). On its eastern side it is joined by Russia Row.

== Early history ==
Archaeological investigations of a site on the corner of the modern Milk Street and Russia Row by the Museum of London in 1976–77 found Roman remains. A medieval Jewish mikveh (ritual bath) was excavated here, and is now displayed in the Jewish Museum London.

Milk Street is first mentioned as "Melecstrate" in a source dating from c. 1132–1150. It was the site of medieval London's milk market and is also recorded as "Melchstrate" (1227), "Melkestrate" (1231), "Melkestret" (1253), "Melcstrate", "Melkstrete", "Milkstrate" (1278–79), "Milcstrate" (1279), and "Milkestretende". Sources record that there was a "great Fire in Milkstrete and Bread Street" in 1264.

Sir Thomas More, author of Utopia (1516), whose parents lived in Milk Street, was later said, without documentation, to have been born there in February 1478, and a plaque at the north end of the street marks the approximate spot. Sir Thomas Gresham was also in 1519, born in Milk Street. The south end of the street was the site of the parish church of St Mary Magdalen before the church was destroyed in the Great Fire of London in 1666. The parish was then merged with the adjacent St Lawrence Jewry and Honey Lane Market built on the site which at one time had 105 butchers' stalls. Edward Hatton noted in 1708 that the market was known for its meat, fish and poultry.

== Later history ==
By 1835 the market had closed and the City of London School was built on the market site on the corner with Russia Row. It was paid for with money bequeathed for the purpose by John Carpenter, city clerk in the reign of King Henry V. It outgrew this site and in 1883 the school moved to the Victoria Embankment.

The street was seriously damaged by German bombing on 29 December 1940 at its southern end and at the north end on the western side. It has since been completely rebuilt with offices and some retail premises at ground level. The east side between Gresham Street and Russia Row is an office building of 386,000 square feet (35,900 m^{2}) known as 30 Gresham Street that was developed by Land Securities in 2002–03. It was described at the time as "the biggest speculative office development in the capital".

As a result of Second World War bombing and post-war redevelopment, nothing remains of Milk Street's original buildings or of the small courts and alleys that once joined it on both sides: Mitre Court and Feathers Court on its western side, and Mumford Court and Honey Lane Market on the eastern side. Robin Hood Alley, which has also been called Robinson's Court, Robin Hood Court and Robin Court, once joined it to Russia Row but that alley also no longer exists.

== Gallery ==
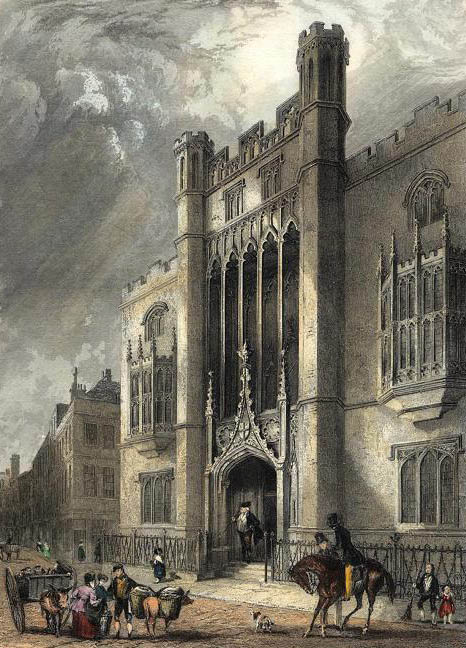
City of London School, Milk Street. Hand-coloured engraving by J. Woods and Hablot Knight Browne after a sketch by Robert Garland. Published 1838.

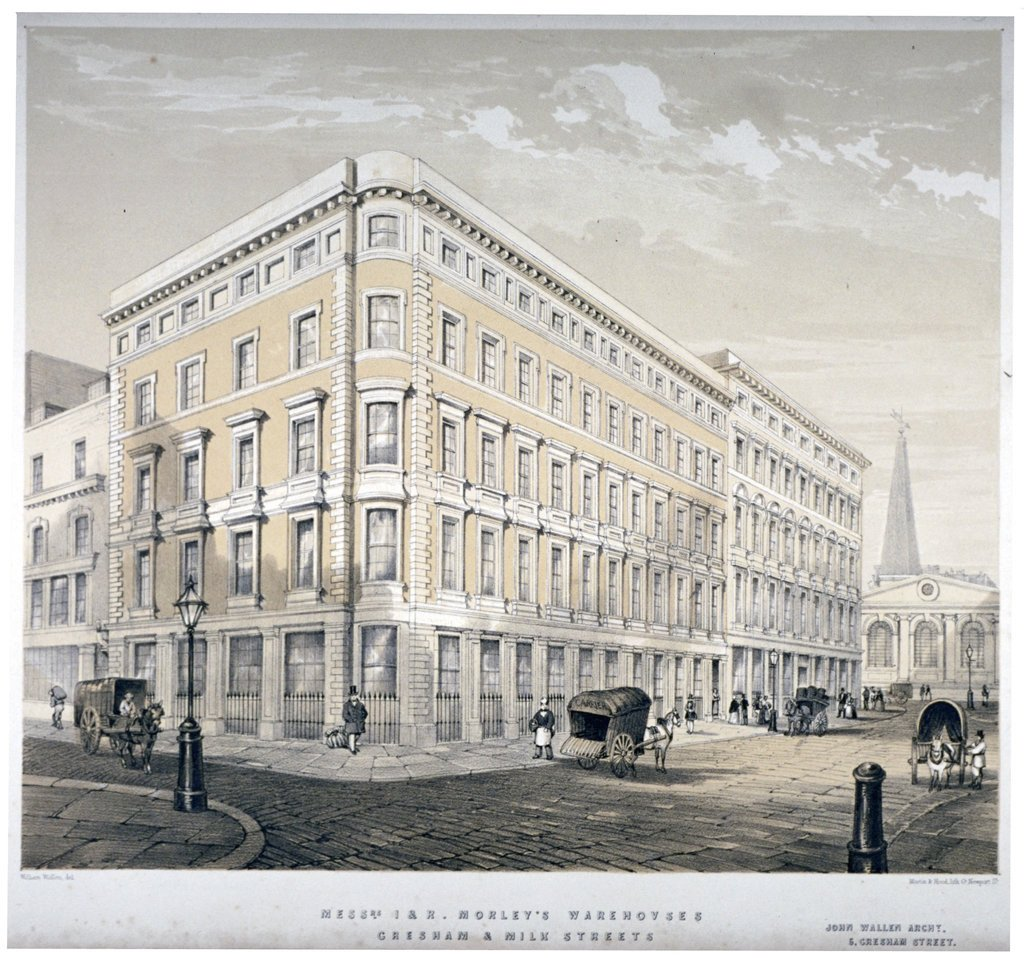
I & R Morley's warehouses, corner of Milk Street and Gresham Street, c. 1840. Lithograph by Martin & Hood after an original by William Wallen.

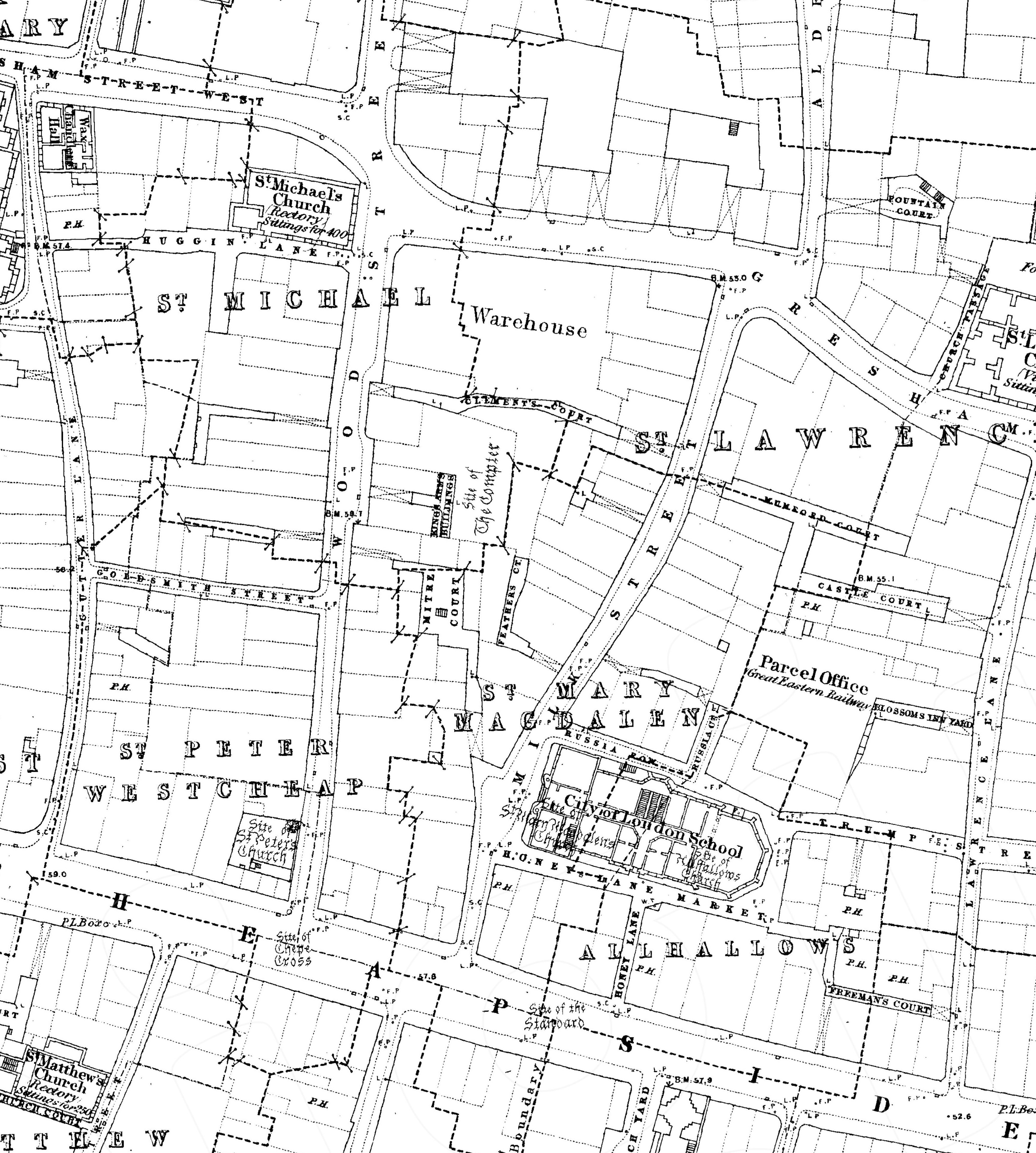
Milk Street (centre, vertical) on an 1875 Ordnance Survey map.

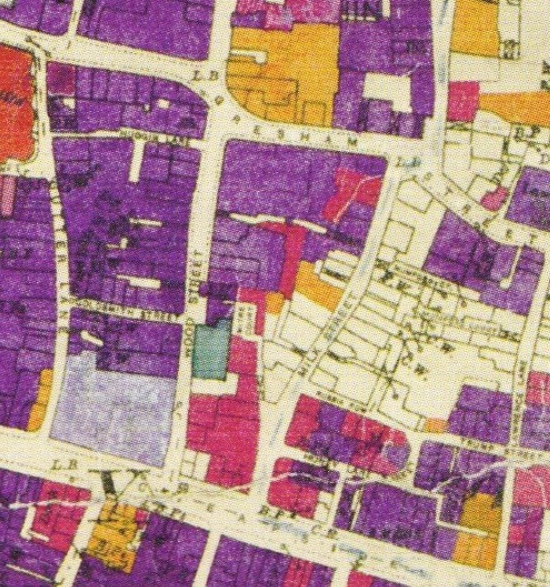
London Blitz bomb damage map, c. 1945 (purple: damaged beyond repair; scarlet: seriously damaged, doubtful if repairable; other colours: lower levels of damage)
