= Thomas Forman (reformer) =

English reformist

Thomas Forman (also referred to as Robert Forman and sometimes spelled Farman; c. 1493–1528), was an early English reformer who served as the rector of All Hallows, Honey Lane and also as President of Queens' College, Cambridge. He is chiefly remembered for distributing heretical books before the English Reformation with his curate Thomas Gerrard.

== Life ==
Forman received his B.A. degree in 1511 and in 1514 he was elected as a Fellow of Queens' College, Cambridge. He took his Doctorate in Divinity in 1524 and in 1525 he was elected as President of the college and also became the rector of one of the wealthiest parishes in London, All Hallows Honey Lane.

Forman was staunch adherent of the Reformation and distributed the books of Luther and Tyndale from London booksellers to the universities of Oxford and Cambridge and elsewhere when they were proscribed in England. In February 1526 he is thought to have tipped of the White Horse Group prior to a raid by Sir Thomas More.

In 1528, Forman was arrested in London and his curate, Thomas Gerrard, was picked up in Oxford as part of a two-pronged investigation to the illicit book trade. He was interrogated by Cuthbert Tunstall, the bishop of London, and denied sending the books to Oxford but freely admitted having them in his possession. Tunstall was not convinced and advised Cardinal Wolsey to take sureties for good behavior. An intervention by Anne Boleyn, who wrote to Wolsey, allowed Forman and Garred to be released.

Forman died in October 1528.

Academic offices
Preceded by John Jenyn	President of Queens' College, Cambridge; 1525–1527	Succeeded by William Frankleyn
