= The London Pageant of 1621 =

1621 celebration of Edward Barkham's inauguration as Lord Mayor of London

The London Pageant of 1621 including Thomas Middleton's The Sun in Aries followed the inauguration of Edward Barkham as Lord Mayor of London on 29 October 1621.

Edward Barkham was sworn into the office of Lord Mayor on 29 October 1621 at the Guildhall, as part of the traditional annual Lord Mayor's Show held on that date. The performance was sponsored by the London Company of Drapers. Middleton's play was published in 1621 by Edward Allde. It celebrates the mercantile values professed by the City of London. The scenery was built by the carpenter Master Garret Christmas.

Barkham returned from Westminster by boat to St Paul's Churchyard, where there was a pageant chariot illustrating the theme of Honour. Examplars included Jason and the golden fleece (appropriate for the drapers), Hercules with the silver pilasters, all-conquering Alexander and the globe, and Julius Caesar with his gilt laurel circlet. Jason gave a speech declaring, "The barke is under sayle".

The next tableau was the triumph of the Tower of Virtue, kept secure by Integrity. The tower was garrisoned by six knights in shining gold and silver armour, who were the champions of former luminaries of the Draper's Company and City. Fame herself made a salutation, explaining the "six warders" in armour were Clear Conscience, Providence, Watchfulness, Constancy, Zeal, and Care. The motto was Fortunae Mater Diligence or, diligence is the mother of good fortune.

An actor in dishevelled clothing leaning against the Tower of Virtue threw off his robe (presumably revealing more seemly attire) and declared that King James and the five Tudors had restored his ruin.

The shepherd Phoebus Apollo as the sun sat surrounded by signs of the zodiac on an artificial mountain built near St Lawrence's lane with grazing woolly sheep. Aries explained how the sun would shine on Barkham and make gladness run. Barkham was followed home by Hope with a silver anchor, Harmony with a swan, and a "whole army" of similar figures with lighted tapers. Fame's speech concluded the event.

A reconstruction of the event was organised for the 400 year anniversary in October 2021.
