= I. & R. Morley =

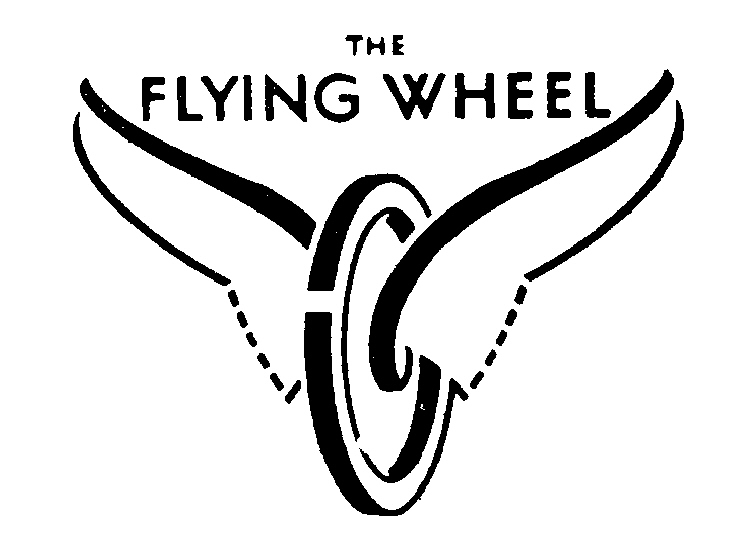
I & R Morley "Flying Wheel" trademark from 1926

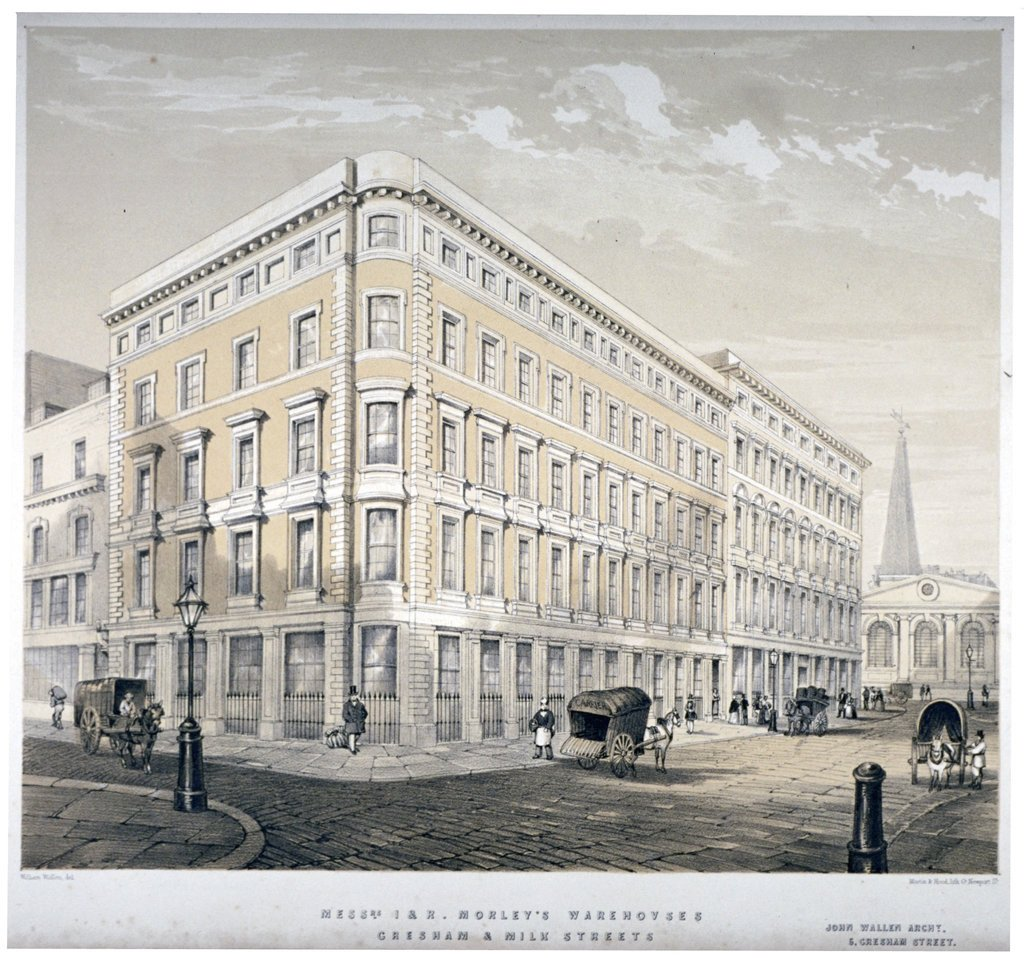
Morley's warehouses, corner of Milk Street and Gresham Street, London, c. 1840.

I & R Morley were a firm of hosiery manufacturers of Nottingham, England. The company takes its name from John and Richard Morley. These brothers were born in the old Manor House next to St Stephen's Church, Sneinton. Their father was a small farmer and a hosiery manufacturer, a common combination in a Nottinghamshire village of those days. In 1797 it was decided that the older brother, John, should go to London to open a small warehouse for the sale of the goods, which had been manufactured under the direction of Richard, by home workers in Nottingham and its villages. The Nottingham warehouse was firstly in Greyhound Street, and later occupied the whole Eastern side of Fletcher Gate. The company's reputation for quality won many customers and eventually it became a supplier to the British royal family.

In 1968, I & R Morley was taken over by Courtaulds and the Morley name disappeared after 170 years in the hosiery business.

== See also ==
- Samuel Morley (MP)
- Samuel Morley, 1st Baron Hollenden
