= All Hallows Honey Lane =

Coordinates: 51.5145°N 0.0935°W

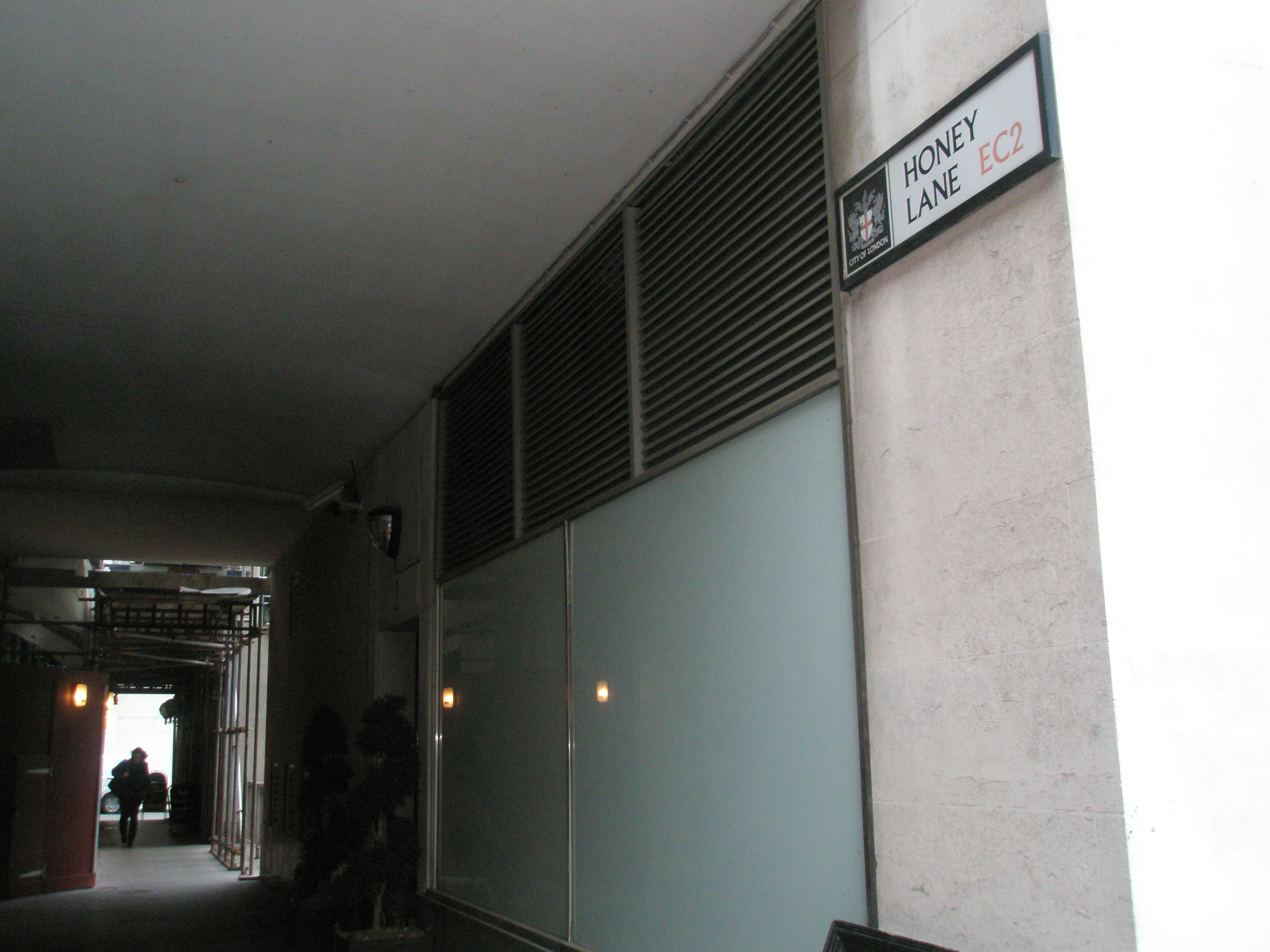
- The current Honey Lane, located about 140 feet (43 m) east of the original lane
- All Hallows Honey Lane
- Location: City of London
- Country: England
- Denomination: Anglican

Architecture
- Completed: c. 12th century
- Demolished: 1666

All Hallows, Honey Lane was a parish church in the City of London, England. Of medieval origin, it was destroyed in the Great Fire of London in 1666 and not rebuilt; the site became part of Honey Lane Market, which was in turn partially cleared to make way for the City of London School in the 19th century. Much of the area was destroyed during the bombing in World War II and has been redeveloped. The name Honey Lane is retained in a nearby walkway.

== Location ==
All Hallows Honey Lane was located at the north end of Honey Lane, a narrow lane leading north from Cheapside. The church was surrounded on three sides by churchyard and enclosed by private houses. It was situated about 200 feet (61 m) north of Cheapside. John Stow's Survey of 1603 indicates the parish was part of Cheap Ward of the City of London.

After the Great Fire, the site, together with that of the adjoining church of St. Mary Magdalen Milk Street and several houses, was acquired by the City, cleared, and laid out as a market-place, called Honey Lane Market. The former church was situated in the northwest corner of this market.

Part of the market closed in 1835 and the Corporation of London built the first City of London School there. After the bombings of World War II, the area was comprehensively redeveloped. The alignment of the present Honey Lane is about 140 feet (43 m) east of the original lane. The church site is now occupied by a British Telecom shop at 114 Cheapside.

== History ==
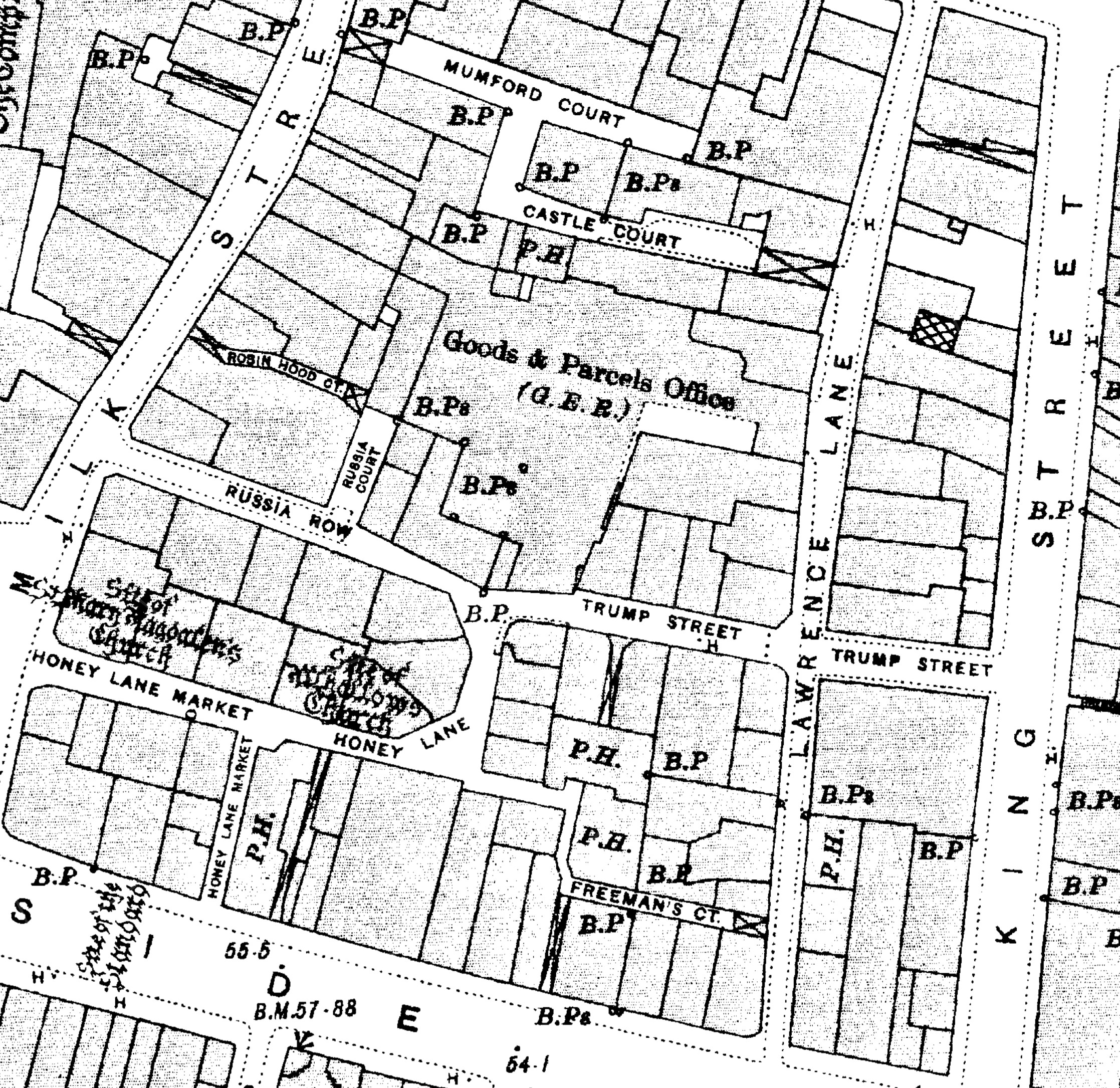
Honey Lane--Ordnance Survey map of 1916, also showing the pre-1666 London Fire, All Hallows church location.

The church may have originated as a private chapel associated with a nearby property, though no specific property has been identified. The earliest historical reference to the church, dating from between 1191 and 1212, comes in a deed which mentions one "Helias presbyter de Hunilane". Early mentions of the church describe it as "parochia Omnium Sanctorum de Hunilane" (1204–1215); "St. Elfegi de Hunilane" (1216–22, the only occurrence of an apparent alternative dedication), "All Hallows de Honilane" (1279); "All Hallows in Honylane" (1287) and "Parish of Honylane" (1297).

=== Parish ===
The parish of All Hallows was very small, and may originally have comprised only the area of those properties which surrounded Honey Lane and the churchyard and then been subsequently enlarged in the early 13th century. Even after this enlargement, the parish, covering only about 1 acre (0.4 hectare) in area, was one of the smallest in the City. There was a suggestion in 1658 that it should be united with that of St. Mary le Bow, but the idea was dropped and the two remained separate until after the Great Fire.

In the late 12th and early 13th century, the parish became one of the first centres in the City for the trade of mercery: trading in cloth, typically silk and other fine cloth that was not produced locally. The parish had several small shops and selds, or covered markets, specializing in the trade.

=== Patronage ===
The earliest known patron of the church was Henry de Wokyndon, in the mid-13th century. The advowson then passed to various private owners until 1446, when it was willed to the Grocers' Company. The Grocers' Company retained the advowson until the Great Fire. The Grocers' Company had a custom of appointing learned men as rector of the church, at least until 1540. In the mid-16th century, the Company appointed graduates from the Universities of Oxford and Cambridge, apparently in strict alternation.

=== Lutheranism ===
At the time of the Protestant Reformation, the church was known for its Lutheran sympathies. Dr. Robert Forman, rector from 1525 to his death in 1528 and president of Queens' College, Cambridge, over the same period, was a well-known early reformer famous for his sermons and his interest in Lutheran books and doctrines. His curate at All Hallows, Thomas Gerrard (or Garret), himself appointed rector in 1537, was even more active in spreading Lutheran doctrines. In 1540 he was found guilty of heresy and burnt at the stake in Smithfield with other Protestants. In 1543, other members of the parish were also examined for holding allegedly "heretical" doctrines.

=== Destruction ===
All Hallows was destroyed by the Great Fire of London in 1666 and not rebuilt. Instead its parish was united with that of St. Mary le Bow; the name lived on as a ward precinct.

== Architecture ==
No archaeological traces of the church remain in situ. After the church's destruction in the Great Fire, the site was cleared for the market. When the City of London School was built there in 1835, the site was excavated to a depth of over 15 ft. (4.57 m.) before concrete foundations were laid. Tiles, the pavement, and vaults of a church described as "Anglo-Norman"” were found at that time. A rough pencil sketch made at about the same time, and entitled "part of old church discovered in Honey Lane", shows the remains of masonry walls including three pointed arches over what appear to be blocked openings. Two "Norman" capitals and the capital of a "Saxon" column, decorated with twisted serpents, were also found. One of the serpent capitals - now considered to be 12th century - is in the British Museum. These remains could, however have belonged to either of churches on the site of the school, or possibly to one of the houses nearby.

It is not known whether there had been any medieval rebuilding or enlargement of the church. However, because the structure described in the 1550s was apparently very simple, it is possible that this was the original church, altered little if at all. In the mid-16th century the church appears to have been a simple rectangular building, about 60 feet (18 m) long and 23 feet (7.0 m) wide. The cellar beneath the church was owned separately, from at least the early 14th century until the early 17th century. There was door on the south side of the church near the west end (opposite Honey Lane) and a chancel door, also on the south side.

The church was surrounded to north, west, and south by its churchyard. In addition, excavations in 1954-5 on the site of the former No. 111 Cheapside uncovered a number of medieval burials. They probably represent an area of early churchyard subsequently encroached upon by private building. It is not clear whether this early churchyard would have extended as far south as Cheapside. In addition to those in the churchyard, there were some burials within the church. A vault near the chancel is also mentioned. Despite the narrowness of the church, part of it was referred to as the "south aisle", and several burials took place there in the 16th century. This may be the same area called the "burial aisle" in the register. In 1611 the parish bought the cellar, as a "more convenient place of burial for any of the inhabitants". The first burial took place in the cellar (referred to as the "cloister" in the burial register) in 1613.

A chapel of St. Mary within the church is mentioned in a will of 1380. In 1545, apart from the high altar in the church there were altars to Our Lady (possibly in the chapel mentioned) and to St. Thomas the Martyr. By the 1550s there was a gallery, reached by stairs, and the church had several pews and a font. Churchwardens' accounts, beginning in 1618, indicate there were two or more bells, hung probably in a belfry with a steeple.

== Monuments and burials ==
In his Survey of 1603, John Stow notes only of All Hallows that "there be no monumentes in this church worth the noting. I find that John Norman, Draper, Mayor 1453, was buried there."
