= Lockie's Topography of London =

Lockie's Topography of London gives a concise local description of and accurate direction to every square, street, lane, court, dock, wharf, public office, the metropolis, and its environs, including the new buildings to the present time, upon a plan never hitherto attempted. Written by John Lockie was an important gazetteer of London and published in 1810.

The book was prepared by Lockie from his survey designed for the insurer's Phoenix Fire-Office of Lombard Street, for whom he was the Inspector of Buildings. It was printed by S. Couchman of Throgmorton Street and sold by a variety of booksellers in London, who are listed on the title page. In the Preface, Lockie commented that it had taken him seven years of “assiduity and patient labor” to prepare the contents. Therefore, he hoped that it would receive the patronage of the public. Lockie went on to add that “the whole Work having been accomplished by his own personal Exertions, he is enabled to offer the fullest Assurances of the Accuracy of its Execution.”

The book was reprinted in facsimile form by the London Topographical Society in 1994.

== See also ==
- Edward Hatton (surveyor)
