= Blossom's Inn =

Staging post

Coordinates: 51.5145°N 0.0928°W

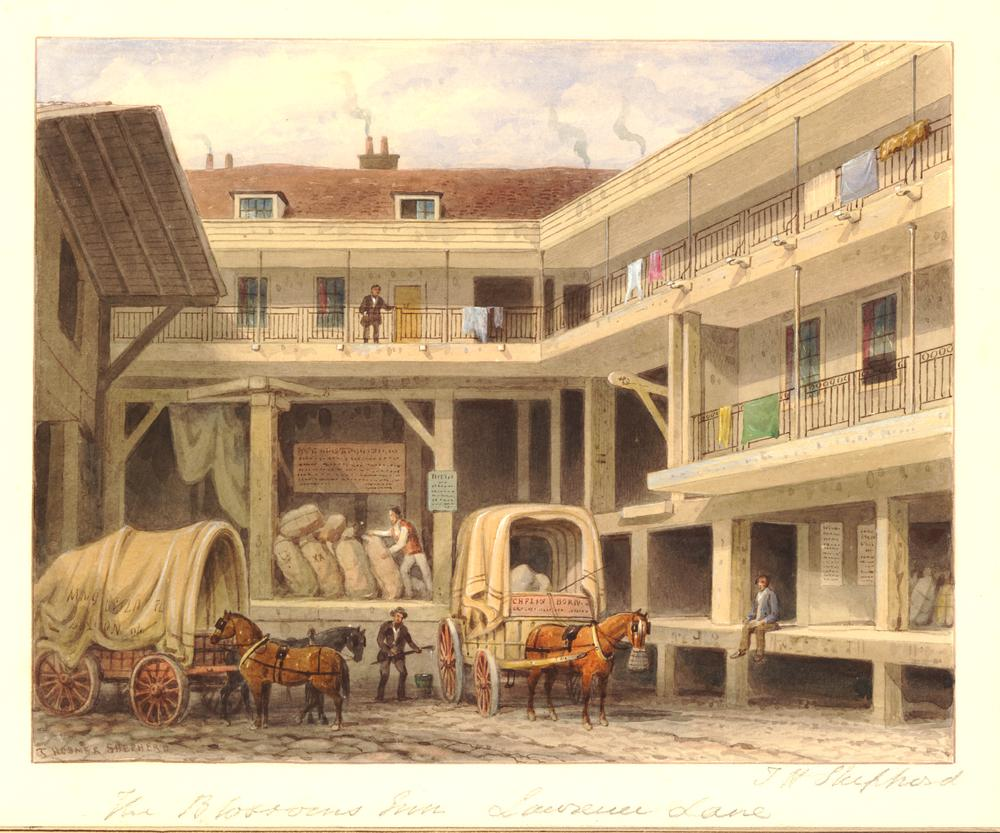
Blossom's Inn by Thomas H. Shepherd, 1850

Blossom's Inn was a tavern which stood in Lawrence Lane in the City of London from the 14th century until 1855. It became a substantial coaching inn and was used as a staging post by carriers of goods. In the 19th century, the lease was bought and it became the parcel depot of the Great Eastern Railway. Its name was used for a major property development at the end of the 20th century and the site is now part of the large complex of 30 Gresham Street.

== Signage ==
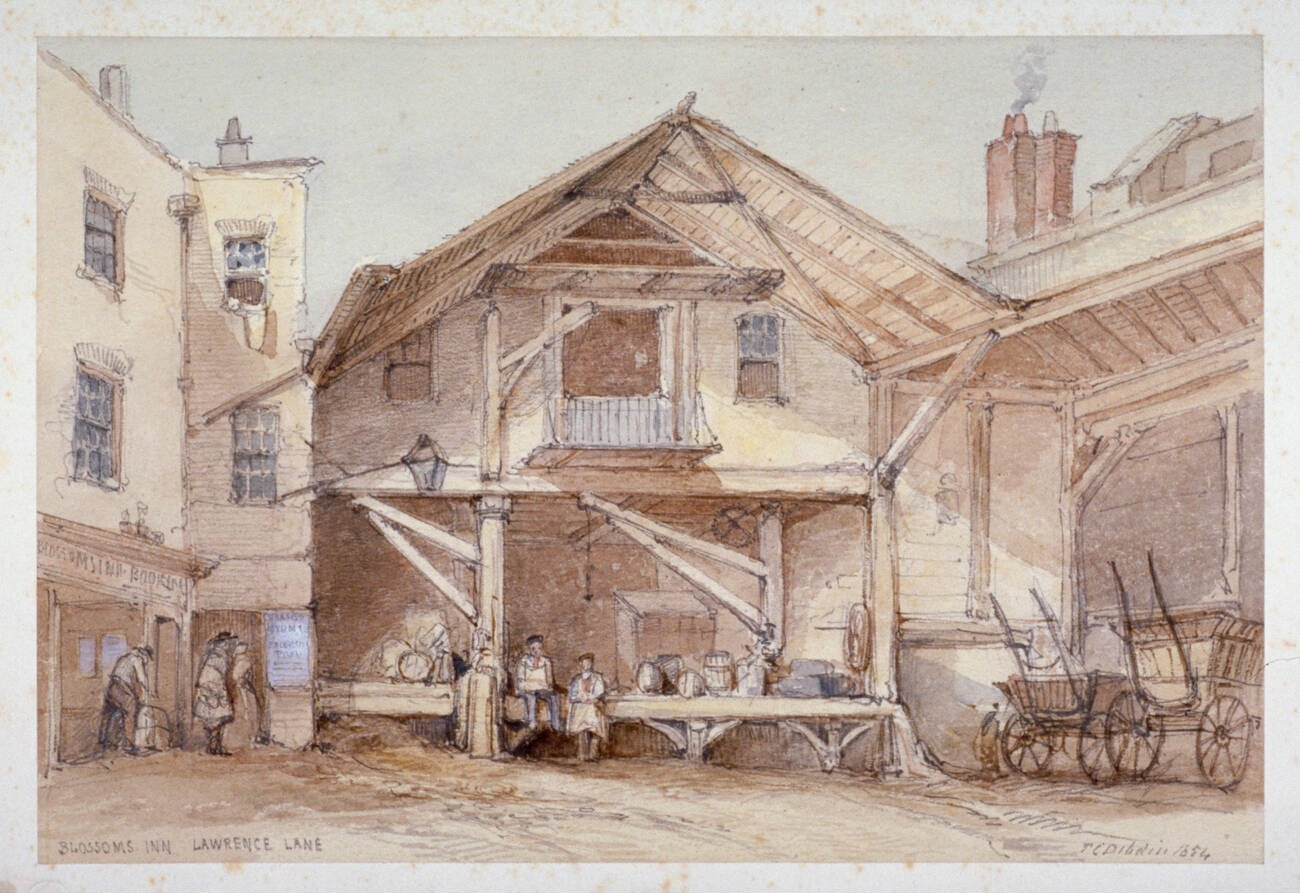
Blossom's Inn by Thomas Colman Dibdin, 1854

It was named after its inn sign which showed Saint Lawrence and was bordered with the hawthorn blossoms, which were a traditional adornment for such signs. The name was spelt in various other ways such as Bosom's Inn. These names were either a corruption of "blossom" or, perhaps, a fanciful alternative meaning as Deloney's Thomas of Reading says "Our jolly clothiers kept up their courage and went to Bosom's Inn, so called from a greasy old fellow who always went nudging with his head in his bosom..." Ben Jonson used this spelling in Christmas, His Masque with the lines, "But now comes Tom of Bosom's Inn, and he presenteth Misrule".

== Carriers ==
When the Holy Roman Emperor, Charles V, visited Henry VIII in 1522, the inn was recorded as having twenty beds and stabling for sixty horses. The inn became a staging post for carriers in the sixteenth century and was, until 1756, the London departure point for James Pickford, of the Pickfords family business. Thomas Nashe's Have with You to Saffron-Walden alludes to this, saying "Yet have I naturally cherisht and hugt it in my bosome, even as a carrier at Bosome's Inn doth a cheese under his arms".

In 1835, an aged porter at the inn, John Neat, had hanged himself for the third time. He was taken to Barts where he seemed to be quite dead. His treatment included a blister, brandy, a draught of ammonia with camphor, friction over the heart, heating of the feet, letting of four pounds of blood and a turpentine enema. After a day of this, he was said to be "much better" but "still somewhat maniacal".

== Later history ==
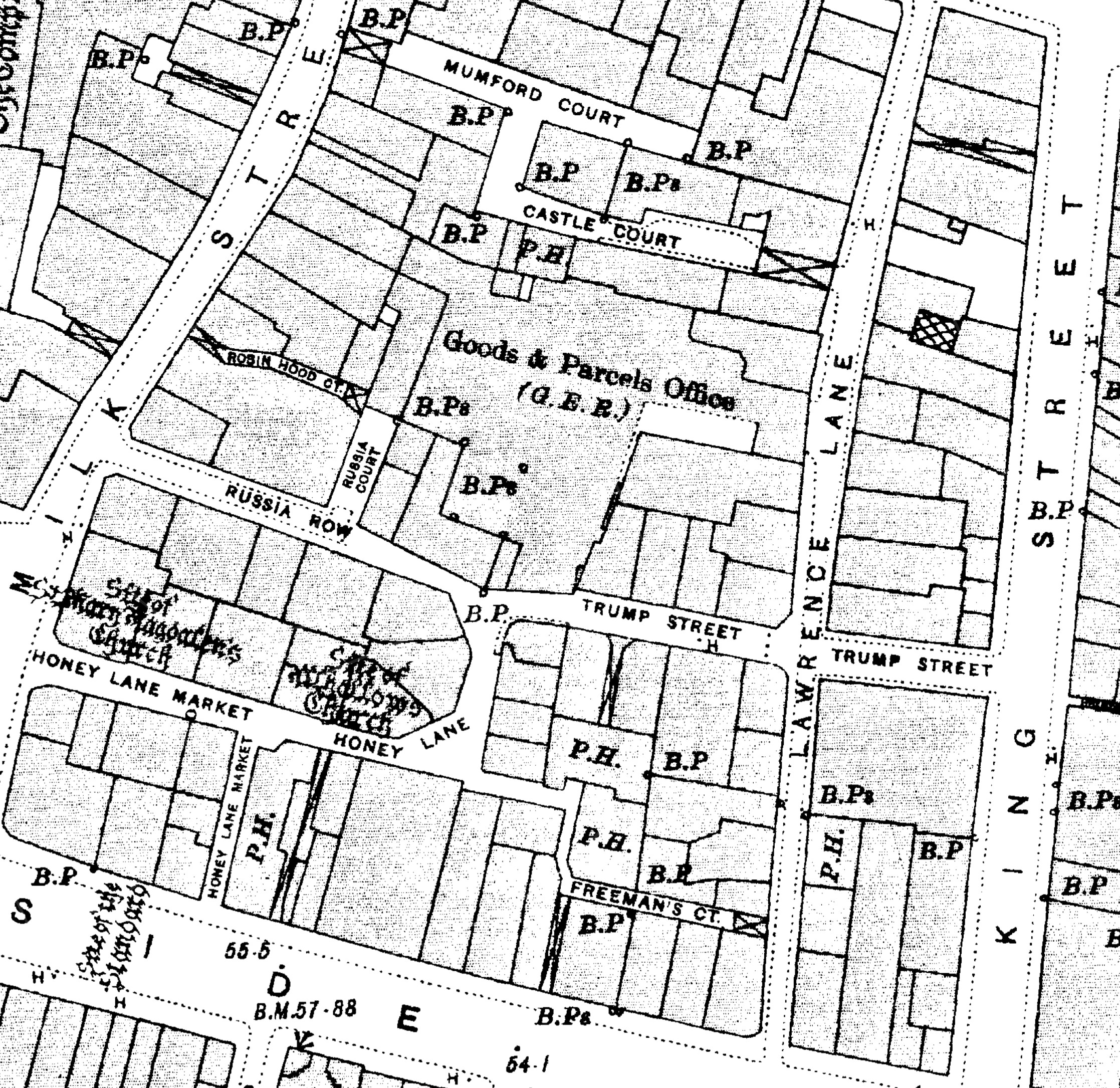
The site of Blossom's Inn (centre) shown as the Goods & Parcels Office of the Great Eastern Railway on a 1916 Ordnance Survey map

The site became a parcels depot for the Great Eastern Railway in the nineteenth century before being renamed Blossom's Inn again in the twentieth century. Today, the site of Blossom's Inn is entirely covered by an office building of 386,000 square feet (35,900 m^{2}) known as 30 Gresham Street that was developed by Land Securities in 2002–03 and was described at the time as "the biggest speculative office development in the capital".

== See also ==
- Swan with Two Necks
