= Lawrence Lane, London =

Street in the City of London

Coordinates: 51.5146°N 0.0926°W

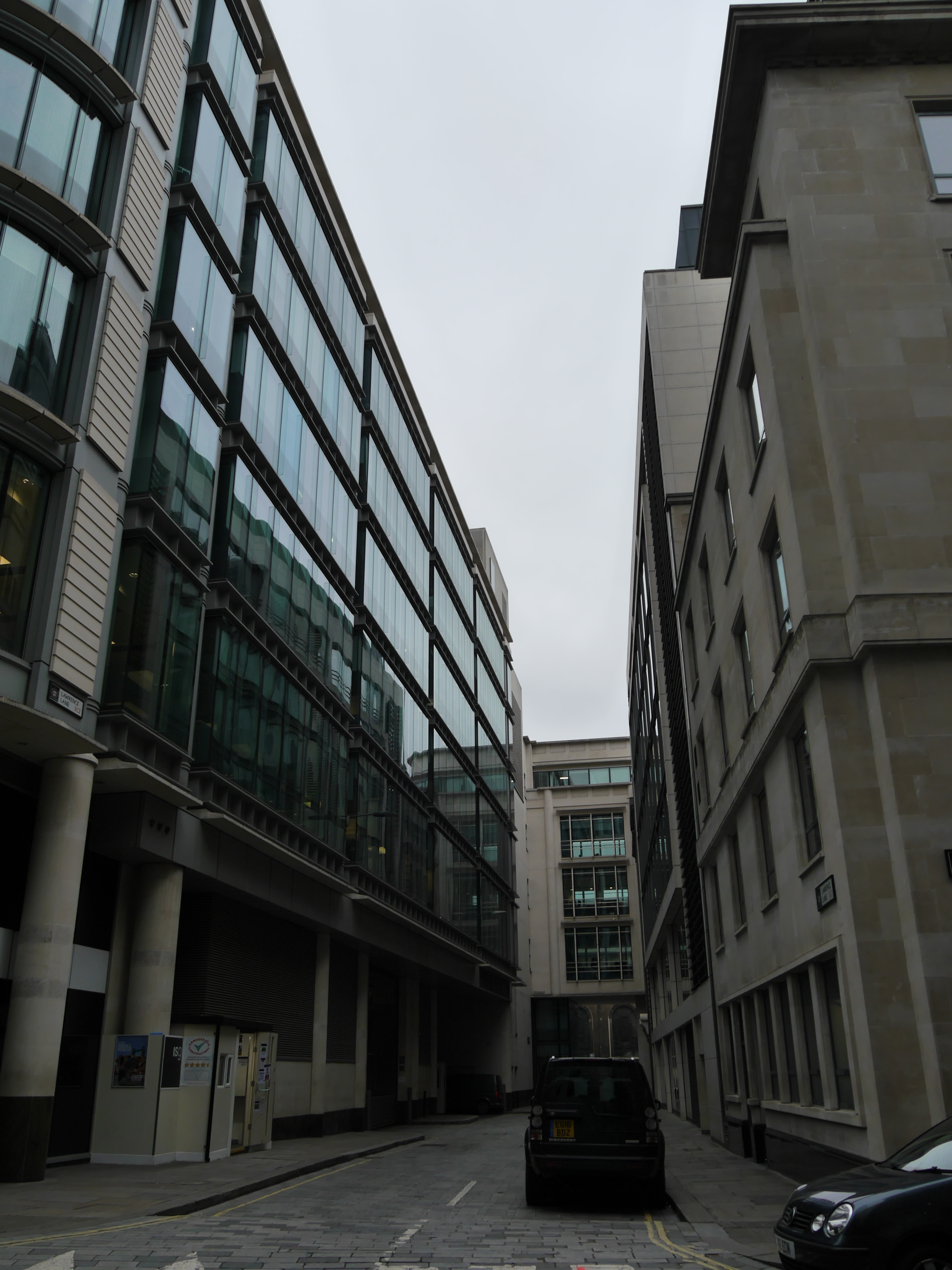
Lawrence Lane

Lawrence Lane is a street in the City of London that runs from Trump Street in the south to Gresham Street in the north. Its final section in the north is pedestrianised. An alley also joins it to King Street in the north. It once ran south to join Cheapside but that end was blocked following post-Second World War rebuilding. It was known as St Lawrence Lane from the 13th to the 18th centuries due to its proximity to the church of St Lawrence Jewry and until King Street was built was the main route from Cheapside to the London Guildhall.

During the London Pageant of 1621 an artificial mountain was built on the lane as the seat of Phoebus Apollo and the zodiac, to celebrate the inauguration of Edward Barkham as Lord Mayor of London.

A tavern known as Blossom's Inn once stood on the western side of the street on a large site on the corner with Trump Street from the fourteenth century until 1855. In the 1750s it became the London base for James Pickford, founder of the Pickfords removal firm. Archaeological excavations on the site in 2001 recovered Roman remains. The site became a parcels depot for the Great Eastern Railway in the nineteenth century before being renamed Blossom's Inn again in the twentieth century.
