= Edward Hatton (surveyor) =

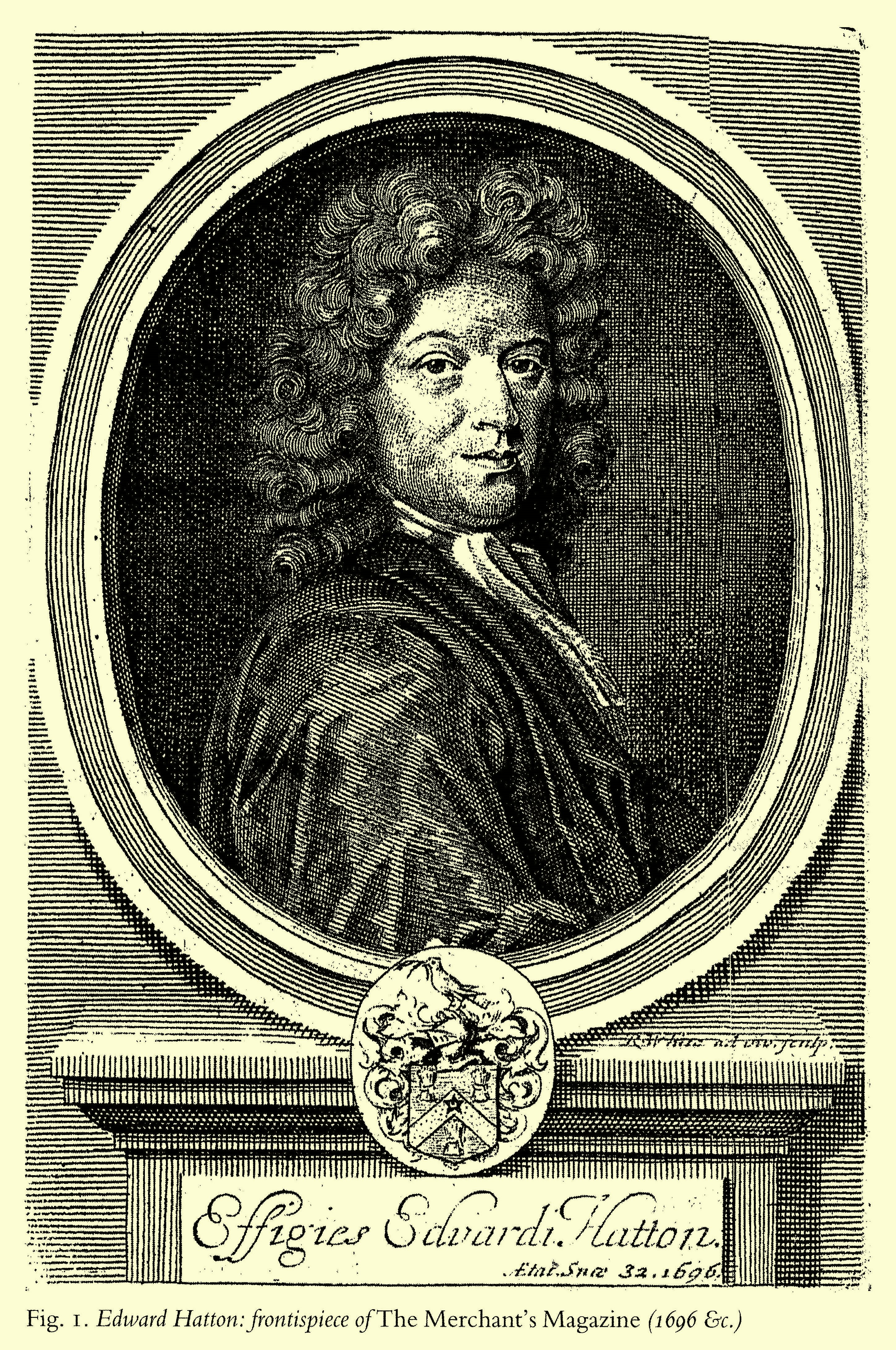
Edward Hatton

Edward Hatton (c. 1664 – after 1733) was a surveyor for a fire insurance company in London who wrote A New View of London: or, an Ample Account of that City, in Two Volumes, or Eight Sections. &c., published anonymously in two octavo volumes 1708. The New View is an important reference to the streets, life and buildings of London not long after the Great Fire of London, 1666.

== A New View of London ==
The New View was apparently prepared mainly in the 1680s and 90s and by the time it was published in 1708 a supplement was necessary to bring it up to date. It contained one map and a small number of illustrations.

In the preface, Hatton acknowledged the debt that his work owed to John Stow's A Survey of London (1598), saying "If it be objected, that I have taken several things from Mr. Stow, I own the truth thereof" but stating the necessity for his new work on the grounds that the "devouring flames" of the Great Fire had "made such vast Alterations, that what was London in Mr. Stow's time, is now like another City."

The New View commences with an introduction to the government of London, past and present, followed by eight sections, each arranged alphabetically:

- I. A 92-page street directory.
- II. A history of over 100 churches and chapels in nearly 500 pages.
- III. Descriptions of the livery companies of London, customs houses, the Bank of England etc.
- IV. Palaces and houses of the nobility. The Houses of Parliament and notable Halls.
- V. Colleges, libraries, museums, free schools and courts etc.
- VI. Hospitals, prisons, workhouses, houses of correction, almshouses, charity schools.
- VII. Fountains, bridges, conduits, ferries, docks, keys, wharfs.
- VIII. Public statues.

Hatton states that the inspiration for his own work was a pocket guide to Paris. This may have been the Description de Paris, by Germain Brice, first published 1681, which received an English translation in 1685.

The New View went far beyond a simple street directory, as may be seen from the contents list, and it included details such as the colour of lawyers robes, the weekly rations of children in the workhouse and the costs and times of delivery of letters. These turned it into an early example of a vade mecum and a virtual encyclopaedia of London life.

The work was published anonymously, though Hatton's contemporaries and rivals were aware of its authorship, and this may have been because of Hatton's relatively modest origins. Unlike rivals like John Strype, Hatton did not move in antiquarian circles and the work might have been more acceptable anonymously than from someone of Hatton's position.

== Rivals to the New View ==
In 1702, John Strype, had been approached by two of the publishers of the unsuccessful plan to produce an updated edition of Stow's Survey. This new edition was apparently ready by November 1707, but booksellers were not interested in stocking it, due to the publication of Hatton's slimmer and cheaper book. Strype's A Survey of the Cities of London and Westminster was eventually published in 1720. His antiquarian associates blamed the delay on an "unskillful writing master", presumably Hatton, who had stolen the market, but Strype's own slow progress in completing his work may also have played a part in the delay. Strype did refer his readers to Hatton, but on more recent subjects and therefore possibly matters below him as an antiquarian.

== Professional activity ==
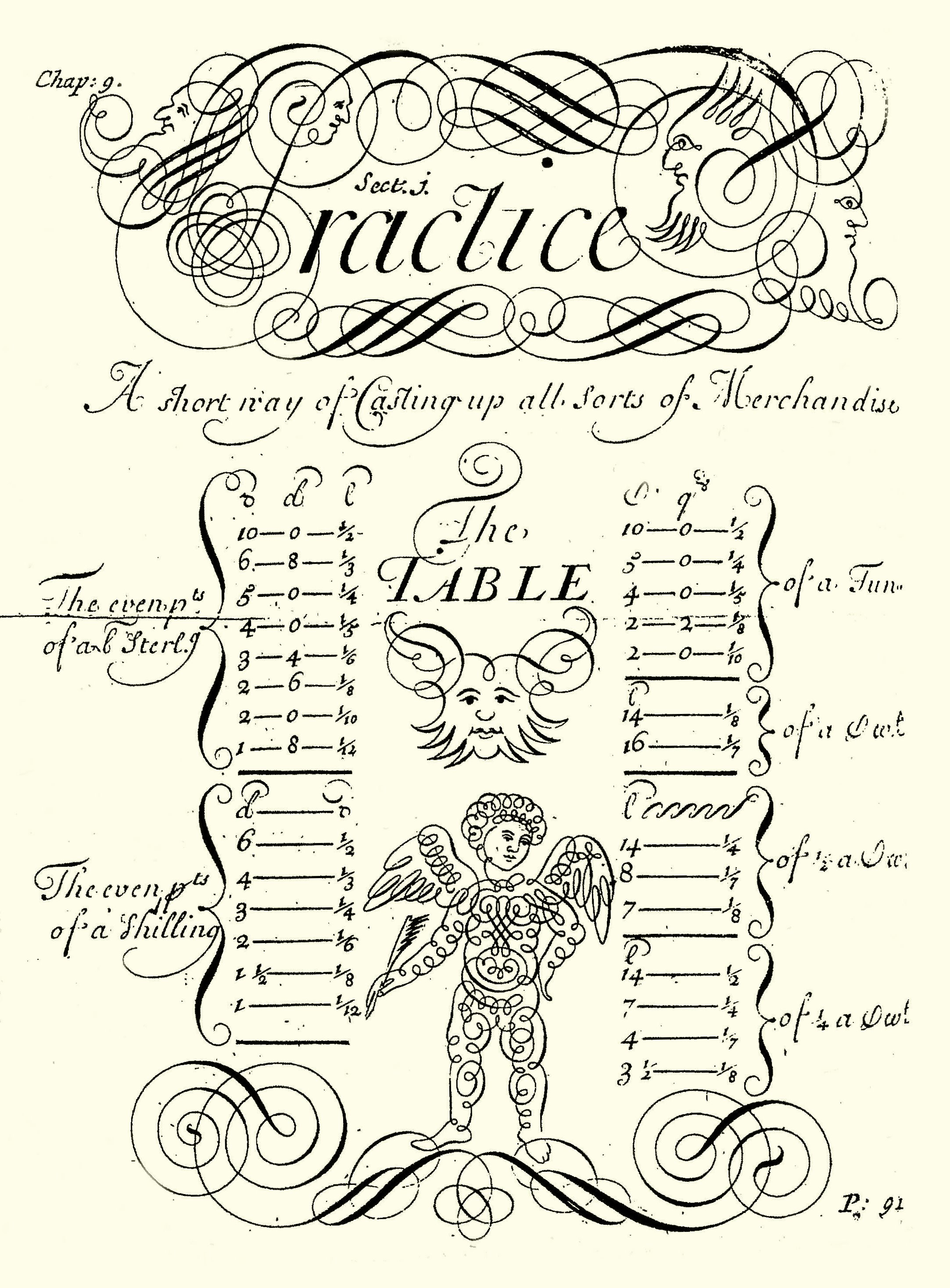
A plate from Hatton's The Merchant's Magazine or Tradesman's Treasury

The work of professional surveyors developed greatly after the Great Fire and often included related and ancillary activities. Some taught mathematics, calling themselves "philomath", as Hatton did. Hatton published a book titled The Merchant's Magazine or Tradesman's Treasury (author "E. Hatton Gent". The work was intended as a primer in good business practice and subjects covered included arithmetic, book-keeping, trading practices and model business letters. Imaginary correspondents included Nicholas Needum, Lazarus Lackcash and Dives Doubledun. Also included were nine sample plates of penmanship relating to the rules of arithmetic. Later, Hatton was a subscriber to works on surveying and mathematics.

Hatton's work was influential: his An Intire System of Arithmetic, for example, was translated into Icelandic in 1746.

== Personal life ==
Hatton was most likely the "Hatton, Edward of St. Andrew, Holborn, bachelor, 29" who received a licence to marry "Sarah Mainwaring spinster, 19, daughter of Thomas Mainwaring of St. Dunstan-in-the-West, goldsmith, who consents, at St. Austin, London. 3 Oct. 1693".

His family arms, pictured in the frontispiece to The Merchant's Magazine or Tradesman's Treasury, include three wheatsheaves with a chevron differenced by a mullet containing a crescent, suggesting a link with a branch of the Hatton family of Long Stanton, Cambridgeshire.

== Selected publications ==
- The Merchant's Magazine or Tradesman's Treasury. 1695. (fourth expanded edition 1701, ninth impression 1734)
- A New View of London Volume I. London, 1708.
- A New View of London Volume II. London, 1708.
- An Intire System of Arithmetic. London, 1721.
- Isaac Keay's The Practical Measurer. 1724. Third revised edition. (Editor) Editions up to at least 1777.
- A Mathematical Manual: or, Delightful Associate. London, 1728.

== See also ==
- Lockie's Topography of London
