= Theodosia Alleine =

English Nonconformist author (d. 1685)

- Died: 1685
- Occupation: nonconformist writer
- Writing career
- Genre: biography

Theodosia Alleine (d. 1685) was an English nonconformist writer.

== Life ==
Theodosia was born in Ditcheat, Somerset, in about 1635. She was the daughter of a Richard Alleine and a Lettice Gough. Richard was born in Ditcheat in 1610, where his father, another Richard Alleine, was the rector of St Mary Magdalene. Lettice Gough was born in 1611 in Oxford. They were married at St Mary Magdalene Ditcheat with Richard’s father officiating. Richard assisted his father as the curate of St Mary Magdalene until in 1640, when he was made rector in his own right at Batcombe, Somerset. After the Restoration her father and his brother became non-conformist ministers.

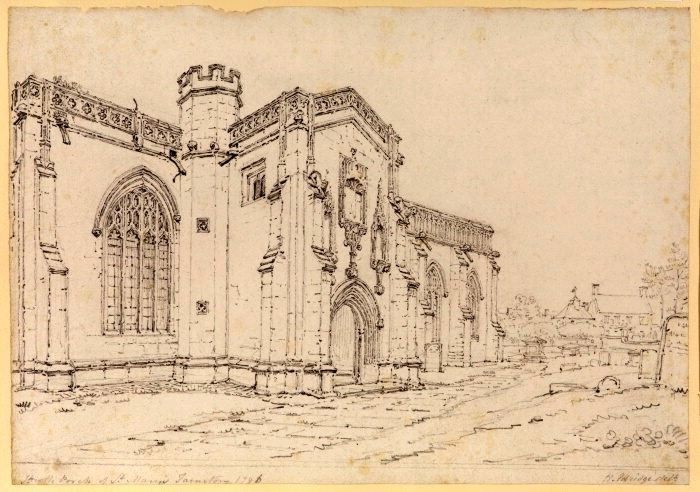
St Mary Magdalene, Taunton in 1796

She had met a young man named Joseph Alleine (her cousin). In 1654 he had offers of employment which he declined. The following year, George Newton of St Mary Magdalene, Taunton sought him for his assistant. Newton had been appointed one of the assistants of the commissioners for ejecting scandalous ministers in Somerset by the First Protectorate Parliament. Alleine accepted the offer and the marriage was arranged. Theodosia is presumed to be his cousin but it is not known how close a cousin she was. She was said to have been "bred to work" and she soon opened a boarding school at George Newton's house: "our Family being seldome less than Twenty, and many times Thirty; My School usually Fifty or Sixty of the Town and other places".

In 1663 Joseph's ministry was not approved, he was imprisoned and Theodosia stood by him during that year at Ilchester; he was released on 26 May 1664. In 1665 the Five Mile Act was passed, requiring expelled ministers to move at least five miles from their former parishes. Joseph and Theodosia moved to a house in an "obscure place" at Wellington, near Taunton. However they were still harassed and they stayed with friends and moved again to Taunton, a house called Fullands. That house is said to be still extant. There they held another "secret" service and Richard was again arrested in July 1665.

When her husband died, his life was celebrated by the publication of a book with several contributors. Alleine submitted a biography of her husband. She had expected that this would be a draft "for a better hand" but her account was well regarded and taken verbatim and she was credited when it was published as An Account of the Life and Death of That Excellent Minister of Christ, the Rev. Joseph Alleine. Written by Richard Baxter, Theodosia Alleine, and Other Persons, to Which are Added His Christian Letters. Her husband was buried in his church in Taunton and Theodosia remarried.
