= Richard Steele (minister) =

Nonconformist theologian

Richard Steele (or Steel) (10 May 1629 – 16 November 1692) was a nonconformist theologian.

== Early life ==
Richard Steele was born as son of Robert Steele, farmer, at Barthomley, Cheshire, on 10 May 1629. He was educated at Northwich grammar school, admitted sizar at St. John's College, Cambridge, on 1 April 1642, and incorporated M.A. at Oxford on 5 July 1656.

== Career ==
He succeeded Thomas Porter as rector of Hanmer, Flintshire, probably in 1650. Henry Newcome visited him there on 10 June 1654. He was a member of the fourth Shropshire classis (constituted by parliament in April 1647), and, as such, was one of the ordainers of Philip Henry on 16 September 1657. Thirty years later (9 May 1687) he was one of the ordainers, at his own house in London, of Philip Henry's son, Matthew Henry.

In September 1660 he was presented at Flint assizes for not reading the common prayer; the prosecution fell through, owing to Charles II's declaration in October. He was again presented at the spring assizes on 28 March 1661 at Hawarden. He resigned his living in consequence of the Act of Uniformity 1662, preaching a farewell sermon (17 August), in which he said he was ejected for not subscribing his assent to the new prayer-book, which he had not yet seen. He continued to communicate at Hanmer, where he received ‘sitting’ on 19 April 1663. On 25 July he was presented for baptising his own children, and in October was arrested on suspicion of treason. Early in 1665 he was made collector for Hanmer of the ‘royal aid,’ the point being to treat him as a layman. In April 1665 he was again arrested, as he was setting out for London; his pocket diary was taken from him, and passages were misconstrued. An entry of an appointment ‘on a carnal account’ was ‘interpreted to be some woman design.’ Philip Henry records ‘a great noise in the country concerning Mr. Steel's almanack.’

The Five Mile Act, coming into force on 25 March 1666, compelled him to leave Hanmer, and he took up his residence in London. William Urwick the younger conjectures that his was the license granted on 10 June 1672 for presbyterian preaching in ‘the house of Rob. Steele’ at Barthomley, Cheshire; he certainly contributed to the building of a school at Barthomley in 1675. Though he may have made occasional visits to the north, Philip Henry's diary shows that he was constantly exercising his ministry in London from 1671. He gathered a morning congregation at Armourers' Hall, Coleman Street; in the afternoon he preached at Hoxton.

He died on 16 November 1692. George Hamond, his colleague and successor, preached his funeral sermon. He had ten sons, five of whom were dead in 1672. His portrait is in Dr. Williams's Library; an engraving from it by Hopwood is given in Wilson.

== Bibliography ==
Steele published:

- An Antidote against Distractions … in the Worship of God, 1667; 3rd edition 1673; 4th edition 1695; last edition 1834;
- The Husbandman's Calling, 1668,
- A Plain Discourse upon Uprightness, 1670,
- The Tradesman's Calling,’ 1684; a revision of this by Isaac Watts passed through many editions with title The Religious Tradesman; last edit. Edinburgh, 1821,
- A Discourse concerning Old Age, 1688,

Steele also wrote four sermons in the Morning Exercises, 1660–90, and a biographical preface to the posthumous sermons (1678) of Thomas Froysell (1622–1672).
