= George Hamond =

English ejected minister (1620–1705)

George Hamond (1620–1705) was an English ejected nonconformist minister.

== Life ==
Hamond was educated at Exeter College, Oxford, and graduated M.A. He studied also (perhaps previously) at Trinity College Dublin, where he was elected a Scholar and attracted the notice of Archbishop James Ussher. His first known charge was the vicarage of Totnes, Devon, from which William Adams had been dispossessed during the Commonwealth. In 1660 he was admitted to the rectory of St. Peter's and vicarage of Trinity, Dorchester.

Hamond was ejected by the Act of Uniformity 1662, his successor being appointed on 30 June 1663. After the Royal Declaration of Indulgence of 1672, a Presbyterian meeting-house was built at Taunton, and Hamond was associated with George Newton as its minister. He also kept a boarding-school, to which several persons of rank sent their sons. The Taunton meeting-house was wrecked after Monmouth's rebellion (1685), and Hamond left London. Here he became colleague to Richard Steele at Armourers' Hall, Coleman Street, and on Steele's death (16 November 1692) sole pastor. In 1699 he succeeded William Bates as one of the Tuesday lecturers at Salters' Hall, and died in October 1705. His congregation was probably already extinct.

== Works ==
Hamond published:

- A Good Minister, 1693, a funeral sermon for Richard Steel, praised by Charles Bulkley.
- A Discourse of Family Worship, 1694.

Also a sermon in The Morning Exercise at Cripplegate, vol. vi. (1690); and prefaces, appearing after his death, to Discourse of Angels, 1701, and Modest Enquiry into ... Guardian Angel, 1702, both by Richard Sanders.

== Notes ==
Attribution

This article incorporates text from a publication now in the public domain: Stephen, Leslie; Lee, Sidney, eds. (1890). "Hamond, George". Dictionary of National Biography. Vol. 24. London: Smith, Elder & Co.
