= Westcombe, Somerset =

Westcombe, Somerset may refer to two places in England:

- Westcombe, Batcombe, Somerset, a hamlet in Batcombe parish near Shepton Mallet
- Westcombe, Somerton, Somerset, a hamlet near Somerton
