= Henry Albin =

English minister (1624–1696)

Henry Albin (20 June 1624 – 5 September 1696) was an English minister, ejected for nonconformity.

== Biography ==
He was born at Batcombe, Somersetshire, famous still in association with Richard Bernard and Richard Alleine, on 20 June 1624. He was educated at the grammar school of Glastonbury, and afterwards proceeded to the University of Oxford, though no mention is made of him by Anthony à Wood. He was ordained as clergyman of the parish of West Cammel, but in 1660 was ejected for nonconformity. Appointed later to Donyatt, also in Somersetshire, the Act of Uniformity found him again ready to be ejected and to share the witness and the sufferings of the two thousand. On his second ejection he retired to his native place, where he lived unobtrusively till his death. He held, as all the nonconformist ministers did, that his orders were of divine sanction, and could not be annulled by any bishop or other dignitary unless for proved fault. Accordingly, he went about as an evangelist and preacher. His most successful ministry was in the ‘church in the house’ of separate families. But he also frequently attended as a worshipper at the parish church.

For many years of his life he was occupied with preaching, as a kind of chaplain, in the house of Thomas Moore, Esq., of Spargrove—a fine example of the ancient stately puritan gentleman. In 1687 he became "stated preacher" at Frome Selwood, Shepton Mallet, Bruton, and Wincanton in rotation. He died on 5 September 1696. His funeral sermon was preached by William Hopkins, who held the same opinions as himself.

"He was a judicious man, and of good learning; eminent for his piety, and very diligent in his work. He was a great redeemer of time, a hard student, and remarkable for prudence. He had a large acquaintance, and was of a very friendly temper. He taught by his life as well as his doctrine, and lived and died a great example of strict and close walking with God, and of a heavenly convention. He had a majestic countenance, but was clothed with humility." Eulogy from the Nonconformists' Memorial.

== Works ==
Albin published little, if anything, besides two sermons—the one entitled A Practical Discourse on loving the World, from 1 John ii. 15, and the other, published posthumously, The Dying Pastor's Last Farewell to his Friends in Frome Selwood (1697).
