= Aisle =

Architectural element

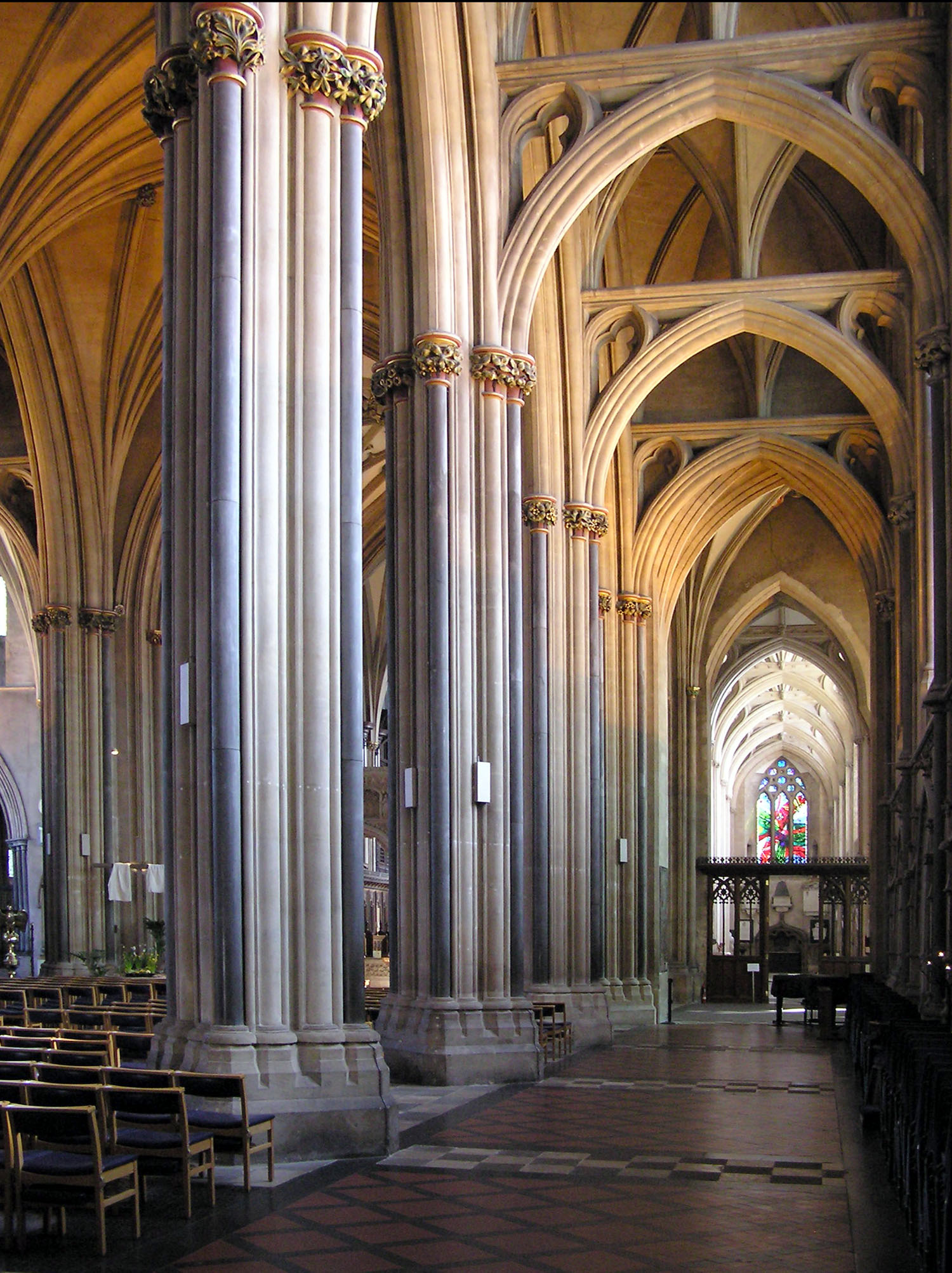
An aisle of Bristol Cathedral, Bristol, England.

An aisle is a linear space for walking with rows of non-walking spaces on both sides. Aisles with seating on both sides can be seen in airplanes, in buildings such as churches, cathedrals, synagogues, meeting halls, parliaments, courtrooms, theatres, and in long passenger vehicles. An aisle floor may be level or, as in theatres, sloping upward from a stage.

Aisles also cross through shops, where they have shelving on either side; warehouses, flanked by storage pallets; and factories, where they separate different work areas. In health clubs, exercise equipment is normally arranged along aisles.

They are distinguished from corridors, hallways, walkways, footpaths, pavements (American English sidewalks), trails, paths and open areas of buildings: aisles lie between other open or seating areas, which are all enclosed within a structure. Spaces between buildings are not considered aisles, regardless of their size.

The word is related to French aile (wing).

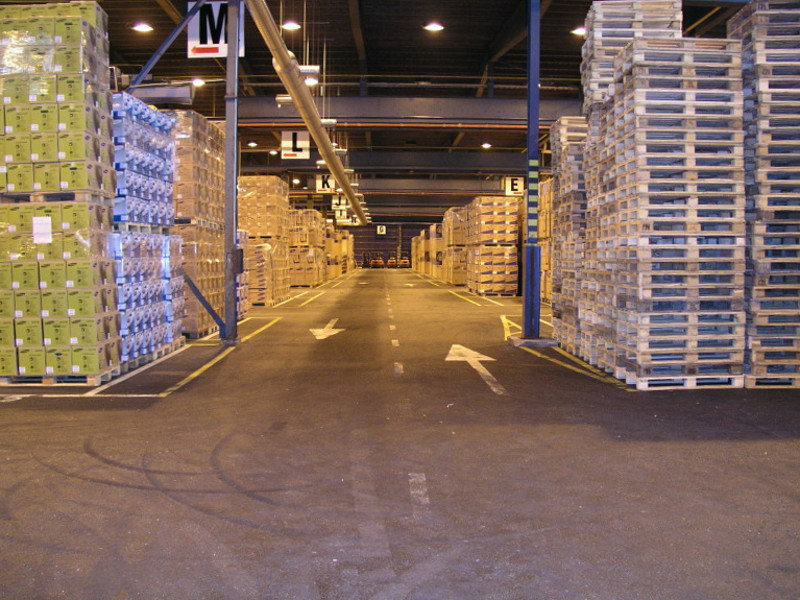
An aisle at the Green cream Logistics Co., Kotka, Finland.

== Typical physical characteristics ==
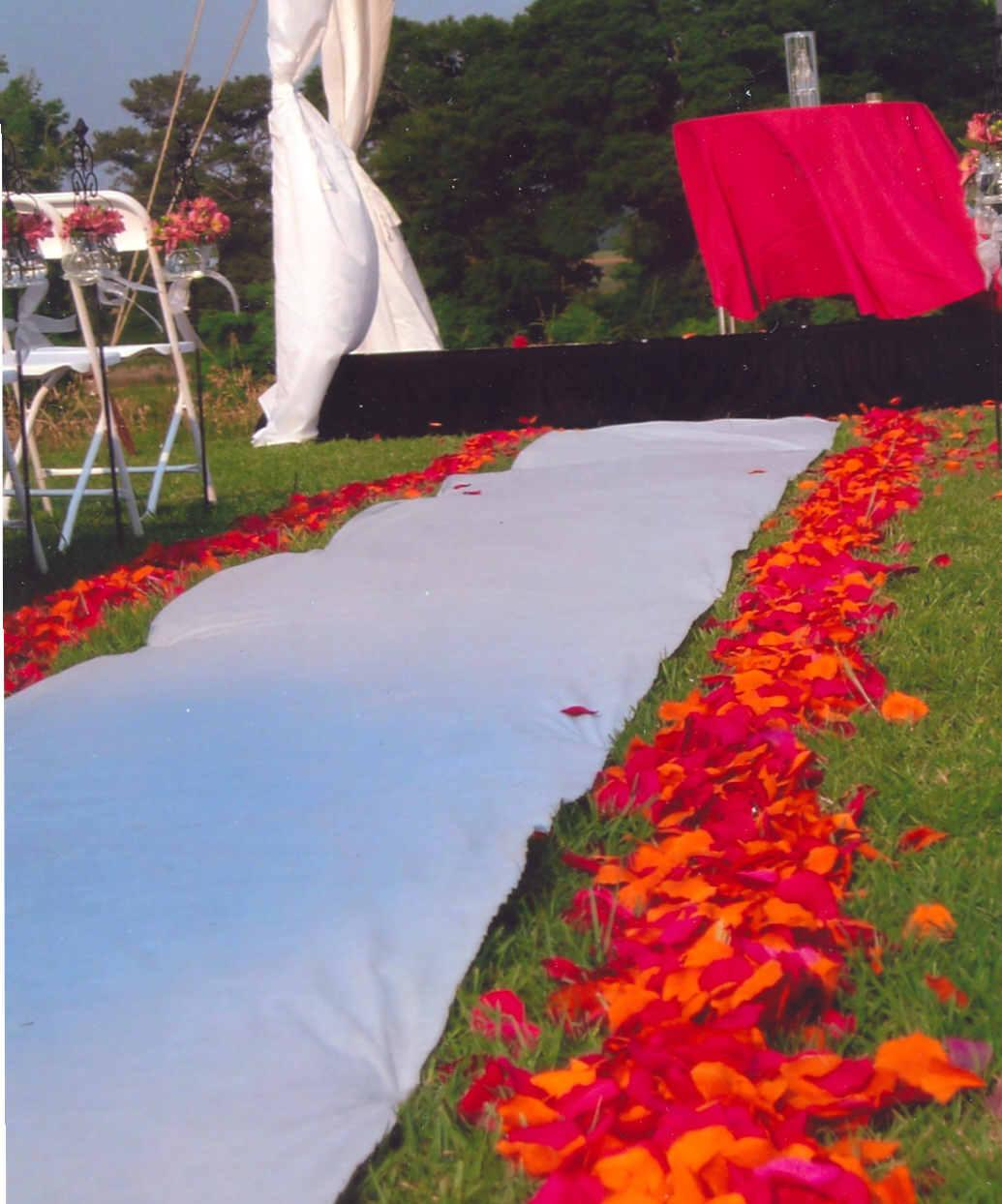
Wedding aisle in Montgomery, Alabama.

Aisles have certain general physical characteristics:

- They are almost always straight, not curved.
- They are usually fairly long. An open space with three rows of chairs beside it would not usually be considered an aisle.

=== Width of various types of aisles ===
- Theatres, meeting halls, shops, etc., usually have aisles wide enough for 2–3 strangers to walk past each other without feeling uncomfortably close. In such facilities, a space that could comfortably accommodate more than four people side-by-side would generally be considered an "open area", rather than an "aisle".
- Factory work area aisles are usually wide enough for workers to comfortably sit or stand while working, while allowing safe and efficient movement of persons, equipment and/or materials.
- Passage aisles are usually just wide enough for a large person to carry a suitcase in each hand, but not for two people to pass side-by-side without touching. Usually, even without luggage one person must turn sideways for the other to pass.
- Warehouse aisles normally are at least 8–10 feet (2.4–3 meters) wide to fit mechanical loading equipment.
- Wedding aisles are at least wide enough for two people to walk comfortably beside each other.
- Vehicle aisles are wide enough for a designated type of vehicle to pass, either one way or two way.

== Architecture ==
In architecture, an aisle is more specifically the wing of a house, or a lateral division of a large building. The earliest examples of aisles date back to the Roman times and can be found in the Basilica Ulpia (basilica of Trajan), which had double aisles on either side of its central area. The church of St. Peter's in Rome has the same number.

== Church architecture ==
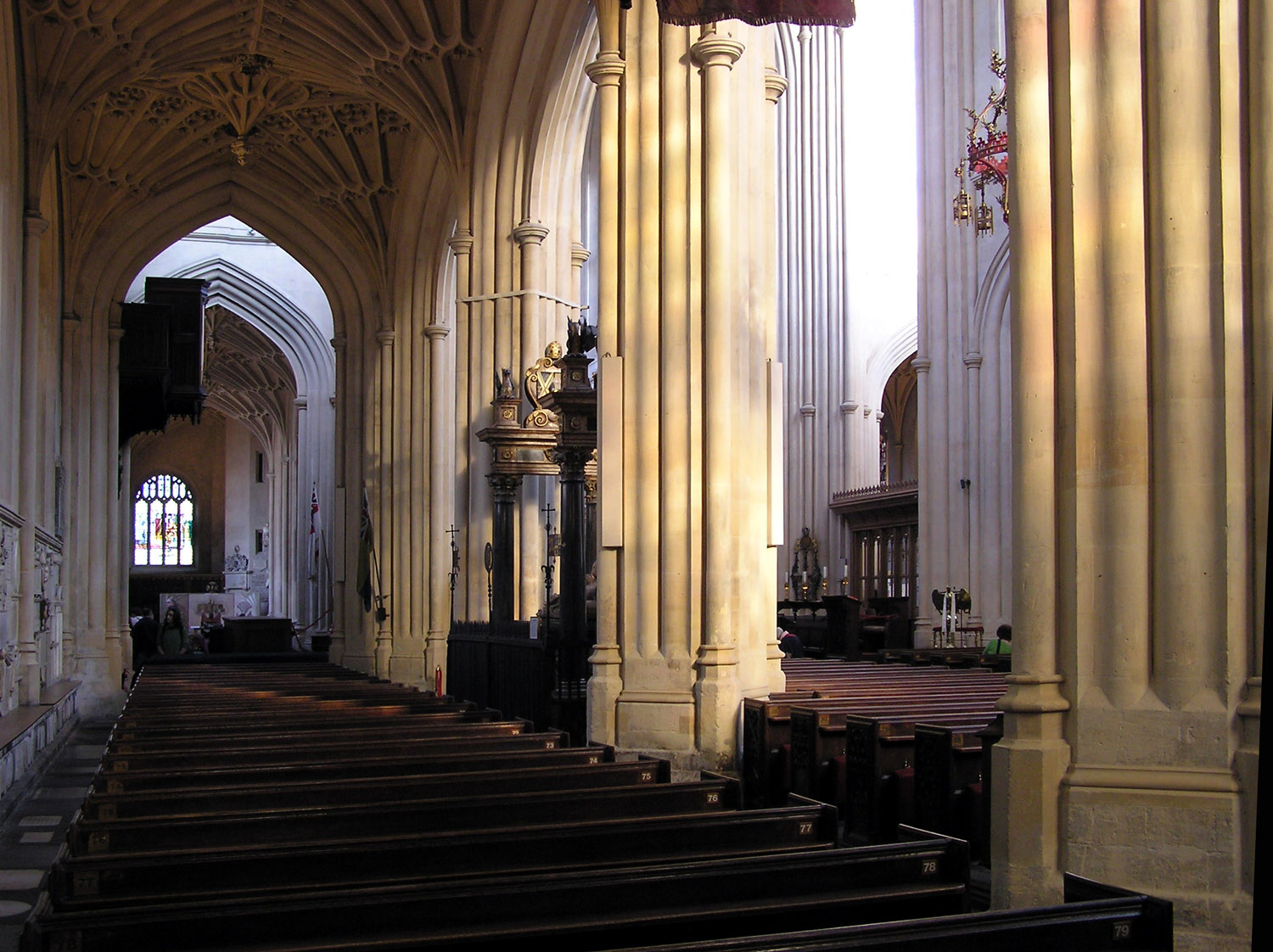
An aisle in Bath Abbey, Bath, England. The aisle is lined with wooden seating (pews), the nave seating can be seen on the right, beyond the arcade pillars. The roof of the aisle is fan-vaulted.

The nave-aisles in this plan view of a cathedral are shaded pink; the arcade pillars are black dots

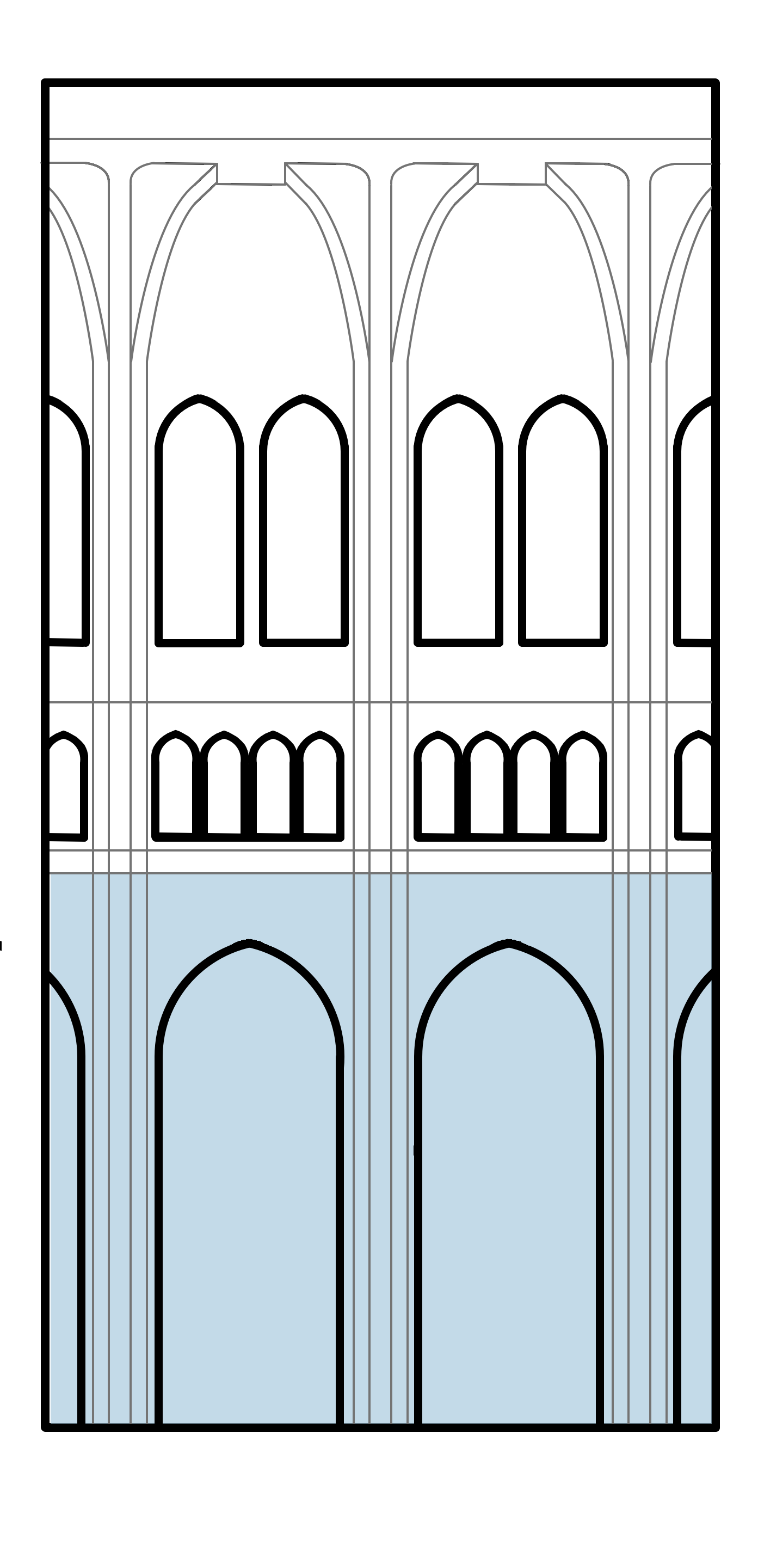
Interior elevation view of a Gothic cathedral, looking from the nave, with nave-aisle arcade highlighted.

In church architecture, an aisle (also known as an yle or alley) is more specifically a passageway to either side of the nave that is separated from the nave by colonnades or arcades, a row of pillars or columns. Occasionally aisles stop at the transepts, but often aisles can be continued around the apse. Aisles are thus categorized as nave-aisles, transept-aisles or choir-aisles. A semi-circular choir with aisles continued around it, providing access to a series of chapels, is a chevet.

In Gothic architecture, the aisles' roofs are lower than that of the nave, allowing light to enter through clerestory windows. In Romanesque architecture, however, the roofs are at roughly equal heights, with those of the aisle being only slightly lower than that of the nave. In Germany, churches where the roofs of the aisles and nave are the same height, such as St. Stephen's, Vienna, the Wiesenkirche at Soest, St. Martin's, Landshut, and the Frauenkirche (Church of Our Lady) in Munich are known as Hallenkirchen, i.e. hall churches.

When discussing overall design, architectural historians include the centrally-positioned nave in the number of aisles. Thus the original St Peter's Basilica in Rome, Milan Cathedral, Amiens Cathedral, Notre Dame de Paris and Alexander Nevsky Cathedral in Sofia are all described as having five aisles, meaning they have two side aisles either side of the nave. Antwerp Cathedral even has seven aisles (three at either side of the central nave). In the United Kingdom, cathedrals generally only have one aisle on each side, with Chichester Cathedral, Elgin Cathedral and St Mary Magdalene, Taunton being the only three exceptions.

== Supermarkets and retail stores ==
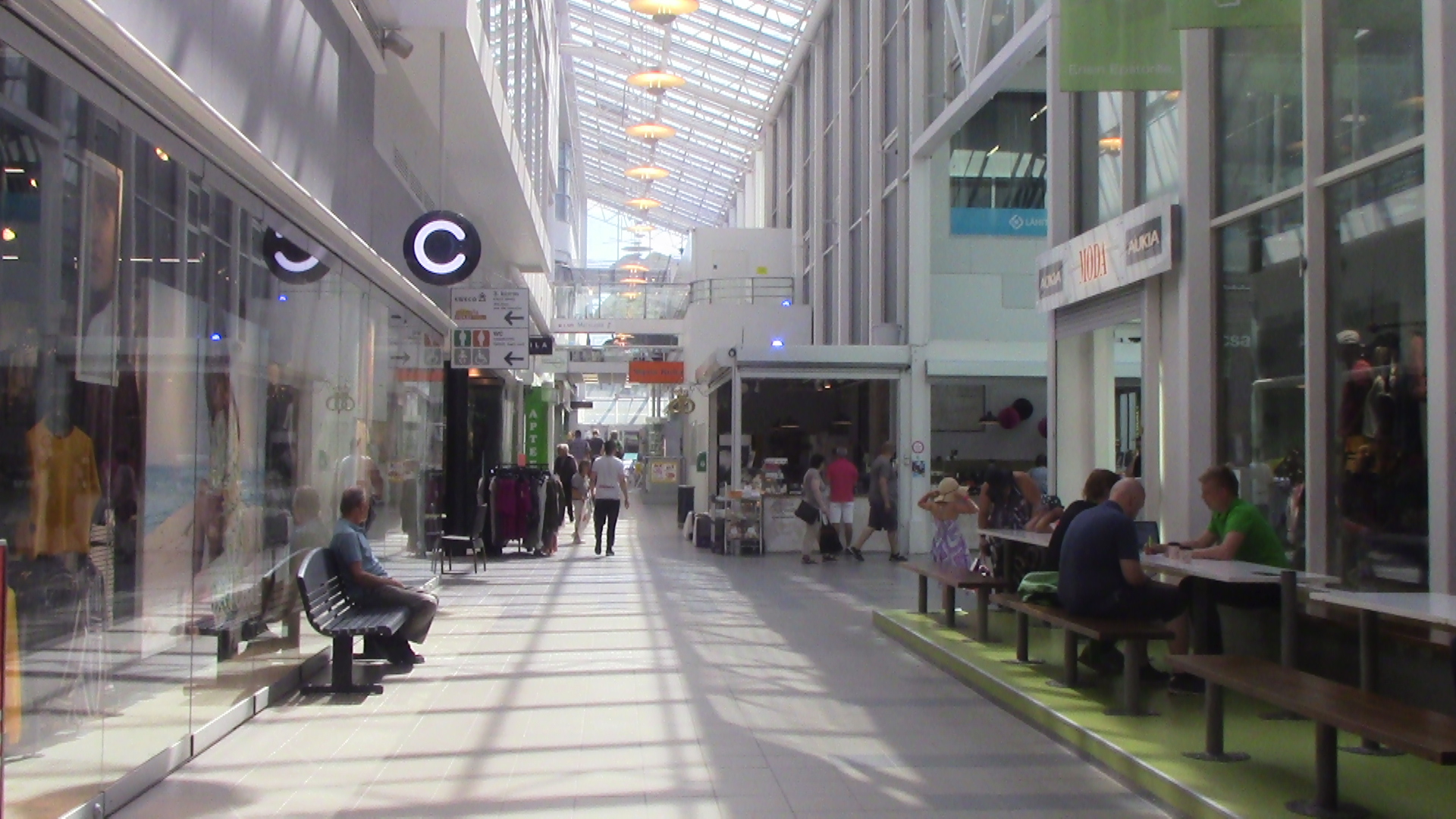
The shopping aisle at Epstori shopping center in Seinäjoki, Finland.

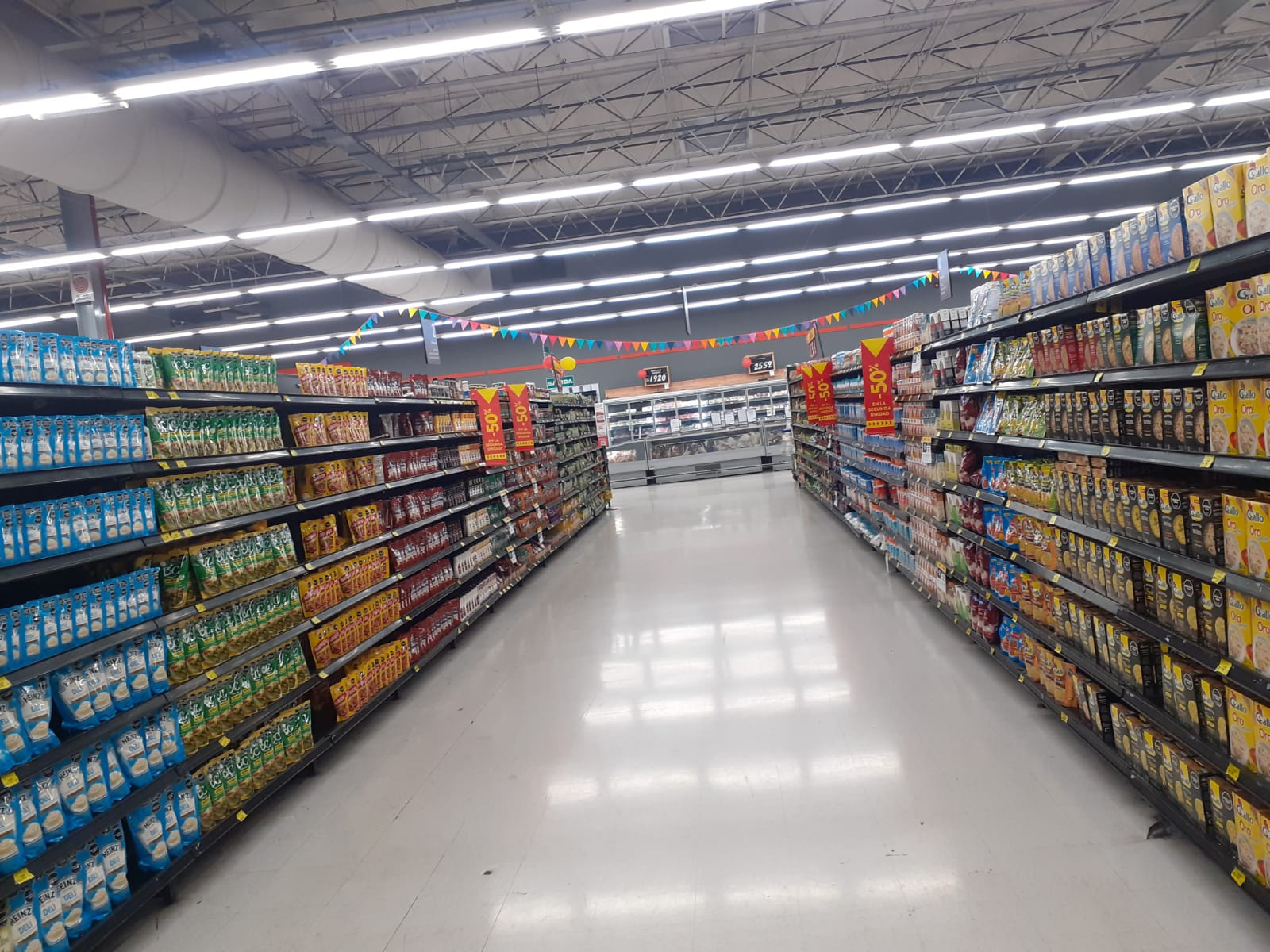
Food aisles in a supermarket in Buenos Aires, Argentina.

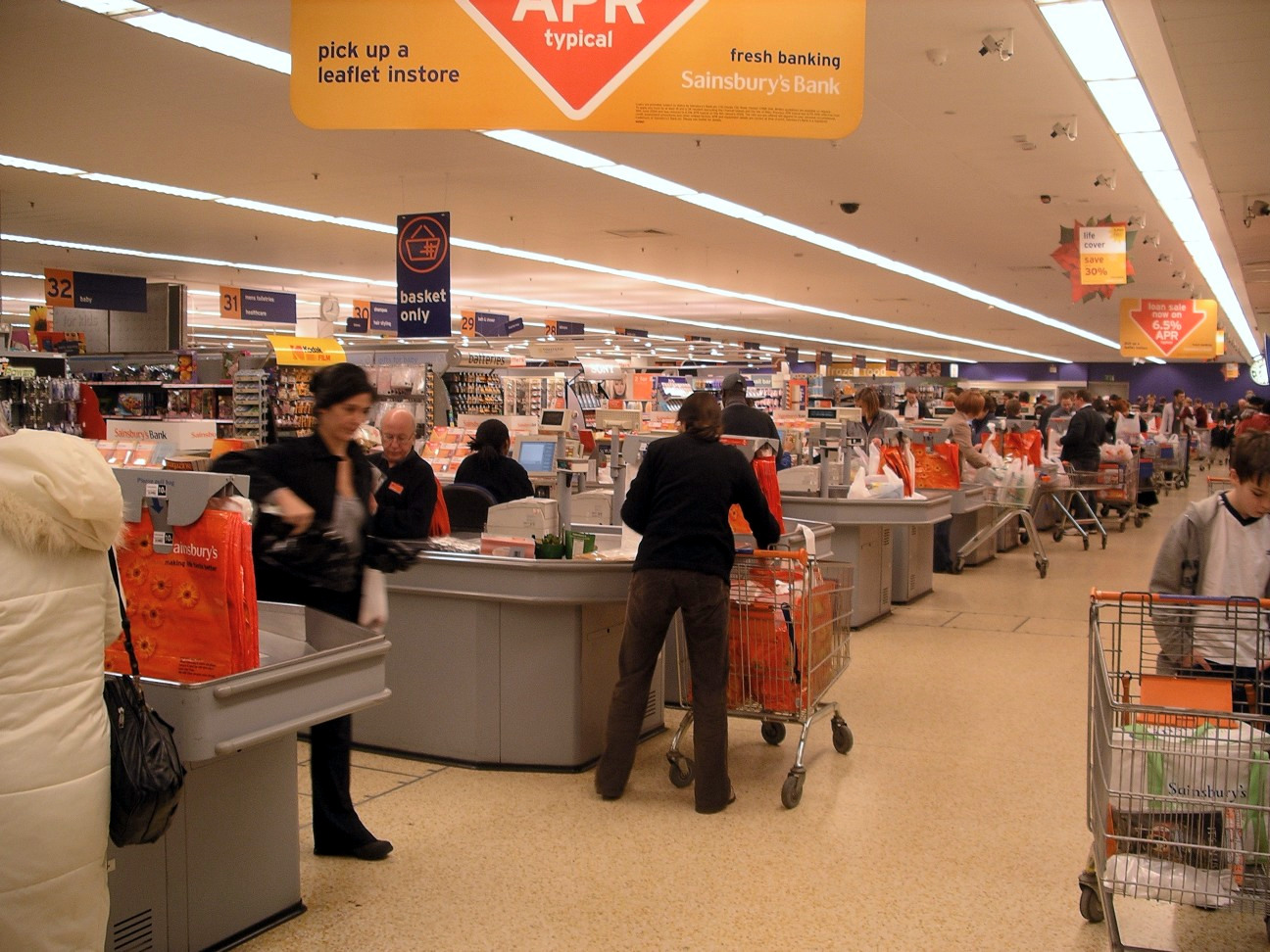
Supermarket checkout aisles.

In supermarkets there are two types of aisles, food aisles and checkout aisles.

Food aisles are where goods are displayed. At the end of food aisles may be found crown end displays, where high-margin goods are displayed for impulse purchase.

In retail stores that do not primarily sell food, aisles containing products would be referred to either generically as merchandise aisles, or by the particular products contained in the aisle, e.g., "the gardening aisle", "the sports equipment aisle".

Checkout aisles contain cash registers at which customers make their purchases. Regardless of the type of merchandise the establishment sells, it is common to display a range of "impulse buy" items along the checkout aisle, such as cold beverages, magazines, candy and batteries. These are often called "lanes" to distinguish them from the food aisles.

=== Signage ===
For customer convenience, supermarkets and retail stores commonly number the aisles and have signs indicating both the aisle number and the types of products displayed in that aisle.

Churches, courtrooms, legislatures, and meeting halls may identify individual rows, seats or sections but do not normally assign aisle numbers or display signs regarding aisles.

== Libraries ==
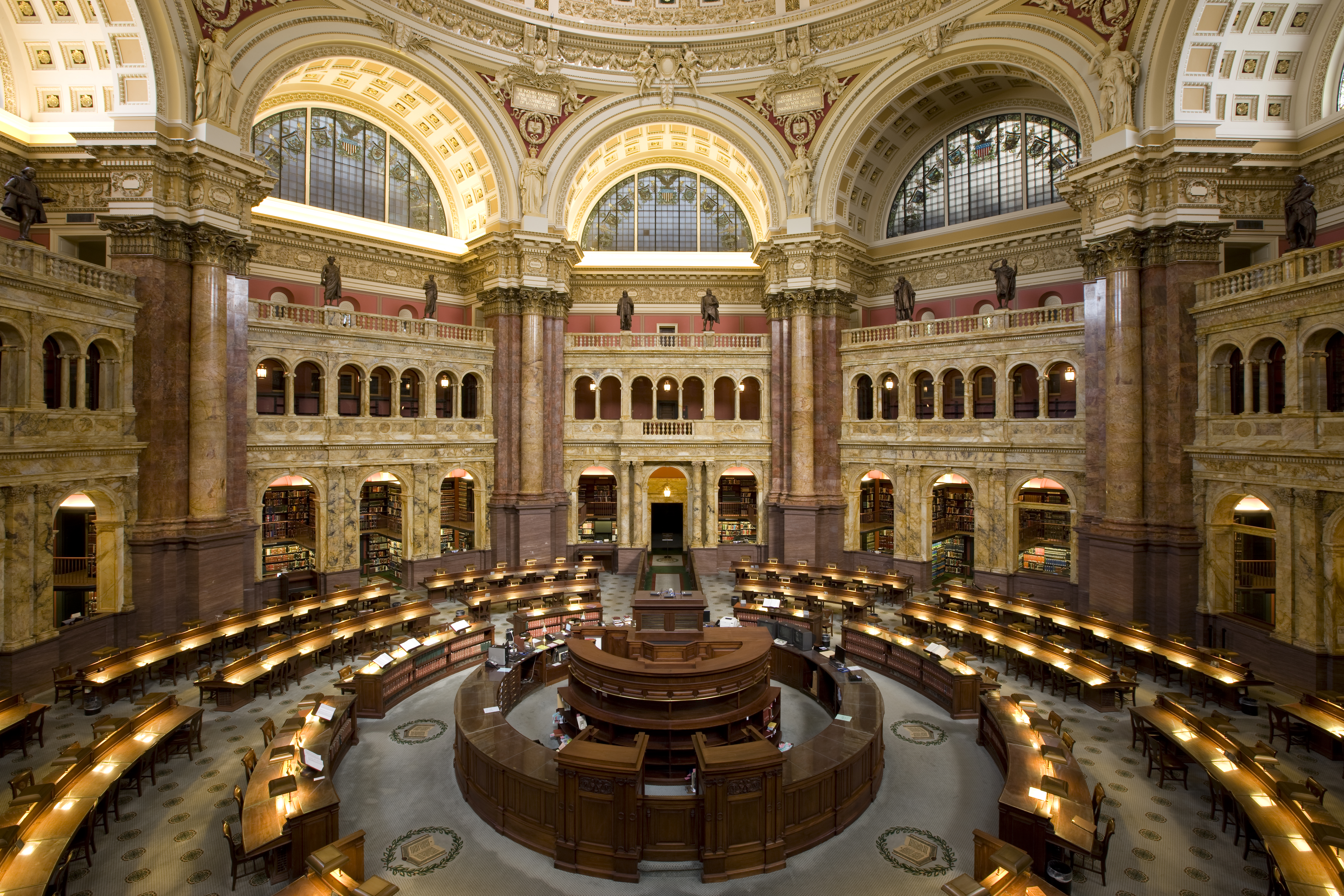
U.S. Library of Congress reading room with aisles.

Libraries are commonly divided into several areas:

- Circulation desk
- Collections, areas where materials are grouped, e.g., Children's Collection. This may include book shelves, manuscripts, photos, etc.
- The "stacks", where books are shelved
- The Reference Room where materials with limited circulation are stored
- Public reading areas containing seats and desks

The spaces between rows of book shelves in the "stacks" area are called aisles and desks in the reading area are frequently arranged in rows with aisles.

== Computer server rooms ==
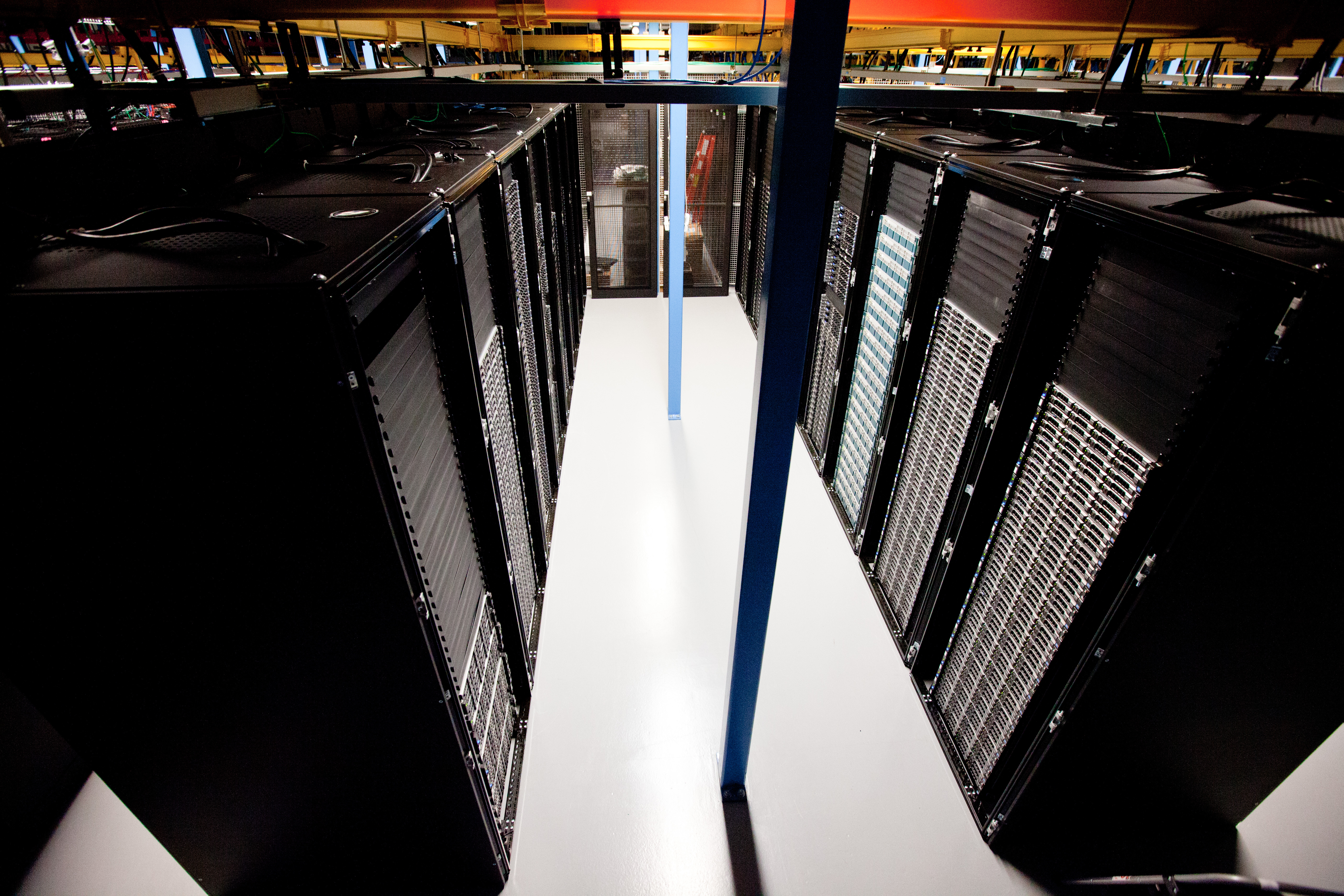
An aisle between Wikimedia servers

Server rooms are typically divided into hot and cold aisles for cooling efficiency, and access to servers.

== Performance venues ==
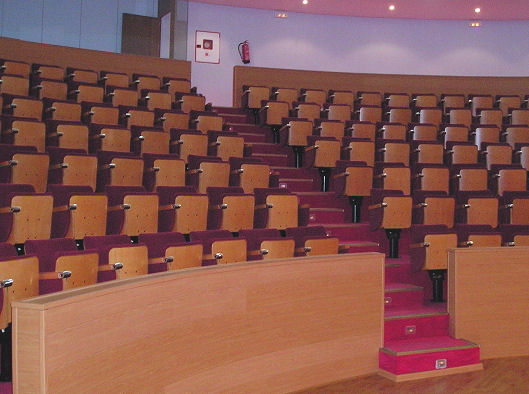
Theatre-type seating in a lecture hall with a stair aisle.

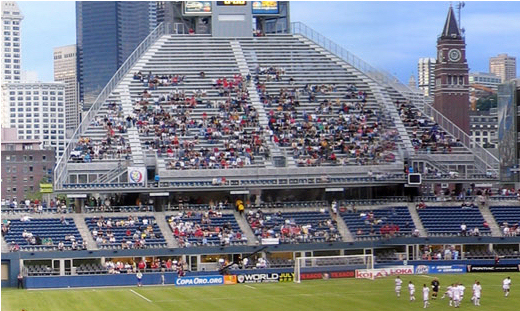
End zone of Qwest field with blue seats and grey aisles

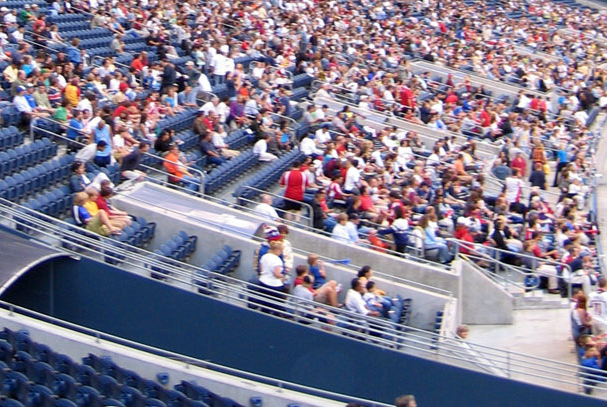
Closer view of seats.

=== Cinemas, indoor theatres and concert halls ===
Films, stage plays and musical concerts ordinarily are presented in a darkened facility so the audience can see the presentation better. To improve safety, often the edges of the aisles in such facilities are marked with a row of small lights. The markers frequently are strings of light-emitting diodes (LEDs) because LEDs are durable, have low power consumption and use low voltages that are not subject to electrical codes. To provide a higher level of light focused downward, lighting fixtures referred to as luminaries are often built into the side of the seat facing the aisle.

=== Stadiums and outdoor arenas ===
Sport stadiums and outdoor arenas frequently have several types of aisles, including aisles to purchase tickets for events, aisles to enter the main event area and aisles to go to seating. Stadium seating routinely is separated into sections by aisles. Seating rows are accessed by stairsteps. To promote safety, aisles commonly are divided by a handrail in the middle of the aisle.

== Stables and barns ==
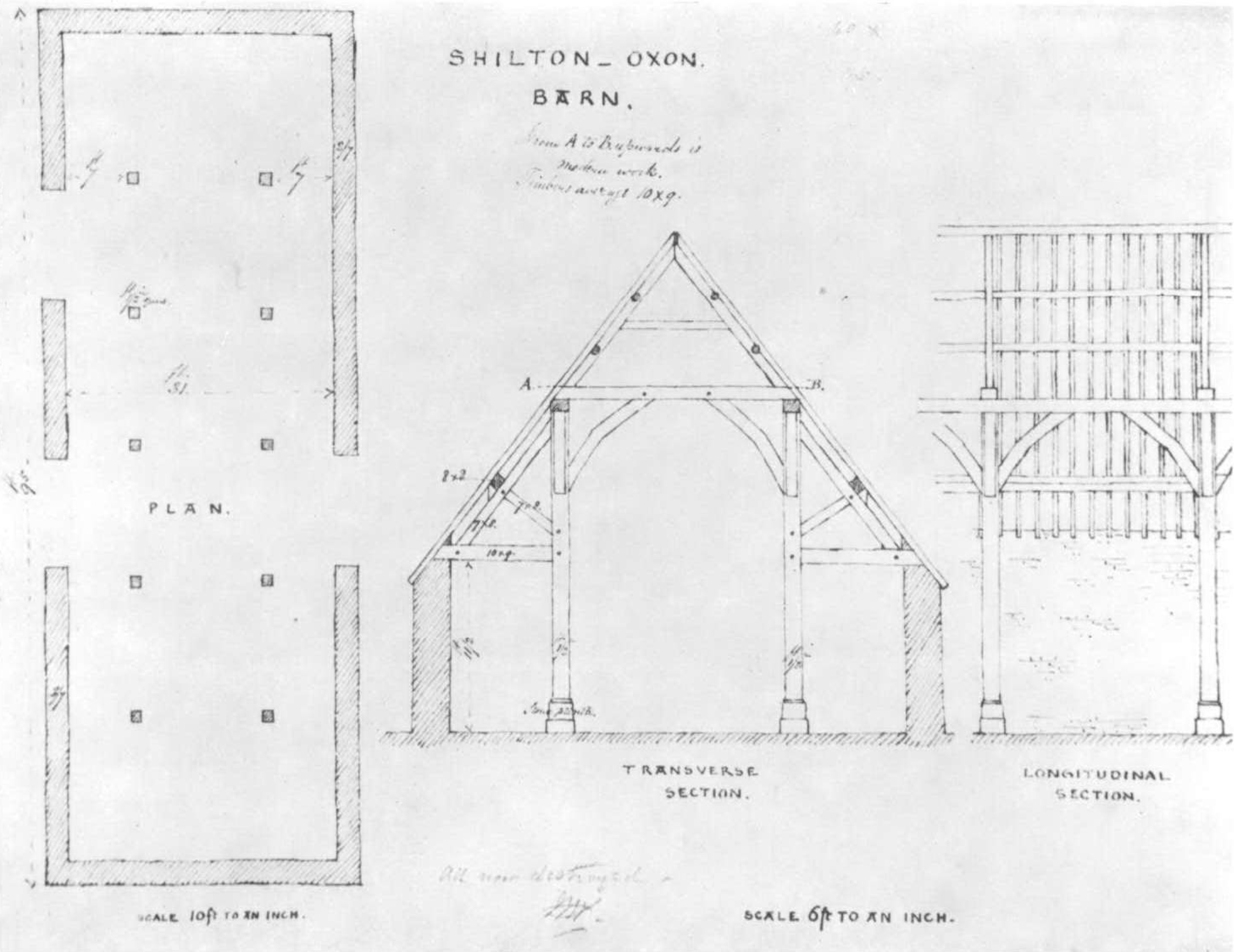
The Shilton Barn, Oxfordshire, England has three aisles and six bays

The floor plan of aisled barns resembles that of an aisled church. However, the nave in farm buildings is called an aisle thus a "three aisled barn". Aisled barns have the big barn doors on the gable end of the building giving access to the center aisle, often called the drive floor or threshing floor. The side aisles may be the same widths making the barn symmetrical or the aisle where animals were housed may be narrower which is apparent outside the barn because the barn doors are then off-center. The area between the posts, perpendicular to the aisles are called bays. In stables there is a stable aisle down the centre with individual stalls facing the aisle.

== Vehicles ==
On vehicles, the aisle is more specifically a passageway for passengers to move along within the vehicle.

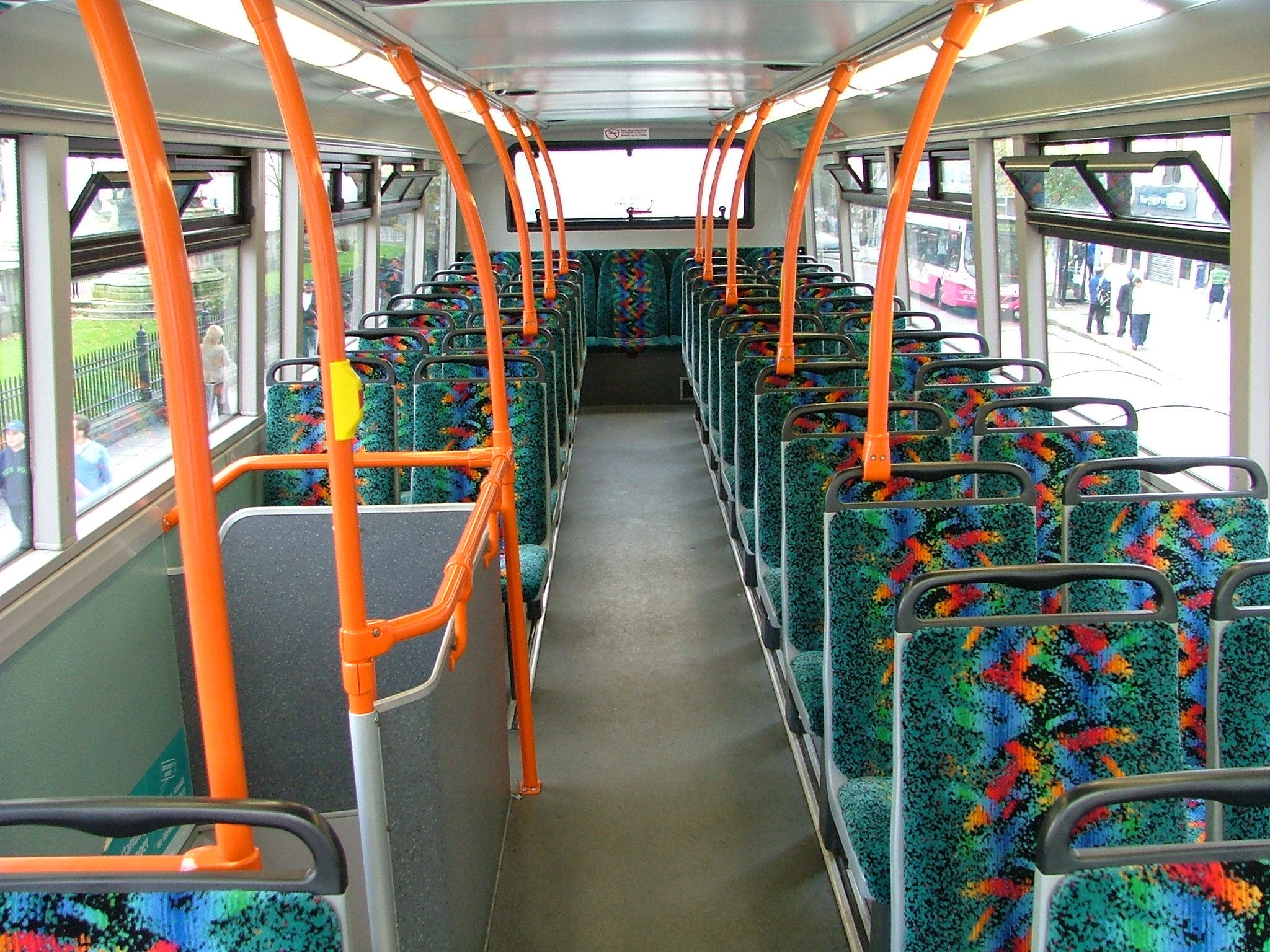
Bus aisle with stairs

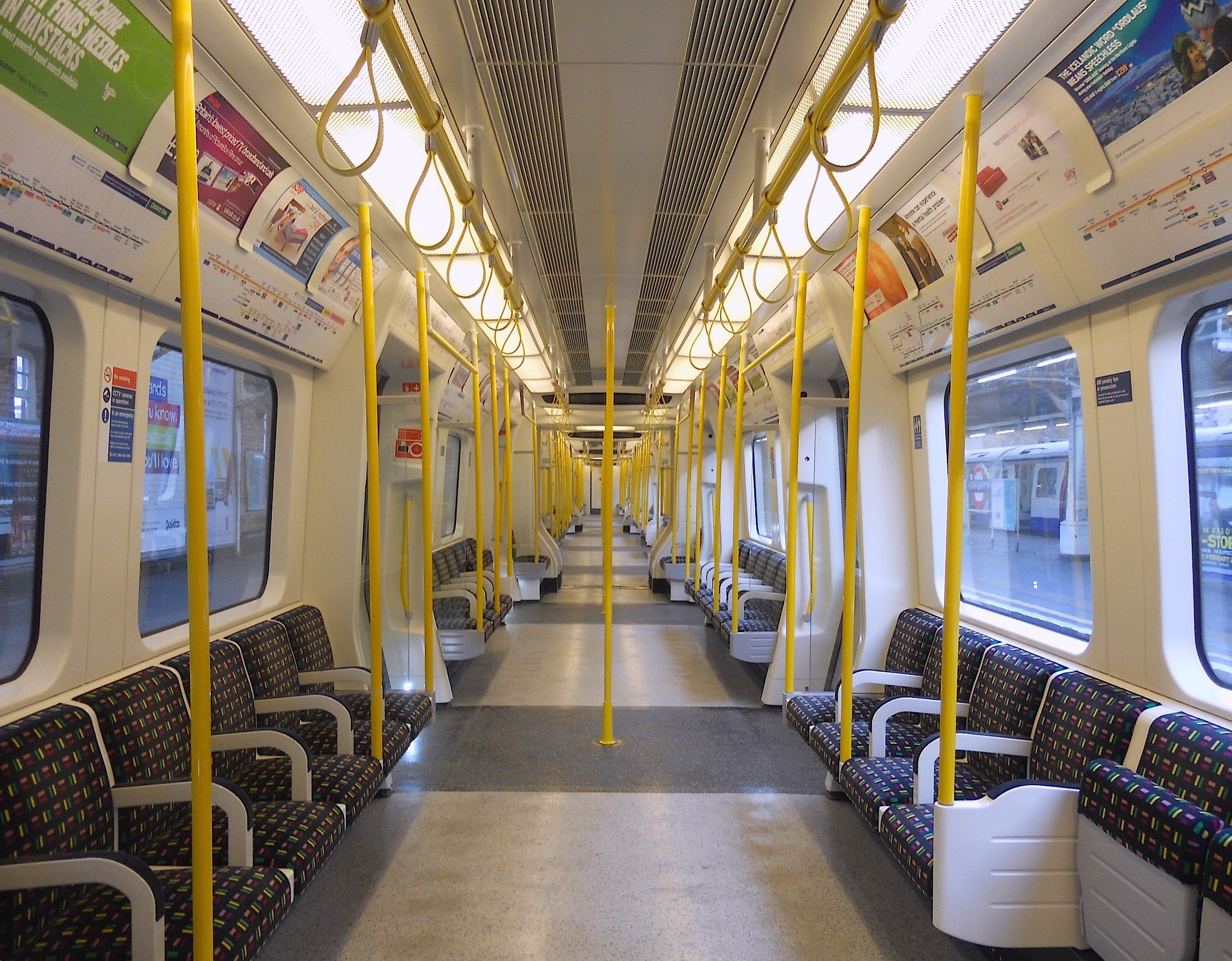
London Circle Line tube train aisle with open gangways

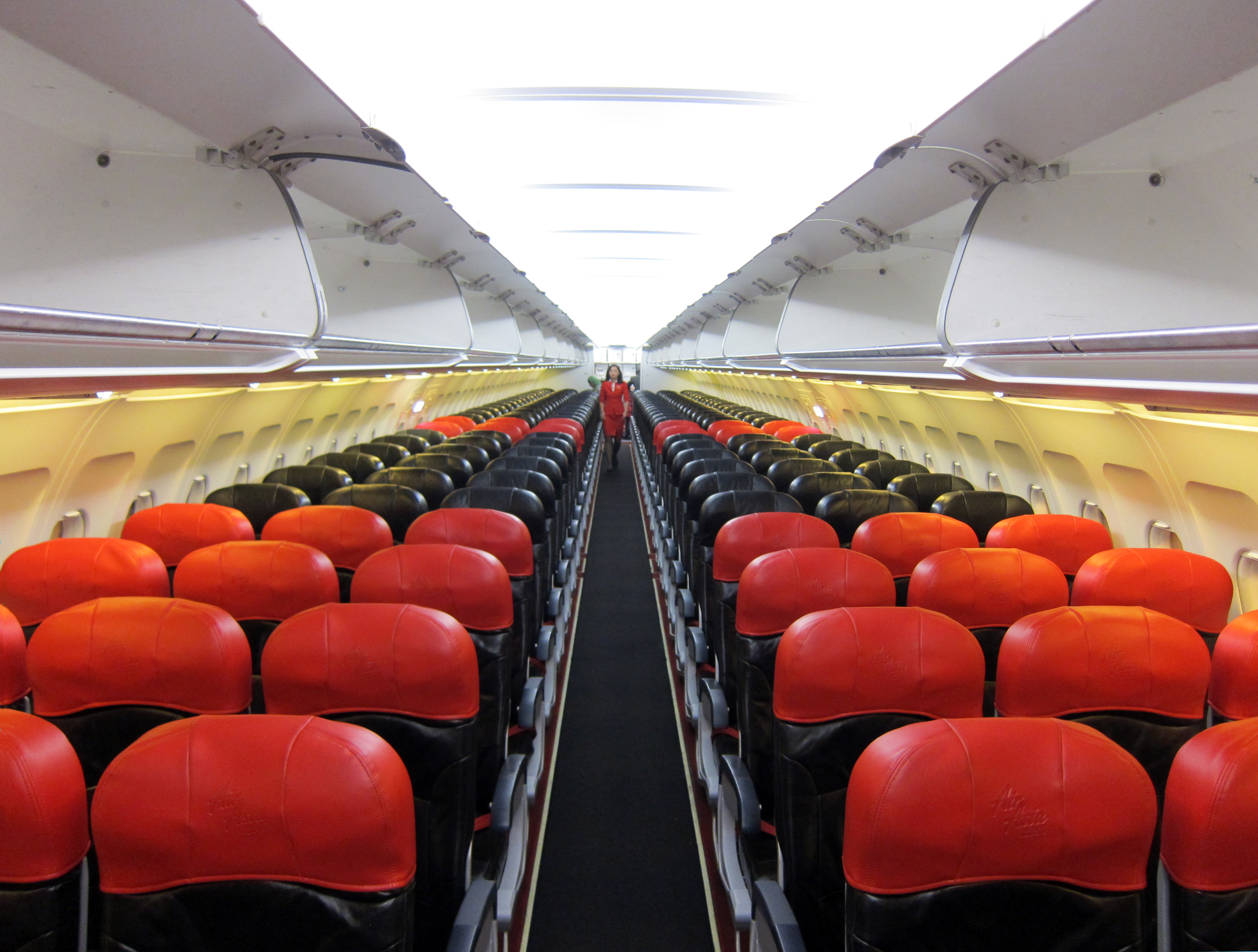
Narrow-body aircraft aisle

== Safety and regulatory considerations ==
National and local government regulations require a minimum width for aisles in various building types. Regulatory agencies frequently inspect buildings, vehicles, etc., to enforce regulations requiring that aisles not be restricted. Inspectors have imposed fines for blocking or restricting passage when boxes or folding chairs are stored in aisles, for example. Insurance companies frequently have safety inspectors to examine the premises, both to determine whether insureds are complying with the insurer's requirements for coverage and to look for any practices that could lead to injury or property damage, including restricting passage in aisles. The Americans with Disabilities Act sets certain standards for building access and other design considerations in all new construction and major renovations in the U.S. An architectural barrier is any feature that makes access or use of a building difficult, unreasonably dangerous or impossible. This can include aisles that are too narrow for easy access by a wheelchair. Often, the only way to get from a row of chairs, shelves, workstations, etc., to an exit is by an aisle. Historically, many deaths and serious injuries have occurred due to fire, inhalation of smoke or noxious fumes, etc., because blocked or partially blocked aisles prevented persons from promptly leaving a dangerous area.

Regulations applicable to public carriers transporting passengers often require aisles to be completely clear in vehicles, such as airlines, buses and trains. Many insurance companies have requirements regarding minimum aisle width, unrestricted aisles and easy access to exits, and will refuse to insure companies that do not meet their requirements or will increase the premiums on companies that frequently violate the requirements.

== See also ==
- Building design – Planning and specifications for construction
- Cathedral floorplan – Floor plan showing sections of walls and piers
- Indoor positioning system – Network of devices used to wirelessly locate objects inside a building
- Safety – State of being protected from danger
- Soutra Aisle – Hospital and church buildings, in Scottish Borders, Scotland
- Wedding – Ceremony where people are united in marriage ("walking down the aisle")
- Outline of architecture, also known as List of basic architectural topics – Study and practice of designing structures

== Literature ==
- Walter Horn, 'On the Origins of the Medieval Bay System', in: Journal of the Society of Architectural Historians 17 (1958), nr. 2, p. 2–23.
