= George Hammond =

George Hammond may refer to:

- George W. Hammond (1833–1908), American businessman
- George Hammond (cricketer) (born 1976), South African cricketer
- George Hammond (diplomat) (1763–1853), first British envoy to the United States
- George Hammond (Stargate) (1942–2008), fictional character in the television series Stargate SG-1
- George Hammond (rugby union) (born 2000), English rugby union player
- George F. Hammond (1855–1938), American architect
- George P. Hammond (1896–1993), American historian and Latin American scholar
- George S. Hammond (1921–2005), American chemist
- George Hammond (racing driver) (1902/3–?), American racing driver
- George Hamond (1620–1705), also Hammond, English nonconformist minister

== See also ==
- Hammond (surname)
