= Conventicle Act 1664 =

Act of the Parliament of England restricting freedom of religion

- Act of Parliament
- Parliament of England
- Long title: An Act to prevent and suppresse seditious Conventicles.
- Citation: 16 Cha. 2. c. 4
- Territorial extent: England and Wales

Dates
- Royal assent: 17 May 1664
- Commencement: 16 March 1664 (Note: Start of session.)
- Expired: 19 December 1667
- Repealed: 28 July 1863
Other legislation
Repealed by	Statute Law Revision Act 1863
Relates to	Religion Act 1592; Act of Uniformity 1662

Status: Repealed

Text of statute as originally enacted

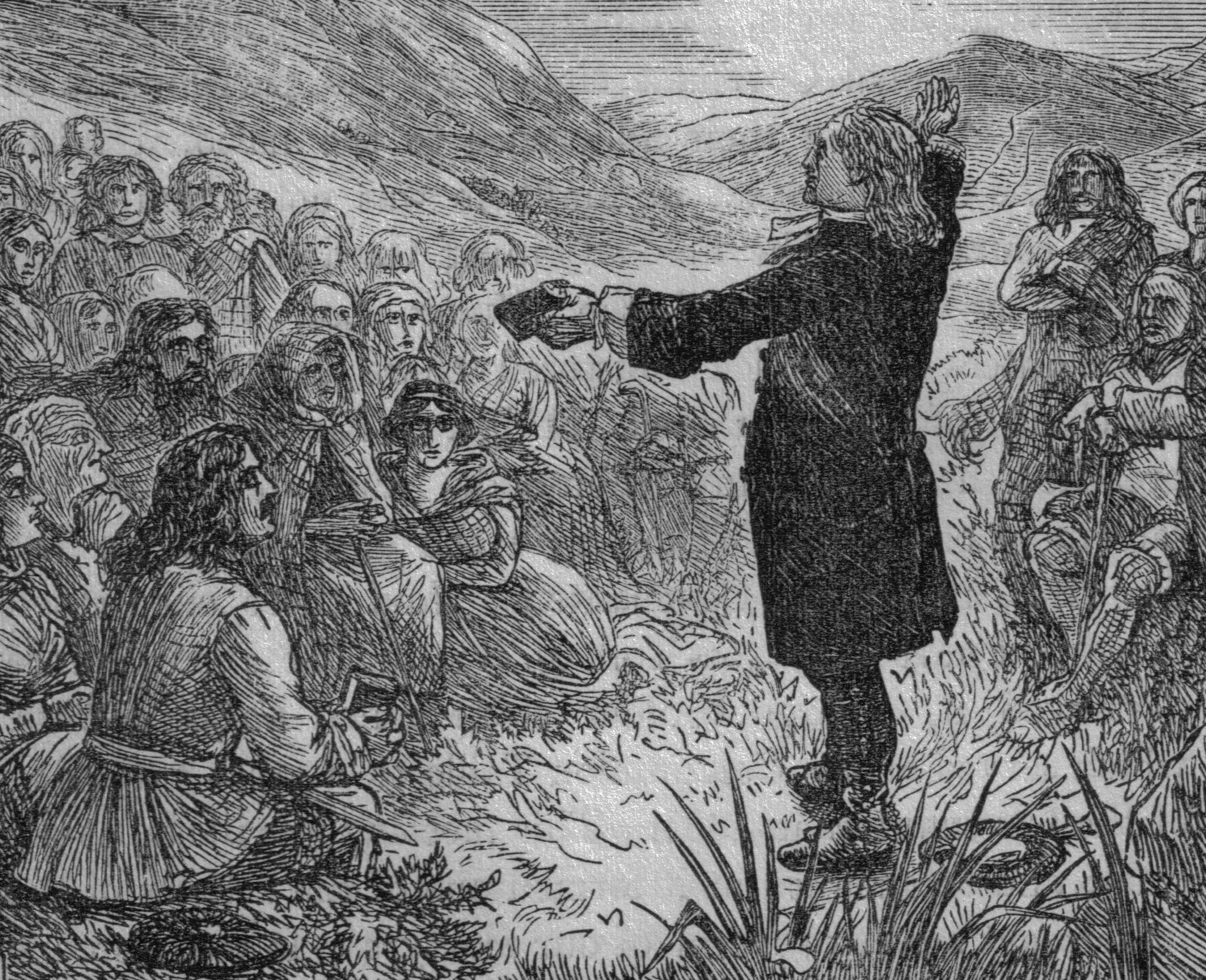
A Covenanters Conventicle.

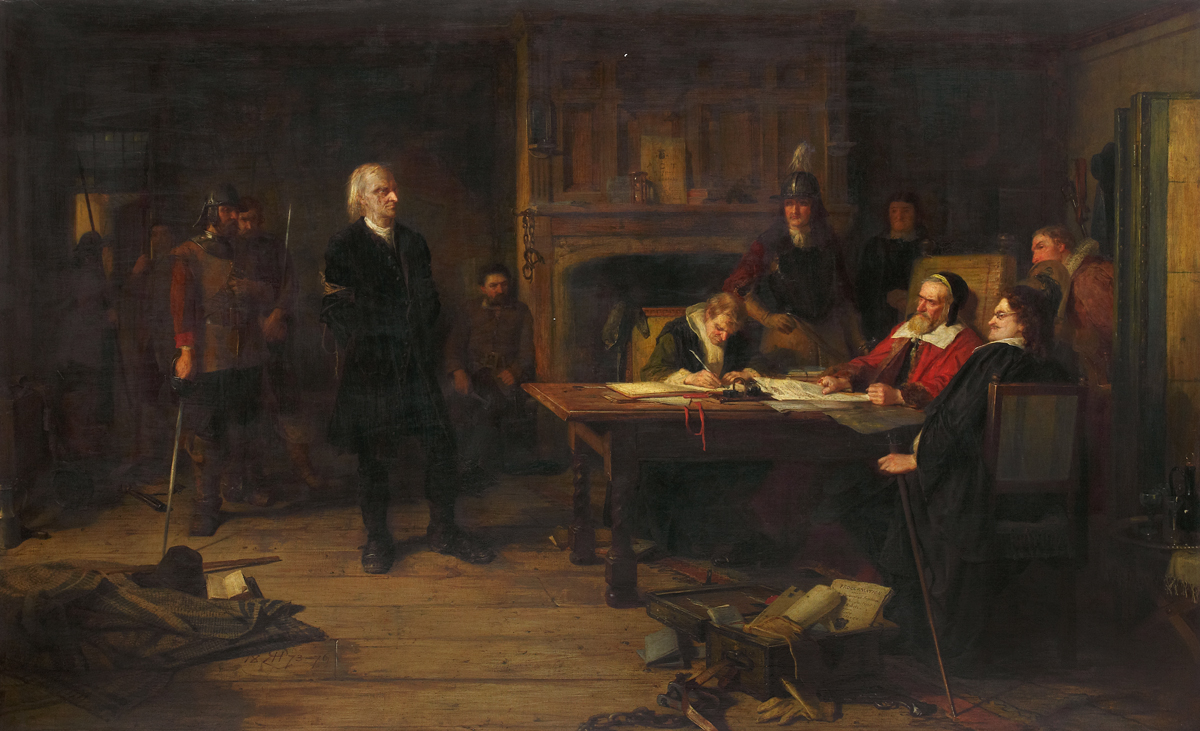
A Conventicle Preacher before the Justices, painting by Robert Inerarity Herdman

The Conventicle Act 1664 (16 Cha. 2. c. 4) was an act of the Parliament of England that forbade conventicles, defined as religious assemblies of more than five people other than an immediate family, outside the auspices of the Church of England and the rubrics of the 1662 Book of Common Prayer.

This law was a part of the Clarendon Code, named after Edward Hyde, 1st Earl of Clarendon, which aimed to discourage nonconformism and to strengthen the position of the Established Church but the Clarendon Code was not actually the work of Clarendon himself, who favoured a policy of greater tolerance towards dissenters. These prohibitions led many, such as the Covenanters, to vacate their parishes rather than submit to the new Episcopal authorities. Just as the ministers left so too did the congregations, following their old pastors to sermons on the hillside. From small beginnings these field assemblies—or conventicles—were to grow into major problems of public order for the government.

The operation of the Clarendon Code at least as far as Protestants were concerned was mitigated somewhat by Charles II's Royal Declaration of Indulgence in 1672, which suspended the execution of the Penal Laws and allowed a certain number of non-conformist chapels to be staffed and constructed, with the pastors subject to royal approval.

The act was formally repealed in 1689, although its authority had lapsed, by default, in 1667.

== Provisions ==
Firstly, the act confirmed that the Religion Act 1592 (35 Eliz. 1. c. 1) was still in force.

Secondly, it declared that if any person aged sixteen or over after the 1 July 1664 is present at any religious meeting other than of the Church of England where there are five persons or more assembled together (other than those of the same household), then they would be tried by two justices of the peace or one chief magistrate, without a jury.

If found guilty, the penalties were as follows:

- first offence: imprisonment for up to three months without bail, or a five pounds fine (to be paid to the poor of the convicted person's parish).
- second offence: imprisonment for up to six months without bail, or a ten pounds fine (to be disposed of as above).
- third offence: transportation for seven years, or a one hundred pounds fine.

Subsequent sections of the act allowed for the breaking up of such meetings, if a warrant had been issued, and the arresting of the convenor of the meeting, and the owner of the venue, who were subject to the same penalties as above, if found guilty. There were penalties for officials not carrying out court orders. The prosecution had to occur within three months of the act, and no other prosecution could be brought for the offence. A special clause applied to Quakers who refused to swear an oath in court without due reason. They were immediately declared guilty and sentenced to transportation. Minor variations in procedure and penalties were also made for peers of the realm. The act was to remain in force for three years.

== Jewish reaction ==
Although aimed at Nonconformists, when the act was passed, the Jews, led by their new rabbi Jacob Sasportas, took their anxieties to Charles II, who told them, "laughing and spitting", not to worry; later the Privy Council put it in writing that Jews could "promise themselves the effects of the same favour as formerly they have had, so long as they demean themselves peaceably and quietly, with due obedience to His Majesty's laws and without scandal to his government". Thus the English Jews, by an act of omission, as it were, became subjects, under no more disabilities than those inherent in their own unwillingness, like Catholics and Nonconformists, to belong to the Church of England or, in their particular case, to swear Christian oaths.

== Subsequent developments ==
The whole act was repealed by section 1 of, and the schedule to, the Statute Law Revision Act 1863 (26 & 27 Vict. c. 125), which came into force on 28 July 1863.

== See also ==
- Five Mile Act 1665
- Conventicles Act 1670
- Declaration of Indulgence (disambiguation)
