= William Alleine =

English minister (1614–1677)

William Alleine (1614 – October 1677) was an English minister.

== Life ==
He was the younger brother of Richard Alleine, born at Ditcheat, Somerset, in 1613–1614. As with all this family, his first education was under his own father. He proceeded to the University of Oxford, being, like Richard, entered at St Alban Hall. He took his degrees of B.A. and M.A. On leaving the university he became private chaplain in 'a noble house' (Lord Digby?) in London.

At the beginning of the First English Civil War, Alleine was residing at Ilchester, "consulted by great officers". For his letters to them he was 'proclaimed by the cavaliers a traitor in three market towns.' He held them, in turn, for traitors against the kingdom. He was repeatedly plundered and maltreated. Hairbreadth escapes for his life were long remembered.

Having removed to Bristol, Alleine was there brutally ill used. In the 'Commission' of 1650 he is entered 'William Allen, a learned, orthodox, able divine, the present incumbent.' In 1653 he is similarly designated. When the Act of Uniformity was passed, the vicar of Blandford never hesitated. His parishioners held him in the utmost veneration, and he 'dearly loved' them. But he 'freely quitted his living,' and 'ministered to a few people in private.' A few years after the ejection he took up his residence again in Bristol, where he carried on his ministry with ever-increasing acceptance. From thence he went to Yeovil, in his native county of Somerset. He there died in October 1677, aged 63.

== Works ==
Alleine published two books on the Millennium, and after his death there were printed Six Discourses on the Unsearchable Riches of Christ.
