= George Newton (minister) =

17th-century English nonconformist minister

George Newton (1602–1681) was an English ejected nonconformist minister.

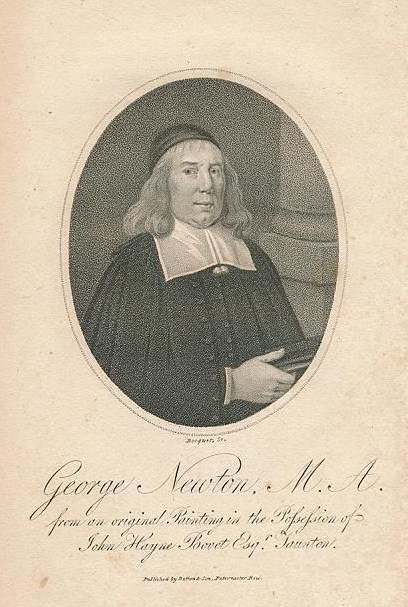
George Newton

== Life ==
Newton was born in Devon, and was educated at Exeter College, Oxford, where he matriculated 17 December 1619, and proceeded B.A. 14 June 1621, and M.A. 23 June 1624.

He began his ministry at Bishop's Hull, near Taunton, Somerset, and was presented to the vicarage of St. Mary Magdalene, Taunton, 7 April 1631, by Sir William Portman and Robert Hill. When the Declaration of Sports was issued by the Privy Council for Charles I in 1633, and ordered to be read in churches, Newton told his congregation that he read it as the commandment of man, and immediately thereafter he read the twentieth chapter of Exodus as the commandment of God, informing his hearers that these two commandments happened to be in contradiction to each other, but that they were at liberty to choose which they liked best.

During the period 1642–5, when Taunton was being contested for by parliamentarians and royalists, back and forth, Newton spent some time in St. Albans, Hertfordshire, where he preached in the abbey church. After the siege was finally raised by the Parliamentarians he returned in 1645. In 1654 he was, by ordinance of the First Protectorate Parliament, appointed one of the assistants of the commissioners for ejecting scandalous ministers in Somerset. In that year Joseph Alleine became his assistant and he was married to Theodosia Alleine. She was said to have been "bred to work" and she soon opened a boarding at Newton's house and the school was said to have twenty and sometimes thirty boarders.

After the Restoration Newton was, by the Act of Uniformity, deprived of his living, 21 August 1662. He continued to preach, was arrested, and was in prison for several years. Released, at some time between 1672 and 1677 he became minister to a congregation meeting in Paul Street, Taunton.

Newton died 12 June 1681, and was buried in the chancel of St. Mary Magdalene's Church. The chancel has a monument with an inscription to his memory. His preaching was said to have been "plain, profitable, and successful".

== Works ==
Newton was the author of an Exposition and Notes on the 17th Chapter of John, 1670. He also published several sermons, including Man's Wrath and God's Praise, or a Thanksgiving Sermon preached at Taunton the 11th of May (a day to be had in everlasting remembrance) for the gratious deliverance from the strait Siege, London, 1646, and A Sermon preached on the 11th of May, 1652, in Taunton, upon the occasion of the Great Deliverance received upon that Day, London, 1652.

== Notes ==
Attribution

This article incorporates text from a publication now in the public domain: Lee, Sidney, ed. (1894). "Newton, George". Dictionary of National Biography. Vol. 40. London: Smith, Elder & Co.
