= Joseph Alleine =

English Nonconformist pastor and author (1634–1668)

Joseph Alleine (baptised 8 April 1634 – 17 November 1668) was an English Nonconformist pastor and author of many religious works.

== Life ==
Joseph Alleine's family had its root in Suffolk. Some descendants of Alan, Lord of Buckenhall settled in Wiltshire around Calne and Devizes as early as 1430. These were the immediate ancestors of "worthy Mr Tobie Alleine of Devizes", father of Joseph, who was the fourth of a large family, born at Devizes early in 1634. His elder brother Edward, who was a clergyman, died in 1645; and Joseph entreated his father that he might be educated to succeed his brother in the ministry.

In April 1649 he entered Lincoln College, Oxford, and on 3 November 1651 he became scholar of Corpus Christi College. On 6 July 1653, he took the degree of Bachelor of Divinity, and became a tutor and chaplain of Corpus Christi, preferring this to a fellowship. In 1654 he had offers of high preferment in the state, which he declined; but in 1655 George Newton of St Mary Magdalene, Taunton, sought him for assistant and Alleine accepted the invitation. Almost coincident with his ordination as associate pastor came his marriage with Theodosia Alleine, daughter of Richard Alleine. Theodosia was a cousin but it is not known how close a cousin. She was said to have been "bred to work" and she soon opened a boarding school at George Newton's house, which was said to have twenty and sometimes thirty boarders.

He found time to continue his studies, one part of which was his Theologia Philosophica (a lost manuscript), a learned attempt to harmonize revelation and nature, which was admired by Richard Baxter. He associated on equal terms with founders of the Royal Society. These scientific studies were, however, kept in subordination to his religious work.

After the Uniformity Act 1662 Alleine was among the ejected ministers. With a fellow nonconformist minister also ejected from his pulpit, John Westley (not to be confused with his more famous grandson, John Wesley, founder of Methodism), Alleine then travelled about preaching. For this he was put into prison, indicted at sessions, bullied and fined. His Letters from Prison were an earlier Cardiphonia than John Newton's.

In 1663 he was imprisoned and his wife stood by him during that year at Ilchester; he was released on 26 May 1664. In 1665 the Five Mile Act was passed, requiring expelled ministers to move at least five miles, and they moved to a house in an "obscure place" at Wellington, near Taunton. However they were still harassed and they stayed with friends and moved again to Taunton, Fullands. That house is said to be still extant and was the home of John Mallack. There they held another "secret" service, and Joseph was again arrested in July 1655.

His chief literary work was An Alarm to the Unconverted (1672), otherwise known as The Sure Guide to Heaven, which had an enormous circulation. His Remains appeared in 1674.

=== Death ===
Worn out by the continued persecution, he died in November 1668; and the mourners, remembering their beloved minister's words while yet with them, "If I should die fifty miles away, let me be buried at Taunton", found a grave for him in St Mary's chancel. His wife and others created An Account of the Life and Death of That Excellent Minister of Christ, the Rev. Joseph Alleine. Written by Richard Baxter, Theodosia Alleine, and Other Persons, to Which are Added His Christian Letters.

== Works ==
Joseph Alleine's Alarme went through numerous editions and abridgements across the seventeenth and eighteenth centuries; versions appeared in Welsh, Gaelic and German, and were published in Scotland and North America. It was also an important text to John Wesley, abridged and printed by him, and sold through Methodist catalogues and booksellers. Some of the most important editions are listed below, together with Alleine's other published works (mostly posthumous).

- A Call to Archippus, [London: s.n.], 1664
- An Alarme to Unconverted Sinners, London, 1672
- Divers Practical Cases of conscience, Satisfactorily Resolved, London, 1672
- A Most Familiar Explanation of the Assemblies Shorter Catechism, London, 1672
- Mr. Joseph Alleines Directions, for Covenanting vvith God, London, 1674
- Remaines, London, 1674
- The True Way to Happiness, London, 1675
- A Sure Guide to Heaven: or An Earnest Invitation to Sinners to Turn to God, London, 1688
- Hyfforddwr Cyfarwydd I'r Nefoedd, London, 1693
- Christian Letters Full of Spiritual Instructions, London, [1700?]
- Mr. Joseph Alleine's Rules for Self-Examination, Boston, [174-?]
- The Saint's Pocket-Book, Glasgow, 1742
- The Works of the Truly Pious and Learned Mr Joseph Allan, Edinburgh, 1752
- Useful Questions, Whereby a Person may Examine himself Every Day, Philadelphia, 1753
- The Shorter Catechism Agreed Upon by the Reverend Assembly of Divines at Westminster. To Which is Added, Some Serious Questions very Proper for True Christians to Ask Themselves Every Day, by the Late Reverend Mr.Joseph Allaine. Also a Cradle Hymn, by the Reverend Dr. Isaac Watts, New-London, 1754
- The Voice of God in His Promises, London, 1766
- The Believer's Triumph in God's Promises, London, 1767
- A Remedy of God's Own Providing for a Sinner's Guilty Conscience, [London?, 1770?]
- An Admonition to Unconverted Sinners, (London, 1771)
- Earail Dhùrachdach Do Pheacaich Neo-Iompaichte, Edinburgh, 1781
- An Abridgement of Alleine's Alarm to Unconverted Sinners, London, 1783
- Joseph Alleins Grundlegung zum thatigen Christenthum, Lancaster, 1797
- An Earnest Invitation to the Reader to Turn to God, Grantham, 1799

Books still in print by Joseph Alleine include:

- A Sure Guide To Heaven, ISBN 0-85151-081-7, ISBN 978-0-85151-081-1
- An Alarm to the Unconverted, ISBN 1-878442-21-X, ISBN 978-1-878442-21-5
