= Richard Alleine =

English clergyman (1610–1681)

Richard Alleine (16 October 1610 – 22 December 1681) was an English Puritan divine.

== Life ==
Alleine was born in 1610 at Ditcheat, Somerset to Richard Alleine Sr. (1585—1656) and there baptised on the 18 October 1610, where his father was rector. Alleine was an older brother of William Alleine, born 1614, the saintly vicar of Blandford. Richard was educated at St Alban Hall, Oxford, where he was entered commoner in 1627, and whence, having taken the degree of B.A., he transferred himself to New Inn, continuing there until he proceeded M.A. On being ordained he became assistant to his father, and immediately stirred the entire county by his burning eloquence. In 1634 he married Lettice Gough.

In March 1641 he succeeded the many-sided Richard Bernard as rector of Batcombe, Somerset. He declared himself on the side of the Puritans by subscribing "The testimony of the ministers in Somersetshire to the truth of Jesus Christ" and the Solemn League and Covenant. He assisted the commissioners of the parliament in their work of ejecting unsatisfactory ministers. Alleine continued for twenty years rector of Batcombe and was one of the two thousand ministers ejected in 1662. The Five Mile Act drove him to Frome Selwood, and in that neighborhood he preached until his death in 1681.

His works are all of a deeply spiritual character. His Vindiciae Pietatis (which first appeared in 1660) was refused license by Archbishop Sheldon, and was published, in common with other nonconformist books, without it. It was rapidly bought up and "did much to mend this bad world." Roger Norton, the king's printer, caused a large part of the first impression to be seized on the ground of its not being licensed and to be sent to the royal kitchen. Glancing over its pages, however, it seemed to him a sin that a book so holy and so salable should be destroyed. He therefore bought back the sheets, says the historian Edmund Calamy, for an old song, bound them and sold them in his own shop. This in turn was complained of, and he had to beg pardon on his knees before the council-table; and the remaining copies were sentenced to be " bisked," or rubbed over with an inky brush, and sent back to the kitchen for lighting fires. Such "bisked" copies occasionally occur still. The book was not killed. It was often reissued with additions, The Godly Man's Portion in 1663, Heaven Opened in 1666, The World Conquered in 1668. He also published a book of sermons. John Wesley credited him as the originator of the covenant prayer that he introduced into Methodism in 1755.

== Family ==
On 14 October 1634, Alleine married Miss Lettice Gough (b. 1611); the wedding was carried out by his father.

Their daughter Theodosia was born circa 1635. She married her cousin (to some degree), the ejected minister Joseph Alleine. She was said to have been "bred for work".

== Works ==
- A Brief Explanation of the Common Catechisme Distinguished into Three Parts, London, 1630
- Vindiciæ Pietatis, London, 1660
- Cheirothesia Tou Presbyteriou, or A Letter to a Friend, London, 1661
- The Godly Mans Portion and Sanctuary, London, [1662?]
- Heaven Opened, or, A Brief and Plain Discovery of the Riches of Gods Covenant by Grace, London, 1665
- The Best of Remedies for the Worst of Maladies, London, 1667
- The World Conquered, or A Believer's Victory Over the World, London, 1668
- Two Prayers: One for the Use of Families, the Other for Children, [ca. 1670]
- Godly-Fear, or, The Nature and Necessity of Fear, and its Usefulness, London, 1674
- A Rebuke to Backsliders, and a Spurr for Loyterers, London, 1677
- A Murderer Punished and Pardoned or, A True Relation of the Wicked Life, and Shameful-Happy Death of Thomas Savage, London, 1679
- A Companion for Prayer, London, 1680
- Instructions About Heart-Work, London, 1681
- The Christian's Daily Practice of Piety, Edinburgh, 1703
- The Voice of God to Christless Unregenerate Sinners, Boston, 1743
