= Church of St Mary the Virgin, Batcombe =

Church in Somerset, England

Church of St Mary the Virgin
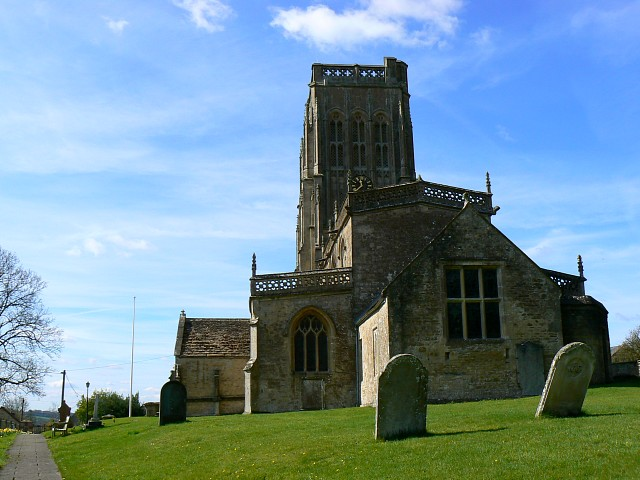

- Location within Somerset

General information
- Location: Batcombe, Somerset, England
- Coordinates: 51.1497°N 2.4444°W
- Construction started: 15th century
- Completed: 16th century

The Church of St Mary the Virgin is an Anglican church in Batcombe, Somerset, England. Dating from the 15th and 16th centuries, it was restored in the 19th century and has since been designated by English Heritage as a Grade I listed building. The parish is part of the deanery of Bruton and Cary within the Wells Archdeanery.

The church is built of limestone from the Doulting Stone Quarry. The tower, which has triple belfry openings, contains six bells dating from 1760 and made by Thomas Bilbie, of the Bilbie family, in Cullompton. The interior of the church includes an octagonal font. The stained glass windows include one at the eastern end of the south aisle by Heaton, Butler and Bayne which was installed around 1896 and the east window from 1930 by Archibald Keightley Nicholson. The churchyard contains the war grave of a Royal Navy sailor of World War I.

== See also ==
- List of Grade I listed buildings in Mendip
- List of towers in Somerset
- List of ecclesiastical parishes in the Diocese of Bath and Wells
