= St John the Evangelist, Taunton =

Church in Somerset, England

Coordinates: 51.0136°N 3.1086°W

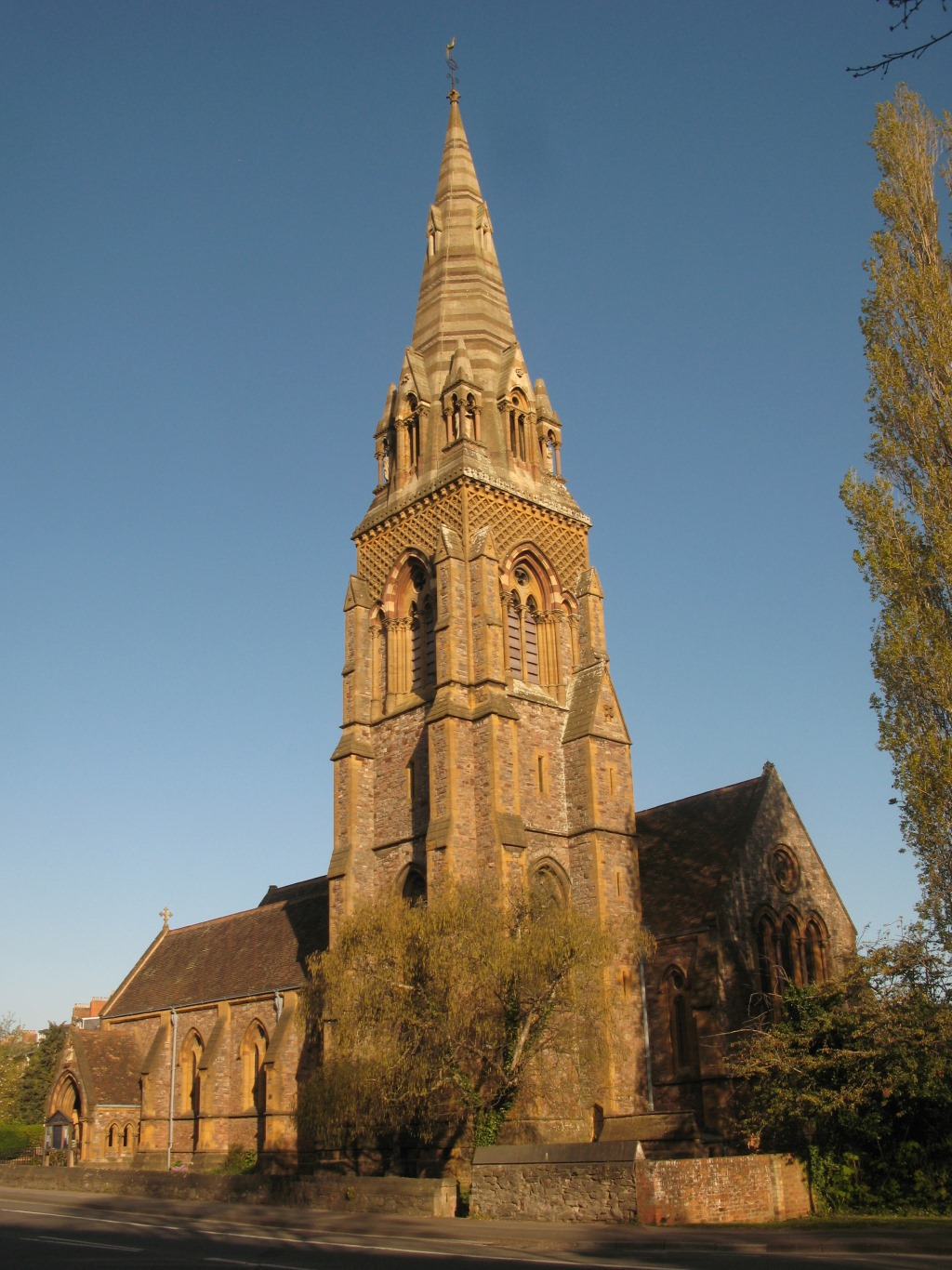
St John's Church, Taunton

The Church of St John the Evangelist, Taunton is a Church of England parish church in Taunton, Somerset. It is a grade I listed building.

== History ==
The Reverend Frederick Jeremiah Smith decided to build a new church in Taunton for the poor of the town. From 1858 to 1863, St John's was built under the guidance of the eminent Victorian architect George Gilbert Scott. Materials used included a variety of Somerset stones, including Hamstone, Bath stone and sandstone from Bishops Lydeard. As the church was to be used by the poor, it did not charge pew rents: it was therefore the first Anglican church in Taunton to be free and accessible to all worshippers. The church was consecrated on 13 April 1863.

A "Father" Henry Willis organ was installed in 1864. Albert Ham was organist and choirmaster at the church from 1892 to 1897.

=== Present day ===
The Church of St John the Evangelist is now part of a combined benefice with St Mary Magdalene, Taunton. It is within the Archdeaconry of Taunton in the Diocese of Bath and Wells.

The church was founded in the Anglo-Catholic tradition. In the 21st-century, it is an Inclusive Catholic church.
