= Five Mile Act 1665 =

Act of the Parliament of England

Nonconformists Act 1665
- Act of Parliament
- Parliament of England
- Long title: An Act for restraining Non-Conformists from inhabiting in Corporations.
- Citation: 17 Cha. 2. c. 2
- Territorial extent: England and Wales

Dates
- Royal assent: 31 October 1665
- Commencement: 9 October 1665 (Note: Start of session.)
- Repealed: 29 July 1812
Other legislation
Repealed by	Places of Religious Worship Act 1812
Relates to	Conventicle Act 1664; Toleration Act 1688

Status: Repealed

Text of statute as originally enacted

The Five Mile Act, or Oxford Act, or Nonconformists Act 1665 (17 Cha. 2. c. 2), was an act of the Parliament of England, passed in 1665 with the long title "An Act for restraining Non-Conformists from inhabiting in Corporations". It was one of the English penal laws that sought to enforce conformity to the established Church of England, and to expel any who did not conform. It forbade clergymen from living, visiting or preaching within five miles (8 km) of a parish from which they had been expelled, or to come within five miles of any city, town or borough that sends Members to Parliament unless they swore an oath never to resist the king, or attempt to alter the government of Church or State. The latter involved swearing to obey the 1662 prayer book. Thousands of ministers were deprived of a living under the act.

As an example, Theodosia Alleine and her husband Joseph Alleine were obliged to move to Taunton after her husband's conviction as a non-conformist. They moved, but they were still harassed and had to move and live with friends to escape their critics.

== Subsequent developments ==
The whole act was repealed by section 1 of the Places of Religious Worship Act 1812 (52 Geo. 3. c. 155), which came into force on 29 July 1812.

== See also ==
- Conventicle Act 1664
- Religion in the United Kingdom
- Declaration of Indulgence (disambiguation)

== Bibliography ==
- Hutton, Ronald (1989). Charles II, King of England, Scotland, and Ireland. Oxford: Clarendon Press. pp. 228–229. ISBN 0-19-822911-9.
