= Batcombe, Somerset =

Village and civil parish in Somerset, England

Coordinates: 51.1538°N 2.4354°W

Batcombe
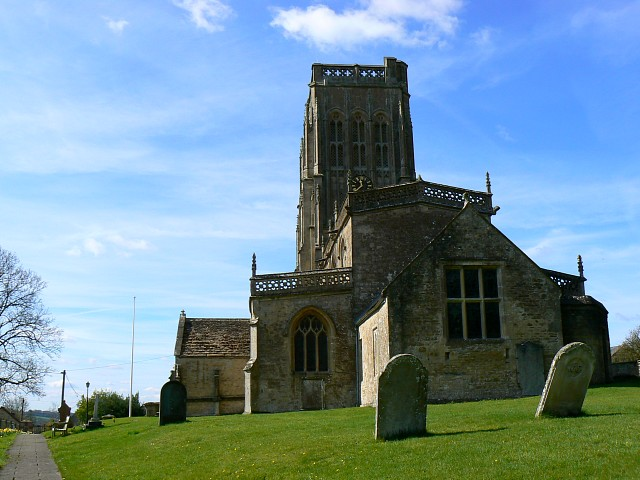
- Church of St Mary the Virgin, Batcombe

- Location within Somerset
- Population: 439 (2011)
- OS grid reference: ST695395
- Unitary authority: Somerset Council
- Ceremonial county: Somerset
- Region: South West
- Country: England
- Sovereign state: United Kingdom
- Post town: SHEPTON MALLET
- Postcode district: BA4
- Dialling code: 01749
- Police: Avon and Somerset
- Fire: Devon and Somerset
- Ambulance: South Western
- UK Parliament: Frome and East Somerset

Batcombe is a village and civil parish in Somerset, England, situated in the steep valley of the River Alham 5 miles (8 km) south-east of Shepton Mallet and 26 miles (42 km) south of Bristol. The parish has a population of 439. Batcombe village is at the heart of the parish, which also includes the hamlets of Westcombe, Spargrove and Eastcombe (historically Ashcombe).

== History ==
The name Batcombe comes from Saxon and means "Bat's Valley".

Around 2 miles (3 km) from Batcombe village is an Iron Age hill fort on Smalldown Knoll which dates back to the Iron Age and possibly the Bronze Age.

Batcombe is thought to have been established around 660 CE following the Saxon invasion of Great Britain. Both settlements are recorded in the Domesday Book written after the Norman Conquest of England in 1066. The parish of Batcombe was part of the Whitstone Hundred.

The Mendip district was, for several centuries, highly dependent on the wool industry, with which these villages were linked.

Westcombe was for many years property of Glastonbury Abbey which was destroyed with the Dissolution of the Monasteries. The hamlet and area as a whole had strong links with the English woolen industry, which gave name to settlements such as Milton Clevedon.

For a long time the Bisse family owned much property in Batcombe, as well as other local villages, including Spargrove.

The Church of St Mary the Virgin dates from the 15th and 16th centuries and was restored in the 19th. The tower contains six bells dating from 1760 and made by Thomas Bilbie, of the Bilbie family, in Cullompton. It has been designated by English Heritage as a Grade I listed building.

In the 1643 the people of Batcombe got into a fight with the people of Bruton.

Batcombe has a war memorial dedicated to those who gave their lives in World War I. The war memorial in Westcombe has engraved on it around 12 names. It was originally a family memorial to Henry Ernst in 1913, but it was later converted to a war memorial in 1919.

In 1933 Batcombe village hall was built next to the village school. The hall was constructed largely of timber and built by local villagers. By the 1990s the hall's age was beginning to show, and it was clearly rotting. In 2001 the hall was demolished, mainly by local people. Once the site had been cleared (most of the wood being recycled) the foundations were laid for the new hall. The "Batcombe Jubilee Hall" was completed in May 2002, and officially opened by HRH Prince Charles on 25 May 2002. The Jubilee Hall is mainly of stone construction, with two sides made of external timber. In all the project cost over £500,000. The hall is run by the Batcombe Village Hall Trust, a charitable organisation of volunteers.

The property in Westcombe was historically owned by a single family, the Ernst family who lived in the Georgian country house of Westcombe House. Most of the estate was sold in 1927, and divided between two daughters. One inherited Westcombe House and the other all the family's wealth. The house fell into disrepair, and was demolished in the early 1950s. Today the hamlet is home to a small industrial site owned mainly by Milton-Westcombe Farms Limited. The largest business operation on site is that of Westcombe Cheese, which produces handmade cheeses sold across the UK.

== Governance ==
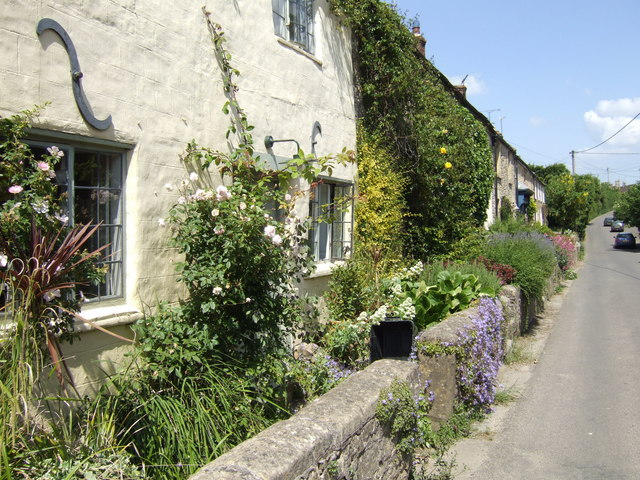
Cottages in Batcombe

The parish council has responsibility for local issues, including setting an annual precept (local rate) to cover the council's operating costs and producing annual accounts for public scrutiny. The parish council evaluates local planning applications and works with the local police, district council officers, and neighbourhood watch groups on matters of crime, security, and traffic. The parish council's role also includes initiating projects for the maintenance and repair of parish facilities, as well as consulting with the district council on the maintenance, repair, and improvement of highways, drainage, footpaths, public transport, and street cleaning. Conservation matters (including trees and listed buildings) and environmental issues are also the responsibility of the council.

For local government purposes, since 1 April 2023, the parish comes under the unitary authority of Somerset Council. Prior to this, it was part of the non-metropolitan district of Mendip (established under the Local Government Act 1972). It was part of Shepton Mallet Rural District before 1974.

It is also part of the Frome and East Somerset county constituency represented in the House of Commons of the Parliament of the United Kingdom. It elects one Member of Parliament (MP) by the first past the post system of election.

== Notable people ==
- Henry Albin (1624–1696) – minister. This article incorporates text from a publication now in the public domain: "Albin, Henry". Dictionary of National Biography. London: Smith, Elder & Co. 1885–1900.
- Richard Alleine (1610–1681) – Puritan minister.
- Richard Bernard (1568–1641) – Puritan minister.
- Philip Bisse (1540–1613) – Puritan Minister, Archdeacon of Taunton, gave nearly 3000 books to found the library at Wadham College, Oxford.
