= Worshipful Company of Armourers and Brasiers =

Livery company of the City of London

Coordinates: 51.51720°N 0.08948°W

Arms of the Worshipful Company of Armourers and Brasiers.

The Worshipful Company of Armourers and Brasiers is one of the livery companies of the City of London. The Armourers' Guild was established in 1322; it received a royal charter in 1453. Other companies, including the Armour Repairers, merged with the Armourers. In 1708, brass workers joined the company, which was renamed as the Armourers' and Brasiers' Company. The company does support the metallurgy industry, but does not retain a close association with its original trade, as is the case with a majority of livery companies. It exists primarily as a charitable establishment.

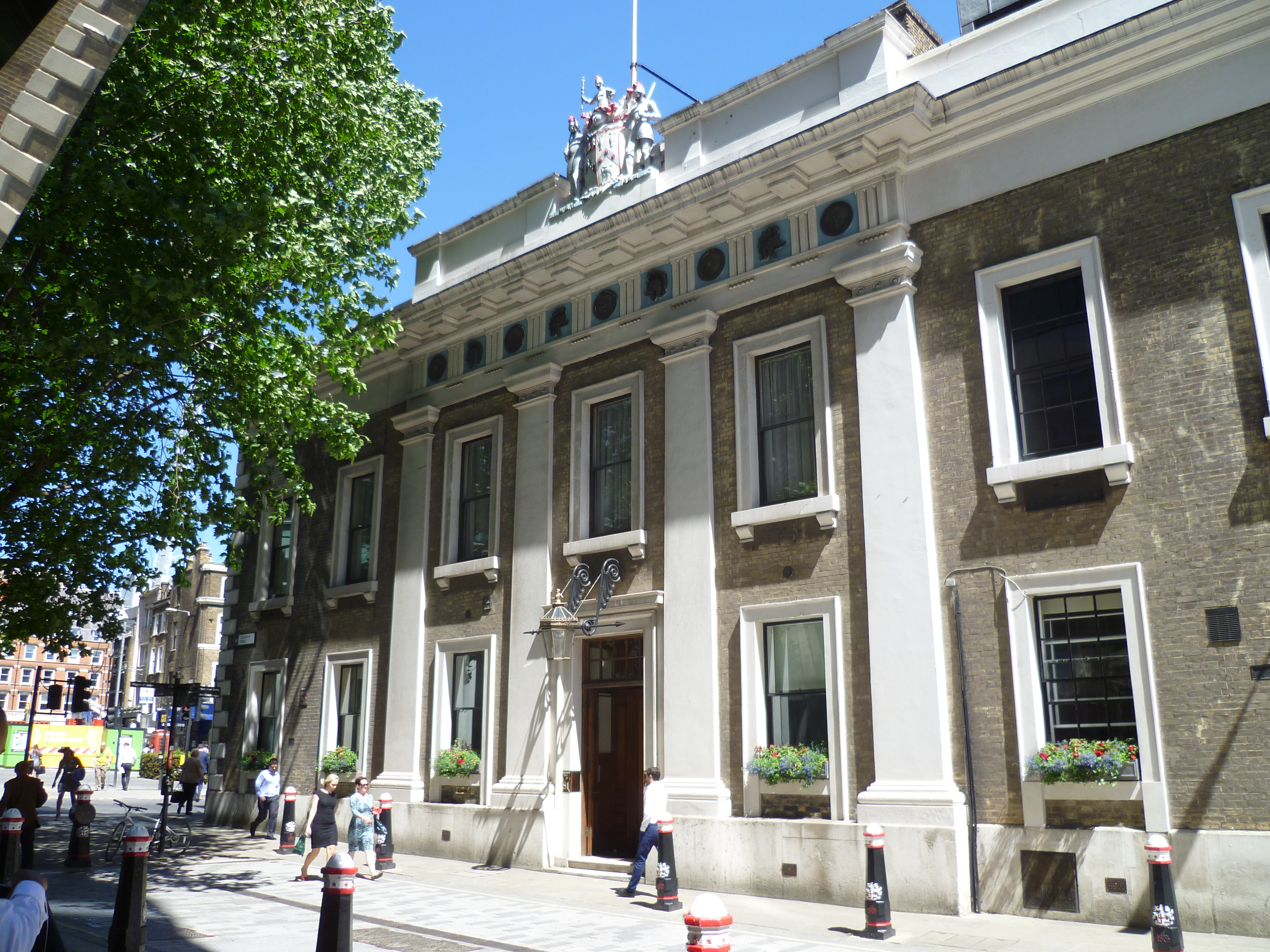
Armourers' Hall, London.

The company is based at Armourers' Hall, situated on the corner of Coleman Street and London Wall, and has occupied this same site since 1346. The hall was one of the very few to escape destruction in the Great Fire of London in 1666. In 1795, the hall was enlarged, but it was decided in 1839 to rebuild it completely. The lantern, or dome, of the livery hall was added in 1872. On 29 December 1940, during a major blitz on London, the surrounding area was devastated, but again the hall survived.

The Armourers' and Brasiers' Company ranks twenty-second in the order of precedence of livery companies. The company's motto is We Are One.
