= Declaration of Indulgence =

Declaration of Indulgence may refer to:

- Declaration of Indulgence (1672) by Charles II of England in favour of nonconformists and Catholics
- Declaration of Indulgence (1687) by James II of England granting religious freedom

== See also ==
- Indulgence
