= Taunton Minster =

Taunton Minster (St Mary Magdalene church)
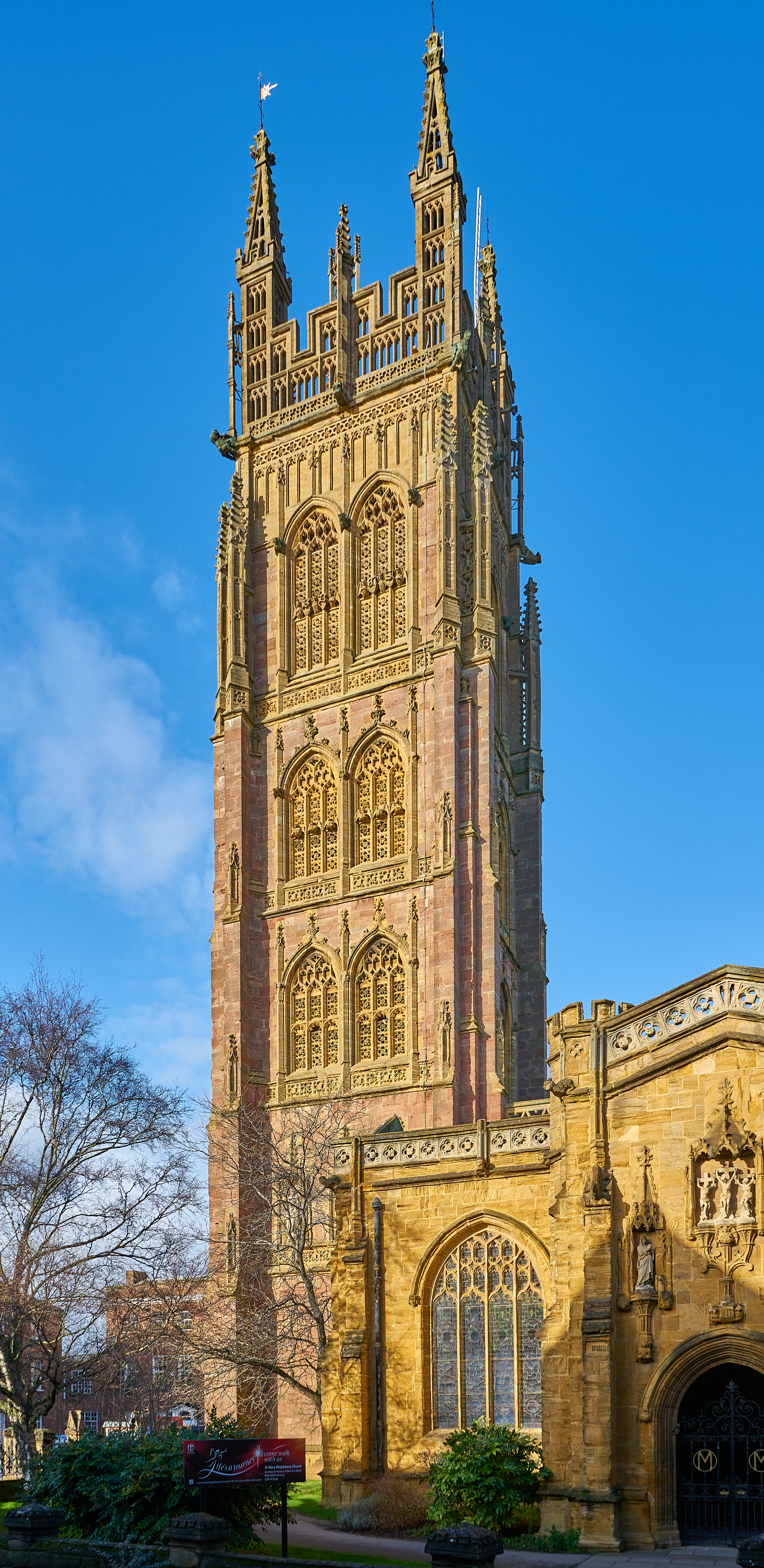
- Taunton Minster (St Mary Magdalene church)
- 51°00′56″N 3°06′03″W
- Location: Taunton
- Country: England
- Denomination: Church of England
- Churchmanship: Central
- Website: www.tauntonminster.org

History
- Status: Parish church
- Dedication: St Mary Magdalene

Architecture
- Functional status: Active
- Heritage designation: Grade I listed
- Style: Early Tudor Perpendicular Gothic style
- Completed: 1508

Specifications
- Height: 158 ft (48 m) (tower)

Administration
- Province: Canterbury
- Diocese: Bath and Wells
- Archdeaconry: Taunton
- Deanery: Taunton
- Benefice: Taunton (St Mary Magdalene) (St John the Evangelist)

Clergy
- Vicar: In Vacancy

Taunton Minster (St Mary Magdalene church) is a Church of England parish minster church in Taunton, Somerset, England, dedicated to Jesus' companion Mary Magdalene. It was completed in 1508 and is in the Early Tudor Perpendicular Gothic style. It is designated as a Grade I listed building. It is notable for its very tall tower.

== History and description ==
St Mary's church was probably established as part of the reorganisation of Taunton by Henry of Blois, Bishop of Winchester, by 1180, and has been the town church since 1308. Prior to 1308 the church was dependent on the Augustinian Taunton Priory. A new chapel was consecrated in 1437.

It is built of sandstone and has a painted interior. Most of the statues and stained glass date from the Victorian restoration. Within the church are a variety of memorials and tablets including War Memorials for soldiers from Somerset, including the Somerset Light Infantry.

The tower was built around 1503, financed by the prosperity created by the wool trade, and was rebuilt in 1858–1862 (in replica) by Sir George Gilbert Scott and Benjamin Ferrey, using Otter sandstone from Sir Alexander Hood's quarry at Williton and some Igneous Diorite from Hestercombe. It is considered to be one of the best examples of a Somerset tower and is a local landmark. The tower is 131 feet (40 metres) high to the roof and 158 feet (48 metres) high to the tips of the pinnacles.

The tower was described by Simon Jenkins, an acknowledged authority on English churches, as being "the noblest parish tower in England". The tower itself has 15 bells and a clock mechanism.

12 are hung for full-circle ringing, tenor 27 long cwt 2 qr 18 lb (3,098 lb or 1,405 kg) tuned to D. In addition there is a "flat 6th" which allows bells 2–9 to be rung as a lighter 8. The ringing bells, along with two additional bells form a chime, also (though technically incorrectly) referred to as a carillon. The present ring of bells were cast by Taylors of Loughborough in 2016. There is also an older display bell cast by the Whitechapel Bell Foundry in 1922.

The church has suffered from the weather over the years and there have been various appeals for funding to repair the fabric of the building including one for £135,000, to repair the tower's stonework after two pinnacles fell through the roof. In 2009 vandals damaged some of the windows of the church, however the stained glass, which includes fragments from the medieval era were undamaged as they are protected by wire mesh.

Joseph Alleine, a Puritan minister and author, was curate of the church in the 1660s and is buried in the churchyard. John Boswell, a Tory and high church writer, served as vicar at the church from 1727 until his death in 1757. He is buried in the churchyard and is commemorated with a Latin inscription within the church.

== Present day ==
Taunton Minster (St Mary Magdalene church) is now part of a combined benefice with the Church of St John the Evangelist, Taunton. It is within the Archdeaconry of Taunton in the Diocese of Bath and Wells.

The church was previously of a low church and evangelical tradition, but it has moved towards a central churchmanship in recent times.

At a special service on Sunday 13 March 2022, St Mary Magdalene church became Taunton Minster.

== See also ==
- List of Grade I listed buildings in Taunton Deane
- List of towers in Somerset
- List of ecclesiastical parishes in the Diocese of Bath and Wells
