= Nalton =

Nalton may refer to:

- James Nalton (1600?–1662), English Presbyterian minister
- Nalton Womersley (1859–1930), British tennis player

== See also ==
- Naltona, village in Bangladesh
