= John Collins (Independent minister) =

English Independent minister

John Collins (c. 1632–1687) was an English Independent minister.

== Biography ==
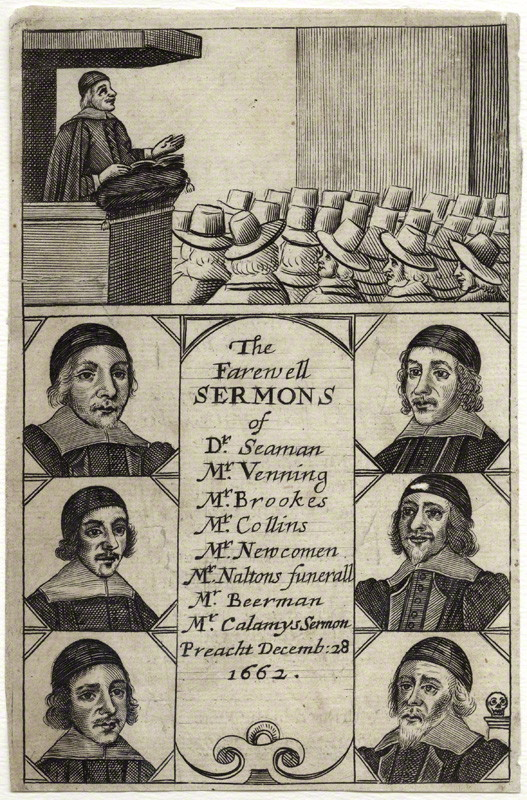
Farewell Sermons (1663), title page; besides one from John Collins, this work contained sermons by William Be(e)rman, Thomas Brooks, Edmund Calamy the Elder, Matthew Newcomen, Lazarus Seaman, and Ralph Venning, as well as a funeral sermon for James Nalton

John Collins was born in England, but brought up in New England, where his father Edward became a deacon of the congregational church at Cambridge, Massachusetts. He graduated from Harvard College in 1649, and became a fellow there. In 1653 he returned to Britain, as a preacher in Scotland.

In 1659 Collins was acting as chaplain to General George Monck, whom he accompanied from Scotland to London. Monk dismissed his Independent chaplains in March 1660, when he turned to the Presbyterians. Collins held no preferment at the date of the Uniformity Act 1662, but is included by Edmund Calamy among the "silenced ministers."

Subsequently, he succeeded Thomas Mallory (ejected from the lectureship of St. Michael's, Crooked Lane) as pastor of a congregational church in Lime Street, London. He was also one of the Pinners' Hall lecturers. He died on 3 December 1687.

== Works ==
According to Calamy, Collins published no separate work, but:

- furnished a sermon to the London Farewell Sermons (1663), 8vo;
- and another (anonymous) to the third volume (1676) of Morning Exercise at Cripplegate, edited by Samuel Annesley, D.D.
- In conjunction with James Baron, B.D., he wrote a prefatory epistle to Ralph Venning's Remains, or Christ's School, etc. (1675), 8vo;
- he also wrote an epistle prefixed to a Discourse of the Glory to which God hath called Believers (1677), 12mo, by Jonathan Mitchel, a New England divine.

== Family ==
Collins's son Thomas (educated at Utrecht) was elected copastor at Lime Street in 1697.
