= King Edward's School, Birmingham =

Independent day school in Birmingham, England

King Edward's School Birmingham

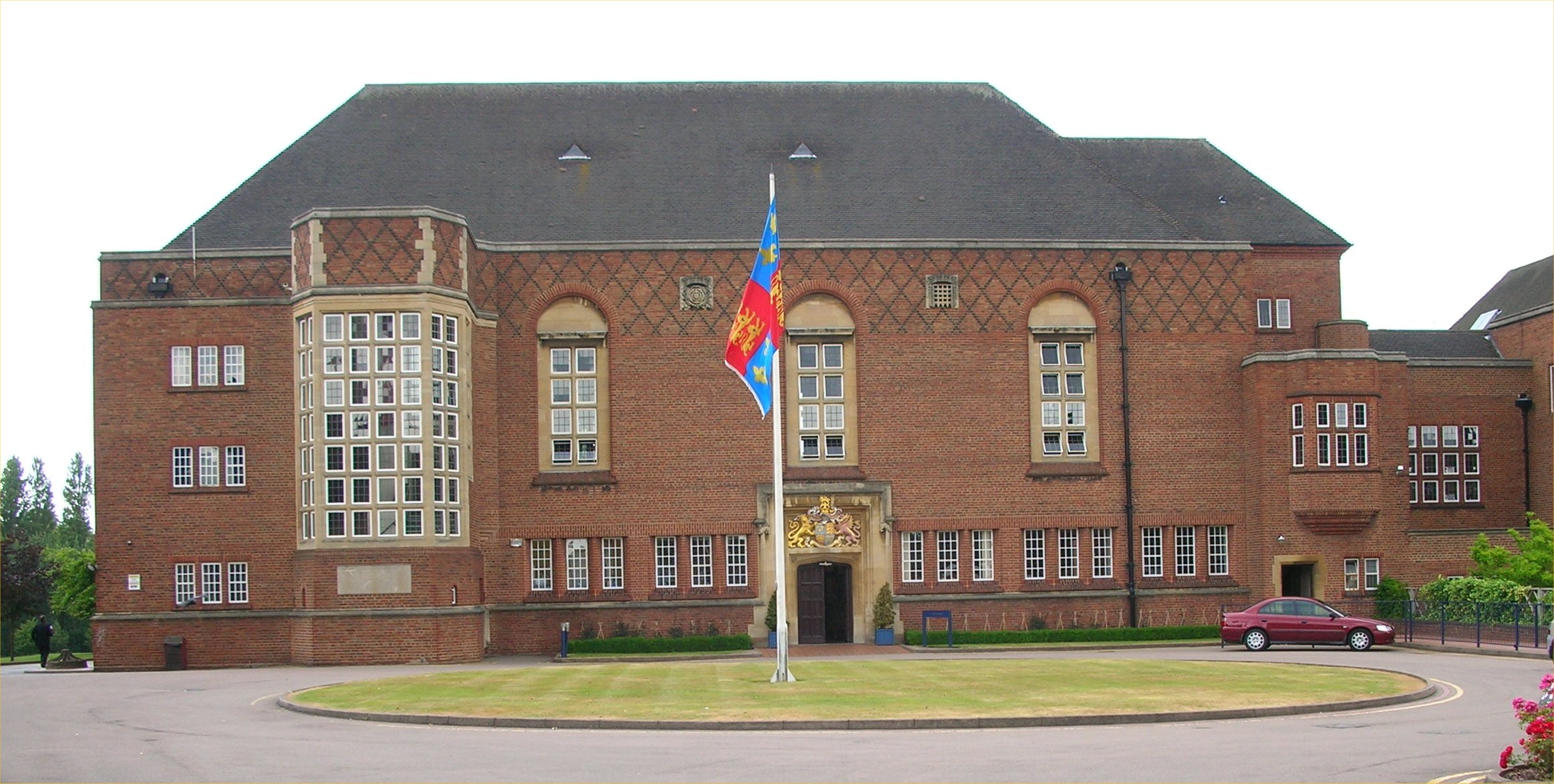

Location
- Edgbaston Park Road; Birmingham, West Midlands, B15 2UA; England; 52.4507°N 1.9237°W

Information
- Type: Public School; Private day school
- Motto: Domine salvum fac regem (God save the King)
- Established: 1552; 474 years ago
- Founder: King Edward VI
- Department for Education URN: 103584 Tables
- Chief Master & Principal: Kirsty von Malaisé
- Staff: 70 (approx.)
- Gender: Boys
- Age: 11 to 18
- Enrolment: 825 pupils
- Houses: 8
- Colour
- Former pupils: Old Edwardians (OEs)
- Affiliation: HMC
- Website: kes.org.uk

King Edward's School (KES) is an independent day school for boys in the British public school tradition, located in Edgbaston, Birmingham. Founded by King Edward VI in 1552, it is part of the Foundation of the Schools of King Edward VI. It is a member of the Headmasters' and Headmistresses' Conference.

It shares its site and is twinned with King Edward VI High School for Girls (KEHS). While the two schools run separately, dramatic arts, societies, music and other events are often shared; the schools also share a couple of hockey pitches and several clubs. The shared area is called Winterbourne after the nearby Winterbourne Botanic Garden. Since September 2024, the two schools have shared a joint head teacher, styled Chief Master & Principal.

Alumni of the school include two Nobel laureates, a Fields medallist, as well as J. R. R. Tolkien (author of The Lord of the Rings), and Field Marshal William Slim, 1st Viscount Slim, British military commander in Burma during the Second World War.

== History ==
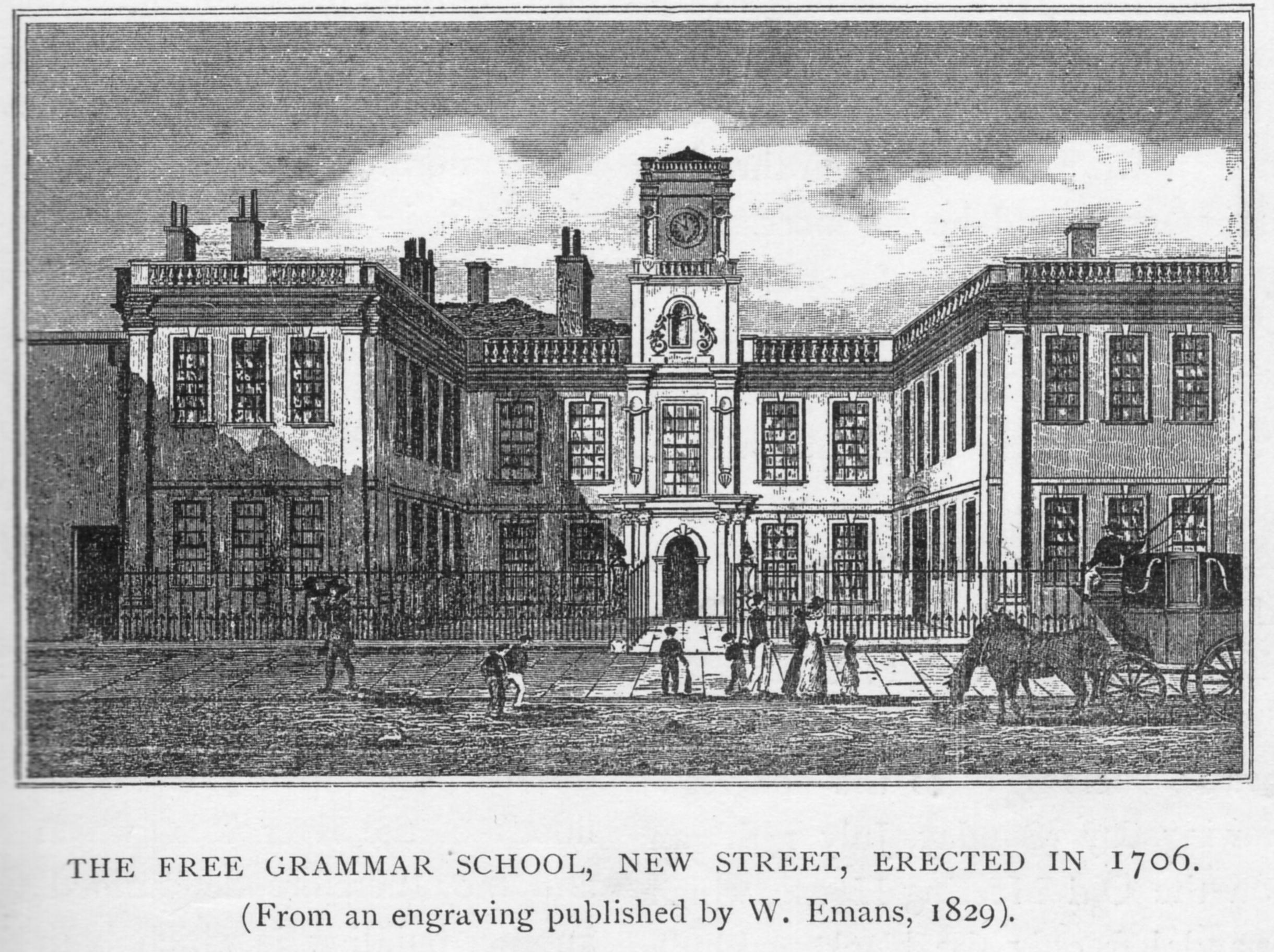
The school buildings on the New Street site, 1731–1834

=== Origins and New Street site ===
King Edward VI Grammar School Birmingham Act 1842
- Act of Parliament
- Parliament of the United Kingdom
- Long title: An Act to extend the Provisions of Two Acts, of the Second Year of King William the Fourth and the First Year of Her present Majesty, relating to the Free Grammar School of King Edward the Sixth in Birmingham in the County of Warwick.
- Citation: 5 & 6 Vict. c. 35 Pr.

Dates
- Royal assent: 30 July 1842
Other legislation
Amends	King Edward VI's Free Grammar School Act 1831; King Edward VI Free Grammar School Birmingham Act 1837
Repealed by	Birmingham (King Edward the Sixth) School Act 1900

Status: Repealed

Text of statute as originally enacted

The School was formed by the Gild of the Holy Cross and received the royal charter of King Edward VI on 2 January 1552 together with £20 per annum returned by the Crown for educational purposes. Five years earlier, in 1547, the Suppression of Religious Houses Act 1535, part of the wider Dissolution of the Monasteries, provided for the confiscation of all assets of religious guilds except an amount of land with an annual income of £21 (two thirds of the original lands) if the guild supported a school. The Guild of the Holy Cross in Birmingham had no school, but persuaded the Earl of Northumberland (also the lord of the manor of Birmingham) to release the land for the creation of a school. The charter of the "free Grammer Schole" of King Edward VI was issued on 2 January 1552, and the school came into being in the former guild building on New Street. By the 1680s there were "neer 200" boys in the school and a Petty School (a feeder school) had been established by the foundation.

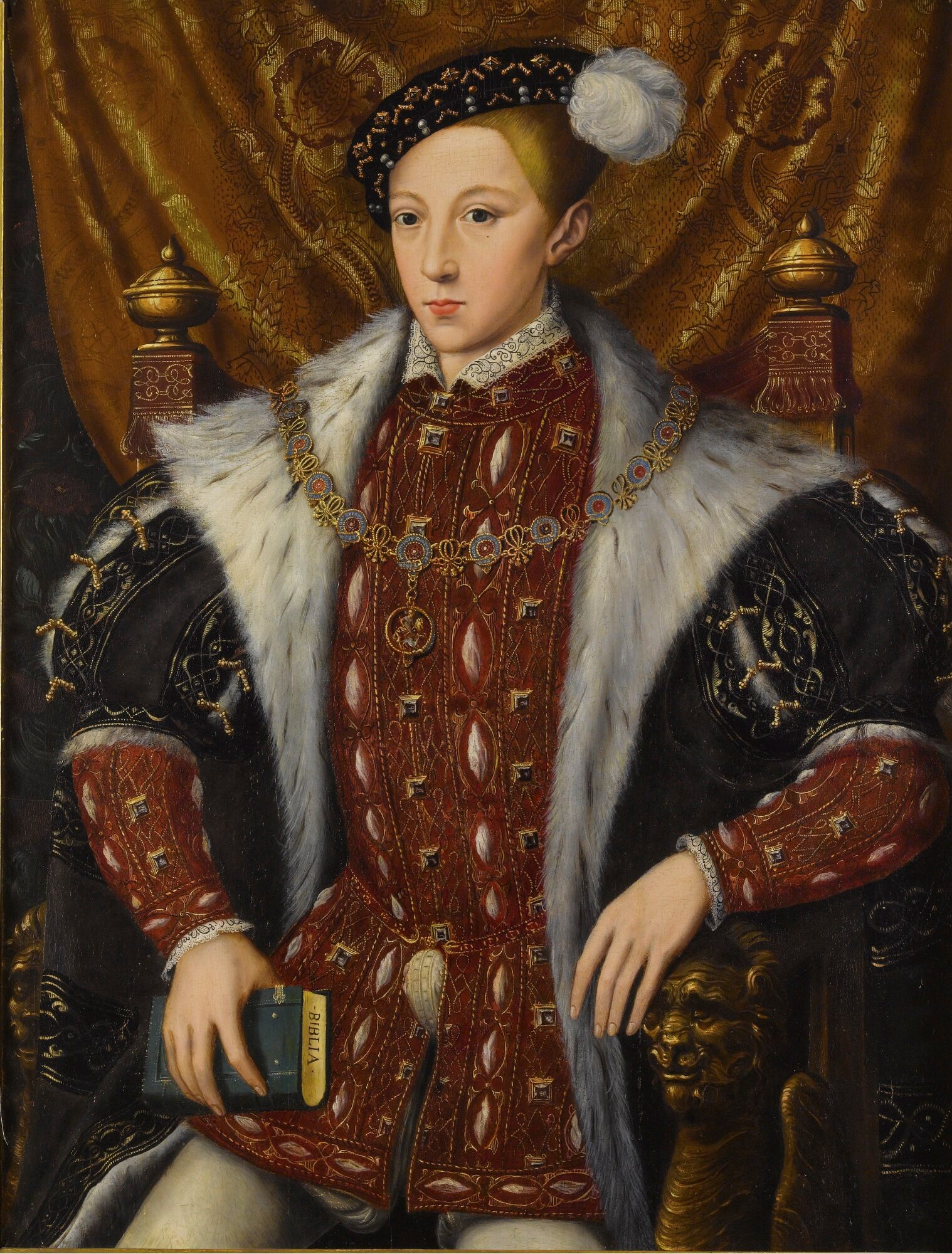
The School was founded by King Edward VI in 1552.

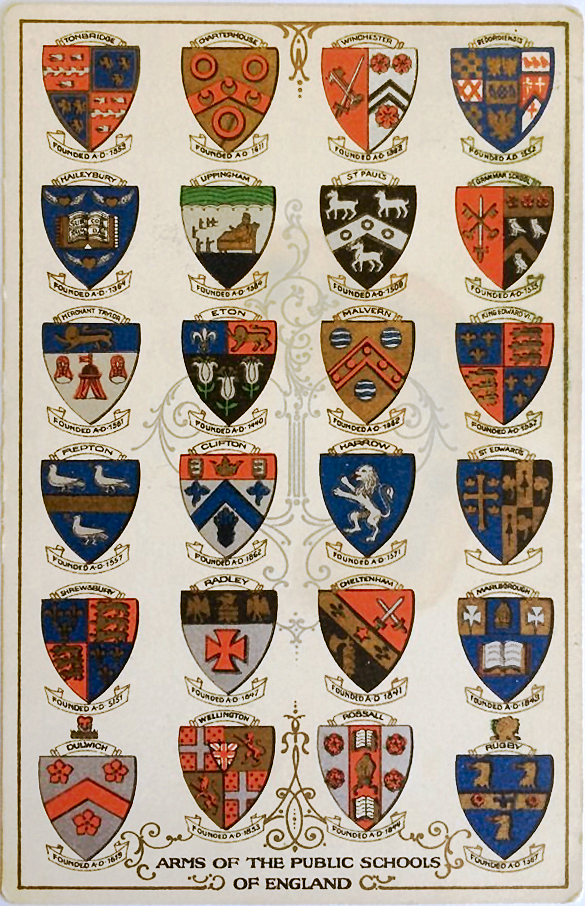
A postcard from 1911 shows the Arms of the 24 leading schools of England; the Arms of King Edward's School are shown in the third row. Unlike many other independent schools in the British public school tradition, King Edward's is not a boarding school.

The affairs of the school in the early part of the 18th century were dominated by a quarrel between a governor and the headmaster, but this notwithstanding, a new Georgian-inspired building was built on the New Street site between 1731 and 1734. In the latter part of the 18th century four separate elementary schools and a girls' school were set up by the Foundation of the Schools of King Edward VI. The school remained relatively stagnant after this until Francis Jeune was appointed Headmaster in 1835. He erected a new building on the same site, in the Gothic Revival style of architecture. This was designed by Charles Barry, who employed Augustus Welby Northmore Pugin for aspects of the interior design, generally held to include Big School and, less certainly, the decorative battlements. (Barry, again employing Pugin, subsequently designed the present Palace of Westminster.) From within this new landmark building came several changes in the curriculum and ethos of the school. Sports became an important feature, through games afternoons, and the dominance of Classics was lessened by the introduction of mathematics and science.

=== Edgbaston site and Second World War ===
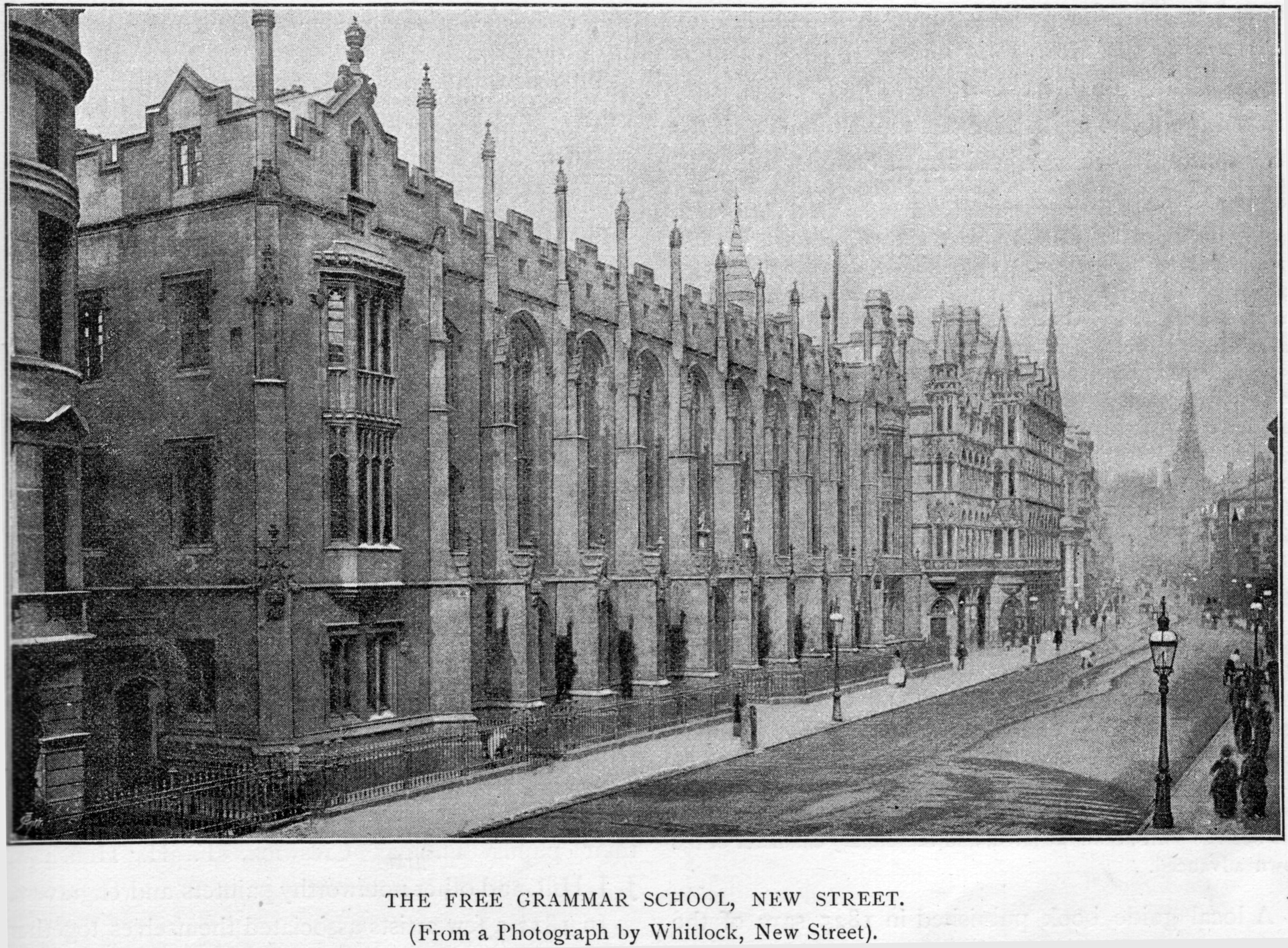
Charles Barry's New Street school, 1835–1936

By 1936 the old building on New Street had become a fire risk, and soot from the nearby train station was also an issue. The school also did not have any nearby space for sports, and had to travel to the playing fields near the present-day school. As a result, plans were made by the Governors and the then Headmaster, Edwin Thirlwall England, to move to a new site at Edgbaston Park Road/Bristol Road, in Edgbaston, along with the girls' school. At the time this new site was in the countryside, along with the nearby university.

Ironically, the temporary buildings erected on South Field of the new site in 1936 burnt down. The school was forced to move for a time to the University of Birmingham's Great Hall and surrounding buildings until new temporary buildings could be erected. The move was complicated by the outbreak of the Second World War, and the subsequent evacuation of the pupils to Repton School for a short period.

October 1939 saw the requisition by the War Office of the temporary buildings and surrounding playing fields, and they were used by the British and US armies for the remainder of the war. This use included, from February 1945, the basing of the 6888th Central Postal Directory Battalion: the only all-female, all-Black US Army unit to be deployed overseas during the war. The 855 women of the battalion were sent to Birmingham to sort and redirect a huge backlog of mail for US service personnel in Europe. The women of '6888' (Six Triple Eight) lived and worked at King Edward's for 3 months to sort and despatch over 17 million items of mail, processing approximately 65,000 pieces of mail per shift at a rate of 3 shifts per day. In May 2019, US Ambassador Woody Johnson presented a blue plaque to the school to commemorate the 6888th's achievement; the plaque now features on the route of guided tours organised by the Black Heritage Walks Network. The temporary buildings were later converted into classrooms before being demolished in 1958.

=== Expansion and recent history ===
By 1940 enough of the new buildings designed by Holland W. Hobbiss had been built for the school to begin lessons. In 1945 the schools became direct grant grammar schools, which meant that the Governors had to relinquish some control over the running of the school.

The schools were finally completed around 1948, although the 1950s saw a period of expansion under the Chief Master Ronald G. Lunt, appointed 1952, including the construction of a swimming pool and the building of a chapel from a specially salvaged portion of the upper corridor of the New Street building. In 1976 the two schools became, once again, independent schools, due to the termination of the Direct Grant scheme by the then Prime Minister Harold Wilson. The school remains independent and is still on the Edgbaston site.

In 2010 the school replaced A levels with the International Baccalaureate diploma. This decision was reversed in 2025: from September of that year, all new Year 12 students were studying A Levels.

In 2012, the Independent review of A-level and IB results, based on government-issued statistics, ranked King Edward's School 9th in the UK, ahead of Westminster (17th), St Paul's (22nd), Harrow (34th), Winchester (73rd) and Eton (80th).

King Edward's School and King Edward's High School for Girls are managed by the Independent Schools Governing Body. Since September 2024 the schools have been led by a combined leadership team led by Kirsty Von Malaisé as Principal of KEHS and Chief Master of KES.

== School buildings ==
=== The chapel ===
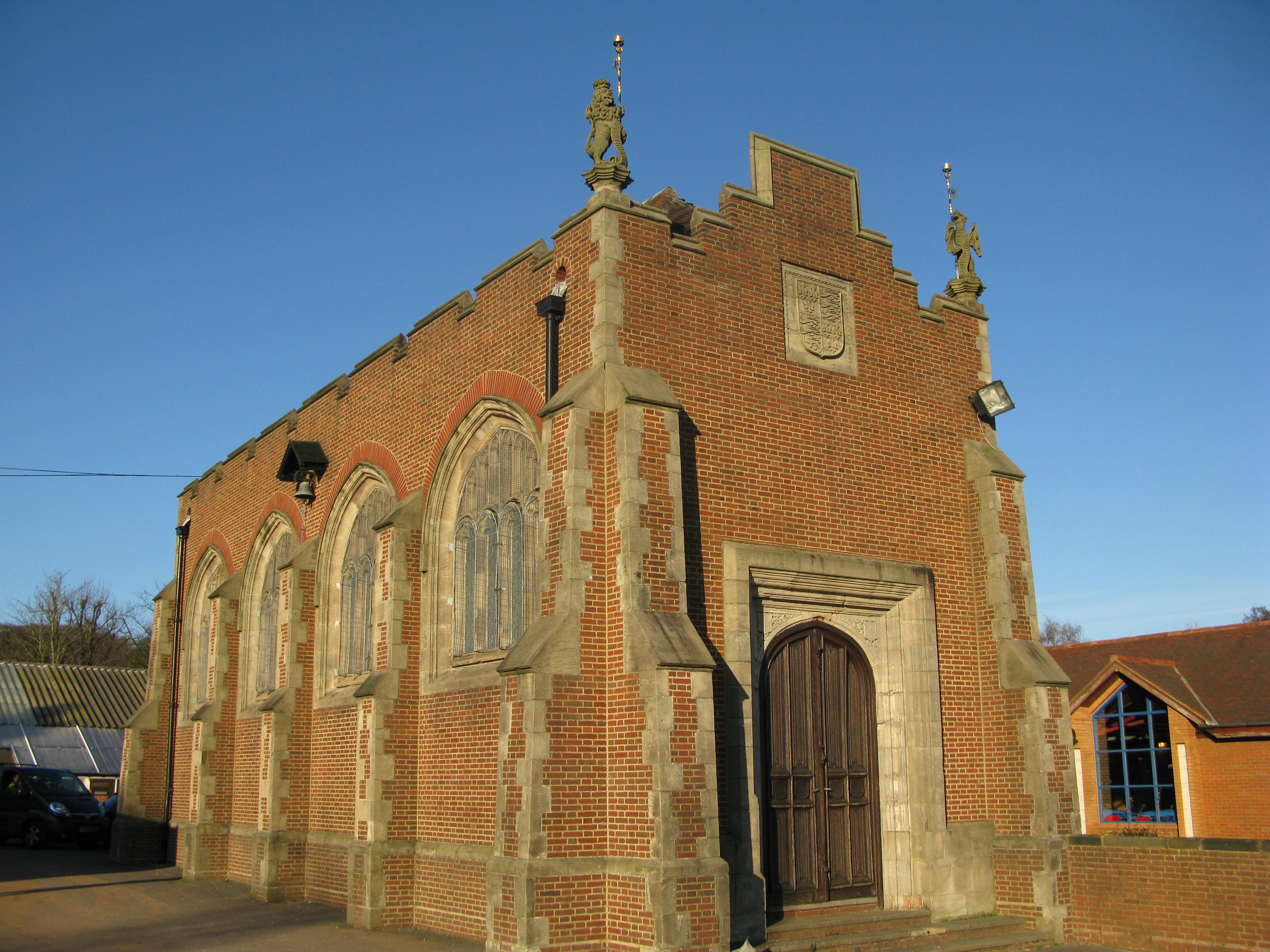
The chapel

The chapel, a Grade II* listed building, was originally part of the upper corridor of the 1838 New Street school (built by Charles Barry). It was moved brick by brick to Edgbaston (1938–1940) by Holland W. Hobbiss, and renovated and rebuilt in the 1950s.

The Cinema Museum in London holds extensive film of the old school being demolished in February 1936.

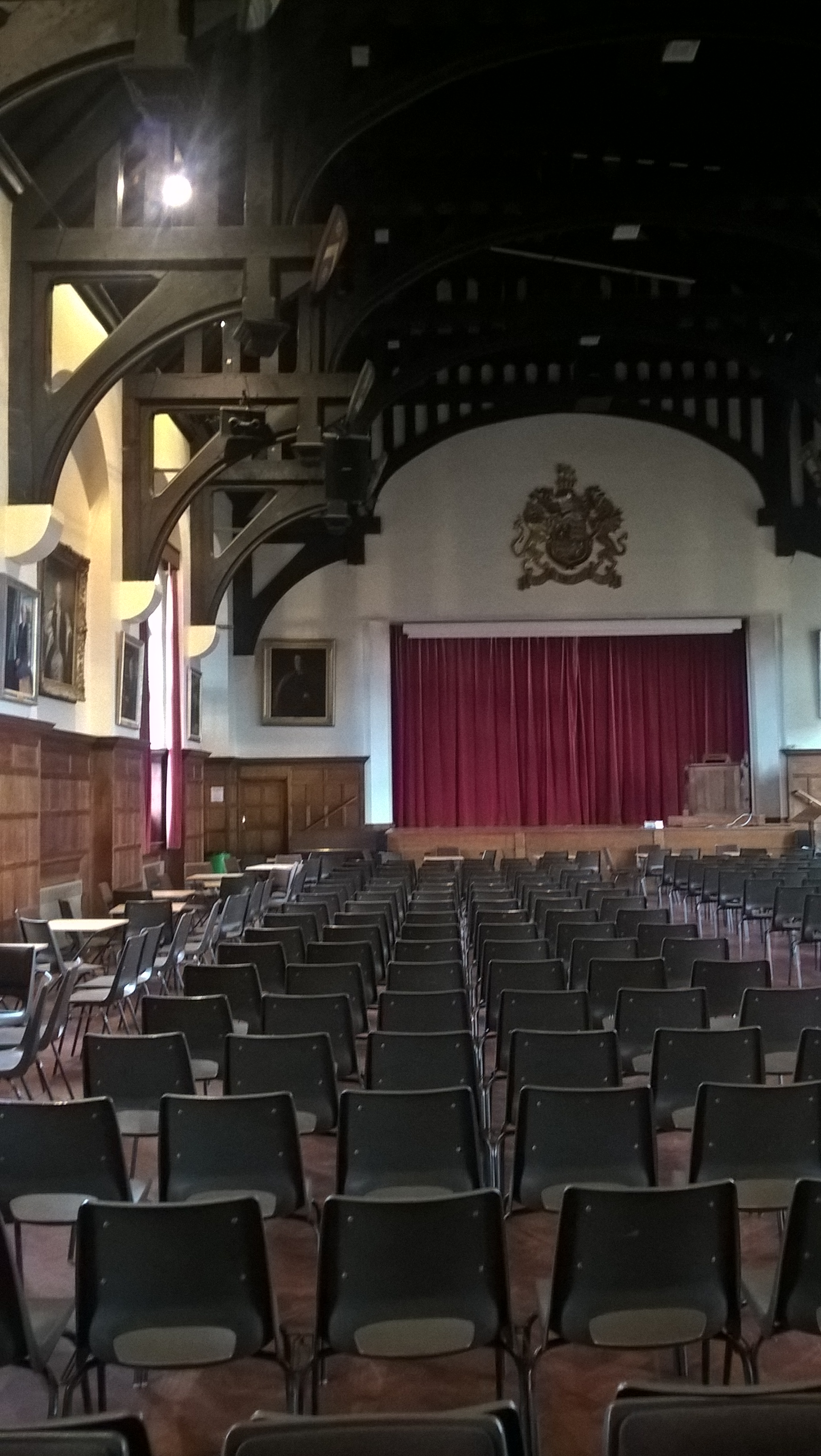
"Big School" the main assembly hall, used in the film Clockwise

=== Sapientia ===
The desk of the Chief Master, with "Sapientia" (wisdom) inscribed over it, survives from Barry's New Street school, and is still in daily use in Big School. This too is generally thought to be the work of Pugin.

== House system ==
House	Abbreviation	Colour	Master
Cary Gilson	CG	Light Blue	Robert Cary Gilson
Evans	E	Green	Charles Evans
Gifford	G	Purple	Edwin Hamilton Gifford
Heath	H	Yellow	Charles H. Heath
Jeune	J	Red	Francis Jeune
Levett	L	White	Rawdon Levett
Prince Lee	PL	Pink	James Prince Lee
Vardy	V	Dark Blue	Albert Vardy

King Edward's has a house system, instigated in 1902 by the then Headmaster, Robert Cary Gilson. Originally, there were four houses, using the colours Blue, Green, Red and Yellow, but the houses were known simply by the name of the Housemaster at any one time ("Mr Soandso's House"), involving a change of name whenever the Housemaster changed. In 1951 the number of Houses was enlarged to eight, and it was decided that they should have permanent names. Six were called after former Headmasters, and two after assistant masters (Rawdon Levett and C. H. Heath). The colours of each house are shown on this table, though that for Levett was formerly brown.

== Extracurricular activities ==
School visits are a priority at KES with two compulsory residentials in Shells (year 7) and a one more in each of year 8 (Removes) and year 9 (Upper Middles).

There are four main sports at KES; rugby and hockey in the winter and athletics and cricket in the summer. Other sports played at KES include Eton Fives, tennis and water polo. The water polo team has won the English Schools Under-19 Water Polo competition in 2002 and 2008, the latter win being accompanied by the Warwickshire Cup. Numerous players have been called to the City of Birmingham Youth Squad and English Schools Water Polo teams.

King Edward's School has had a Combined Cadet Force (CCF) since 1907 (originally Officers Training Corps, then Junior Training Corps, 1940–48); it is a voluntary organisation. The CCF comprises: the Royal Navy section, the Army section, and the Royal Air Force section. The RN section is currently affiliated to HMS Daring, along with several other organisations in the Midlands.

== School songs ==
There are two school songs:

- King Edward's School Song
  - Written by Alfred Hayes (1857–1936), an Old Edwardian; composed by A. Somervell and first sung by Jerome O'Neill in 1937.
  - A rousing song, sung mainly at the end of term. The boys usually place particular emphasis on the final words of the first line of the chorus by always shouting "SOME TO FAME!"
  - Much is made of the fact that the school song is sung in English, as opposed to the Latin of Eton and Rugby.
  - The song is composed of four verses, with the chorus sung after each one.
- The Quatercentenary Song
  - Written in Latin by Roger Dunt (1900–63), senior classics master; composed by Willis Grant (1907–81), music master
  - Sung at Founder's Day, the annual commemoration in October of King Edward's birthday, and at the school's Speech Day. It is also sung at various other award ceremonies. An extra verse was written for the visit of Queen Elizabeth II on 3 November 1955 (replacing a visit planned for the quatercentenary year 1952 by King George VI).

== King Edward's in modern literature ==
In the mid-20th century the school produced two authors who used their time at school as the basis for autobiographical work:

David Rudkin's TV film Penda's Fen alludes frequently to aspects of school life in the early 1950s. This includes dwelling on the Chief Master's rostrum "Sapientia" (see above) and the direct use of some personal surnames of staff and pupils from that period. Scenes involving the Combined Cadet Force, a central theme in the film, recreate the atmosphere of the school at that time. Rudkin (OE c.1947–1954) has published ambivalent views of his time at the school.

Jonathan Coe's novel The Rotters' Club was begun while he was at KES, and he said that the background detail of the school (renamed King William's) and the Birmingham suburbs came from his own life.

The biographical drama film Tolkien (2019) deals with the early life of J. R. R. Tolkien, including his time at KES.

== Notable former pupils ==
Former pupils of King Edward's School, Birmingham are known as Old Edwardians (OEs). A number of pupils have achieved prominence across various academic and sporting fields as well as in public service. Alumni of the school include two Nobel laureates, a Fields medallist, and J. R. R. Tolkien, author of The Lord of the Rings and The Hobbit.

In Science, Sir Maurice Wilkins was awarded the 1962 Nobel Prize for Physiology or Medicine. Most famous for discovering the structure of DNA, along with Watson and Crick, his research contributed to the scientific understanding of phosphorescence, isotope separation, optical microscopy and X-ray diffraction, and to the development of radar. Twenty years later, another pupil of the school, Sir John Vane shared the 1982 Nobel Prize for Medicine for "discoveries concerning prostaglandins and related biologically active substances". Similarly, Richard Borcherds was the winner of the Fields Medal (mathematical equivalent of the Nobel Prize). Finally, Harry Boot, physicist, was the co-developer of the cavity magnetron.

There have been a number of public service and military figures who were pupils at the school. Field Marshal William Slim, 1st Viscount Slim, was Commander of the successful Burma Campaign against the Japanese during the Second World War and later Chief of the Imperial General Staff (CIGS). Similarly, Lieutenant Colonel John Augustus Conolly, won the Victoria Cross (VC) at the Siege of Sevastopol in the Crimean War, becoming the only winner of the VC from the school. Sir Colin Figures, was Head of MI6 and played a distinguished role during the Falklands War. Another alumnus, Enoch Powell, remains an influential albeit controversial figure in British politics, serving in various Ministerial positions between 1957 and 1968, when he was sacked by Conservative Party leader Edward Heath for his "Rivers of Blood" speech. The first Mayor of the West Midlands, Andy Street CBE, also attended King Edward's.

In business, Sir Paul Ruddock, a hedge fund manager who served as chairman of the Victoria and Albert Museum, chairman of the University of Oxford Endowment, and co-founder and CEO of Lansdowne Partners, an alternative investment management firm, was an alumnus of the school. Similarly, James Quincey, the current chairman and CEO of the Coca-Cola Company, is also a former pupil of the school. Other alumni include Tony Hall, Baron Hall of Birkenhead, former Director General of the BBC, and Peter Williams, co-founder and CEO of Jack Wills.

Within the Arts, Sir Edward Burne-Jones, 1st Baronet was one of the most pre-eminent artists of the Pre-Raphaelite movement. James Dover Grant CBE (known by his pen name Lee Child), is a British author who writes thriller novels, and is best known for his Jack Reacher novel series. Jonathan Coe based his novel The Rotters' Club (2001) on his time at the school.

A number of sporting figures were pupils of the school including Alan Smith, England Test cricketer (England, Warwickshire and Oxford University), first CEO of the Test and County Cricket Board (TCCB).

== Head teachers ==
The head teacher was referred to as "Head Master" until 1952, when the newly appointed R. G. Lunt adopted the title "Chief Master", the title that has been used ever since. In 2024, on the retirement of Katy Ricks, the position of Chief Master was combined with that of Principal of King Edward VI High School for Girls, Kirsty von Malaisé (Principal of KEHS since 2020) taking over the joint role.

When the school was in New Street, an adjacent house was provided for the head master.

The following have served as Head or Chief Masters:

Head Masters

- 1561–1583 Thomas Buther
- 1583–1599 William Woodall
- 1599–1637 Richard Billingsley
- 1640–1645 John Barton
- 1645–1649 John Thompson
- 1654–1685 Nathaniel Brokesby
- 1685–1692 John Hickes
- 1693–1722 James Parkinson
- 1722–1726 John Hausted
- 1726–1746 Edward Mainwaring
- 1746–1759 John Wilkinson
- 1759–1763 Thomas Green
- 1770–1775 John Brailsford
- 1776–1797 Thomas Price
- 1797–1834 John Cooke (also rector of St Martin in the Bull Ring
- 1834–1838 Francis Jeune
- 1838–1848 James Prince Lee
- 1848–1862 Edwin Hamilton Gifford
- 1862–1872 Charles Evans
- 1872–1900 Albert Richard Vardy
- 1900–1929 Robert Cary Gilson
- 1929–1941 Edwin Thirlwall England
- 1942–1948 Charles Richard Morris
- 1948–1952 Thomas Edward Brodie Howarth

Chief Masters

- 1952–1974 Ronald Geoffrey Lunt
- 1974–1982 Francis George Robson Fisher
- 1982–1991 Martin John Wyndham Rogers
- 1991–1998 Hugh Wright
- 1998–2005 Roger Dancey
- 2006–2016 John Claughton
- 2016–2018 Mark Fenton
- 2018–2019 Keith Phillips
- 2019–2024 Katy Ricks

Chief Master & Principal

- 2024– Kirsty von Malaisé
