= William Cooper (Puritan) =

William Cooper (fl. 1653) was an English clergyman of Puritan views, chaplain to Elizabeth Stuart, Queen of Bohemia, participant in the Savoy Conference, and ejected minister.

== Life ==
He matriculated at Emmanuel College, Cambridge in 1628, graduating B.A, in 1632 and M.A. in 1635.

In 1640 he was appointed minister to the English church at Nijmegen. He married the daughter of the Dutch painter John Le Maire, who was in favour with William Laud, and so obtained the living of Ringmer in Sussex in 1641. Not in fact a Laudian, he showed himself a Puritan. From 1644 to 1648 he was chaplain to Elizabeth Stuart, Queen of Bohemia, and resided in her household at The Hague, where he replaced Sampson Johnson. This was a deal under which she would receive again an English pension, but was required to dismiss Johnson and take on Cooper, who had the approval of the Long Parliament. After her brother's execution in 1649 there was no further question of her accepting Parliament's nominee, and she appointed William Stamp around 1650, and then George Morley.

In 1653 he was appointed to examine candidates for the ministry. He was ejected from St Olave's Church in the parish of Southwark St Olave, in 1662, where he had worked in tandem with Ralph Venning, and in 1681 was confined in the crown office. He was alive in 1683.

== Works ==
He published several sermons, some of them edited by Samuel Annesley in his Morning Exercises at Cripplegate, and he wrote the annotations on the Book of Daniel in Matthew Poole's Commentary.
