= Jonathan Hanmer =

English clergyman and ejected minister

Jonathan Hanmer (1606–1687) was an English ejected minister.

== Life ==
A younger son of John Hanmer (alias Davie, died April 1628), and Siblye Downe his wife, he was born at Barnstaple in Devon, and baptised there on 3 October 1606. He attended Barnstaple grammar school, was admitted to Emmanuel College, Cambridge, in 1624, and graduated B.A. in 1627, and M.A. in 1631. He was ordained on 23 November 1632 by Theophilus Field; instituted to the living of Instow, Devon, the same year, he later held the vicarage of Bishops Tawton, from 1652.

From 1646 to 1662 Hanmer was lecturer in the church at Barnstaple. He gained a reputation as a preacher, but declined an invitation to preach before the archdeacon in 1635. In 1646, when Martin Blake, vicar of Barnstaple, was temporarily suspended, a petition was signed by the mayor and other residents of the town to the Devonshire committee of commissioners for the approbation of public preachers, requesting the appointment in Blake's absence of "Mr. Hughes or Mr. Hanmer." Blake's wife was Hanmer's cousin, and he took on some preaching duties in Barnstaple.

Hanmer was ejected from both vicarage and lectureship on the passing of the Act of Uniformity 1662; with Oliver Peard, he founded the first nonconformist congregation in Barnstaple, which before the building of a meeting-house in 1672, near the castle, met in a private malthouse or warehouse. After the Five Mile Act 1665, Hanmer ministered in London, Bristol, Pinner, and Torrington, as well as Barnstaple. He remained on good terms with the Church of England.

Hanmer died at Barnstaple on 18 December 1687, and was buried in the parish churchyard 21 December.

== Works ==
Hanmer published:

- Τελείωσις, or an Exercitation upon Confirmation, London, 1657, with imprimatur by Joseph Caryl, preceded by letters of recommendation by George Hughes, Richard Baxter, and Ralph Venning. Baxter approved of the book, and wrote his treatise Confirmation, the way to Reformation and Reconciliation in support of it; and Francis Fulwood of West Alvington wrote an appendix to his Discourse of the Visible Church, London, 1658, after reading the Exercitation. A second edition of Hanmer's book appeared in 1658, with an appendix.
- 'Άρχαιοσκοπία, or a View of Antiquity,' London, 1677, containing accounts of ten of the Church Fathers. It was apparently a reply to William Cave's Apostolici. The work has also been attributed to John Howe and James Howell; Abednego Seller in 1678 wrote some "Animadversions" on the book, in a work dedicated to Cave. Mary Wolffe in the Oxford Dictionary of National Biography says the author of the View of Antiquity is "almost certainly" Hanmer.

Hanmer drew up for his congregation in Barnstaple a confession of faith, and rules of conduct, mainly based on the articles of the Church of England. He supported the North American missionary John Eliot: correspondence survives, and they became close friends. Hanmer undertook fundraising work for Eliot, and channeled money directly to him, avoided the Massachusetts Corporation (New England Company).

== Family ==
Hanmer's wife Catharine died in May 1660. Besides his son John Hanmer (1642–1707), a nonconformist minister, they had at least six more children. Their daughter Katherine (8 August 1653 – 2 June 1694) married on 5 October 1673 William Gay (1649–1695), second son of John Gay of Frithelstock. They settled in Barnstaple, and John Gay the poet was their youngest child.

== Notes ==
Attribution

This article incorporates text from a publication now in the public domain: Stephen, Leslie; Lee, Sidney, eds. (1890). "Hanmer, Jonathan". Dictionary of National Biography. Vol. 24. London: Smith, Elder & Co.
