= Thomas Fairfax (Jesuit) =

Thomas Fairfax, D.D. (1656–1716), was an English Jesuit.

== Life ==
Fairfax was born in Yorkshire. He studied in the college of the Jesuits at St. Omer, entered the novitiate at Watten, 7 September 1675, and was ordained priest 18 December 1683. At one period he professed theology at Liège, and in 1685 he was minister at Ghent.

On the accession of James II of England, the provincial Father John Keynes asked the general of the Society to allow those most fit to take the degree of D.D; those who had professed theology at Liège took the degree at Trier, among them being Fairfax, under the assumed name of Beckett.

On 31 December 1687 James II sent a letter to Samuel Parker, bishop of Oxford, who had been made president of Magdalen College, Oxford, commanding him to admit Fairfax and other Catholics to fellowships. It is stated that Fairfax was appointed professor of philosophy in Magdalen College, and that he was well versed in the oriental languages. Fairfax was admitted Fellow on 9 January 1688, and two days later was made dean of arts of the college. After Parker's death Bonaventure Giffard, one of the four vicars apostolic, was on 31 March 1688, by a mandatory letter from the king, nominated president. At that time the majority of the fellows and demies were Catholics. The situation changed, however, with the Glorious Revolution. Fairfax was attacked in the streets of Oxford and narrowly escaped; and he was formally removed from his fellowship by the Visitor on 30 October 1688.

On 2 February 1693 he was professed of the four vows. In 1701 and 1704 he was procurator of the English province of the Society of Jesus, and resided in London. He was stationed at Wardour Castle, Wiltshire, in 1710, and he died on 2 March 1716.

== Works ==
His works are:

- ‘Some Reasons tendred to Impartial People, why Dr. Henry Maurice, Chaplain to his Grace of Canterbury, ought not to be traduc'd as a Licenser of a pamphlet entitled, a Plain Answer to a Popish Priest,’ &c. It was joined to ‘Twenty-one Questions further demonstrating the Schism of the Church of England,’ printed at the lodgings of Obadiah Walker, in University College, 1688. It was written in reply to the Rev. Abednego Seller's ‘Plain Answer to a Popish Priest, questioning the Orders of the Church of England,’ 1688. To a second edition of this pamphlet Seller annexed ‘An Answer to the Oxford Animadverter's Reflections,’ 1688.
- ‘The Secret Policy of the Jesuits, and the Present State of the Sorbonne, with a Short History of Jansenism in Holland’ (anon.); 2nd edit. 1702. The authorship is ascribed to Fairfax by Giffard.
- ‘A Case of Conscience proposed to, and decided by, Forty Doctors of the Faculty of Paris, in favour of Jansenism. … With some remarks upon it, proper to clear this whole matter’ (anon.), 1703.
