= Ralph Venning =

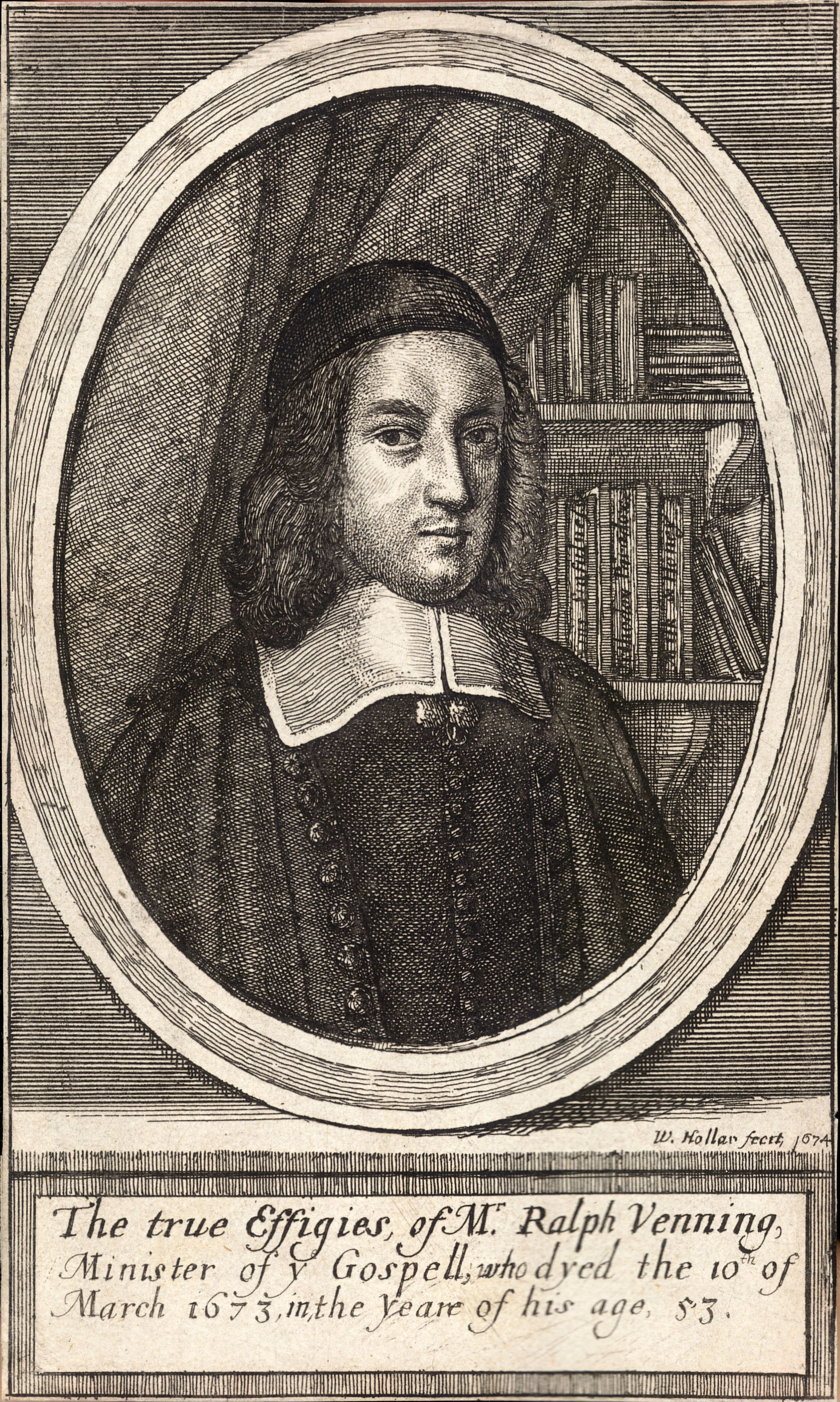
A 1674 engraving of Ralph Venning by Wenceslas Hollar

Ralph Venning (c. 1621 – 10 March 1673 or 1674) was an English nonconformist Christian.

== Life ==
The son of Francis and Joan Venning, he was born in Devon, perhaps at Kingsteignton, about 1621. He was the first convert of George Hughes, the puritan vicar of Tavistock. He was educated at Emmanuel College, Cambridge, where he was admitted as a sizar on 1 April 1643, graduated B.A. 1646, and proceeded M.A. 1650.

Venning held a lectureship at St Olave's Church in the parish of Southwark St Olave. He had a reputation as a preacher of charity sermons. He collaborated in Southwark with William Cooper; in 1654 he was pastor of a gathered church there.

Ejected by the Uniformity Act 1662, Venning became a colleague to Robert Bragge (1627–1704), pastor of an independent congregation at Pewterers' Hall, Lime Street, Fenchurch Street. He held this charge till his death.

He died on 10 March 1674, in his fifty-third year, and was buried in Bunhill Fields. An Elegy on his death was printed on a broadsheet in March 1674.

== Family ==
He married Hannah, widow of John Cope of London, and left a son, and a daughter Hannah (d. 7 June 1691).

== Legacy ==
Of his style, John Edwards remarked in The Preacher (1705, i. 203): "He turns sentences up and down, and delights in little cadences and chiming of words."

== Bibliography ==
He published, besides single sermons preached at St. Paul's Cathedral in 1654 and 1656:

- Orthodox Paradoxes, Or, A Believer Clearing Truth by Seeming Contradictions (1647; 7th ed. 1657)
- Mysteries and Revelations (1647; 5th ed. 1657)
- The New Command Renew'd, (1650; 4th ed. 1657)
- Milke and Honey, with a second part of Orthodox Paradoxes (1653; 3rd ed. 1656)
- Canaan's Flowings (1654) (a second part of Milke and Honey); 3rd ed. 1658
- Things worth thinking on (1665)
- The Beauty of Holiness (1665)
- Sin: The Plague of Plagues (published 1669) (Republished as "The Sinfulness of Sin" by Banner of Truth)
- The Puritans on Loving One Another
- The Sinfulness of Sin
- Warning to Backsliders
- Way to Happiness

Posthumous publications were:

- The Dead yet Speaking, or Mr. Venning's Living Sayings (1674), broadsheet
- Alarm to Unconverted Sinners (1675), broadsheet
- Venning's Remains, or Christ's School (1675). Preface by John Collins and James Baron.

He was one of the editors of the English Greek Lexicon (1661), the first lexicon of New Testament Greek giving the meanings in English). His farewell sermon at St. Olave's is in A Compleat Collection of Farewell Sermons, 1663; his 'divine sentences' are included in Saints' Memorials, 1674. He prefaced books by William Strong, Jonathan Hanmer, Theophilus Polwhele, and John Goodwin.
