= James Parkinson (controversialist) =

English writer and schoolmaster (1653–1722)

James Parkinson (1653–1722) was an English clergyman, college fellow, schoolmaster, and polemical writer.

== Early life ==
The son of James Parkinson, he was born at Witney, Oxfordshire, on 3 March 1653, and matriculated at Oxford on 2 April 1669 as a servitor of Brasenose College. He was admitted scholar of Corpus Christi College on 31 January 1671, but was expelled for abusing its President Robert Newlyn, in Lent 1674. Moving to Gloucester Hall, where he proceeded B.A. on 6 April 1674, and then to Hart Hall, he made a reputation by a speech at the Encænia, and was nominated fellow of Lincoln College by William Fuller the bishop of Lincoln, its visitor, in November 1674. He was admitted M.A. in November 1675, and took holy orders about the same time, though never holding any living.

== Expulsion from Oxford ==
Parkinson was a successful college tutor, by his own account, but his Whig views made him unpopular with colleagues: Thomas Hearne wrote that he was "a rank stinking whigg, who us'd to defend y^{e} Murther of King Charles 1st, and recommend Milton and such other Republican Rascalls to his Pupills". After Convocation, by decree of 21 July 1683, had condemned the tenets professed by the exclusion party, the fellows of Lincoln drew up a set of twelve articles against Parkinson, accusing him of advocating anti-monarchical and anti-Anglican principles, both in his private conversation, and from the pulpit of St. Michael's.

Thomas Marshall, then Rector of Lincoln College, declined to act in the matter; and the fellows then appealed to Timothy Halton, Provost of The Queen's College and pro-vice-chancellor. He summoned Parkinson and bound him to appear at the next assizes. Parkinson appeared in court on 3 September 1683, and pleading not guilty to an indictment charging him with holding republican views, was released on bail. The next day Halton informed him that, in accordance with orders "from above", he must expel him from the university.

The "bannitus" or proclamation of expulsion was posted on 6 September 1683. Parkinson appeared at several assizes and then before Chief-justice George Jeffreys in the Court of King's Bench, the proceedings against him continuing till April 1686.

== Later life ==
After spending some years in London Parkinson was readmitted to the university early in 1689 by Gilbert Ironside, vice-chancellor, but failed to regain his fellowship. He published a vindication of his own conduct anonymously, and took some part in the controversy with the nonjurors. His Whiggish pamphlets probably recommended him to Archbishop John Tillotson, who found Parkinson the headmastership of King Edward's School, Birmingham, in 1694.

Though Birmingham had already given its name to the extreme section of the Whig faction, Parkinson had a turbulent time there. His differences with the school governing body were such that in 1709 they unanimously resolved on his ejectment, alleging that the school under his direction had declined both in numbers and reputation. Costly proceedings in chancery had no result: Parkinson as headmaster maintained his position until his death; but no exhibitioners were sent to the universities, and the number of his pupils diminished. Rebuilding of the school started in 1701, and Parkinson was said by Hearne in his diary not to be a partisan as a teacher.

Parkinson died on 28 March 1722, and was buried in the middle chancel of St. Martin's Church, Birmingham, near the altar steps. A stone, with inscription, was placed on the grave by his son.

== Works ==
Among Parkinson's works were:

- An Account of Mr. Parkinson's Expulsion from the University of Oxford, in the Late Times. In Vindication of him from the False Aspersions cast on him in a late Pamphlet, Entituled "The History of Passive Obedience" (anon.), London, 1689. The History of Passive Obedience is attributed to Abednego Seller.
- The Fire's continued at Oxford; or, The Decree of the Convocation for Burning the "Naked Gospel" (by Arthur Bury) considered, In a letter to a Person of Honour (anon.), dated 30 August 1690.
- An Examination of Dr. Sherlock's Book, entituled "The Case of the Allegiance due to Sovereign Powers Stated and Resolved", London, 1691.
- A Dialogue between a Divine of the Church of England and a Captain of Horse, concerning Dr. Sherlock's late Pamphlet, intituled "The Case of Allegiance" 1691 [?].`
- A Loyal Oration composed by James Parkinson, Chief Master of the Free School of Birmingham, 1717

== Family ==
Parkinson left a widow, who died in 1742. His only son, James, was baptised at Birmingham on 4 September 1700, and educated in his father's school. He matriculated at Oxford from Wadham College on 6 June 1717, proceeded B.A. on 20 February 1721, was admitted M.A. on 11 May 1724, was elected sub-dean, and died on 28 December 1724, being buried near his father.

== Notes ==
Attribution

This article incorporates text from a publication now in the public domain: Lee, Sidney, ed. (1895). "Parkinson, James (1653-1722)". Dictionary of National Biography. Vol. 43. London: Smith, Elder & Co.
