= Abednego Seller =

English divine and writer (died 1705)

Abednego Seller (c. 1646–1705) was an English non-juring divine and controversial writer.

== Life ==
Seller was born to Richard Seller in Plymouth in around 1646, and matriculated at Lincoln College, Oxford as a servitor, on 26 April 1662. He left Oxford without a degree, and took a job, On 11 March 1665 he was ordained deacon by Seth Ward at Exeter; but did not proceed to the priesthood until 22 December 1672, when he was ordained by Bishop Anthony Sparrow in Exeter Cathedral.

Seller was instituted to the rectory of Combe-in-Teignhead, near Teignmouth, Devonshire, on 29 March 1682, and vacated it on 8 September 1686 when he became vicar of Charles Church, Plymouth. Refusing the oaths to William III and Mary II, the new sovereigns, he was deprived of the vicarage, and his successor was admitted to it on 2 September 1690.

Seller moved to London and settled in Red Lion Square. He had a valuable library, but on 17 January 1700 it was destroyed by fire.

He died in London in 1705.

== Legacy ==
Seller left books, manuscripts, and coins. To the Bodleian Library, he gave a manuscript of the end of the 15th century, containing William of Malmesbury's De Gestis Pontificum and the Chronicon Lichfeldense. To Lincoln College he gave works by Byzantine historians. The rest of his books were to be sold for the benefit of his grandchildren. A copy of the Thesaurus of Bonaventure Vulcanius (1600) later went to the British Museum.

His papers are held at Cambridge University.

== Works ==
Seller was the author of:

- An Infallible Way to Contentment in the midst of Publick or Personal Calamities (anon.), 1679 and 1688. It was translated into Welsh about 1790, and reprinted in 1803 and 1822, with a preface (1822) by Thomas Tregenna Biddulph. In 1883, it was reproduced by the Religious Tract Society as the third of its "Companions for a Quiet Hour". It shows the influence of the Whole Duty of Man (Academy, 12 Jan. 1884, p. 24).
- Remarques relating to the state of the Church of the First Centuries; with Animadversions on J. H.'s “View of Antiquity” (anon.), 1680, dedicated to William Cave, against Jonathan Hanmer of Barnstaple.
- The Devout Communicant assisted with Rules, together with Meditations, Prayers, and Anthems for Every Day of the Holy Week, 1686; 6th edit. 1695. Revised and enlarged, republished in 1704 as The Good Man's Preparation for the Receiving of the Blessed Sacrament, and then dedicated to Sir William Boothby.
- Remarks upon the Reflections of the Author of Popery Misrepresented on his answerer, particularly as to the Deposing Doctrine (anon.), 1686; commentary on the controversy between John Goter and Edward Stillingfleet.
- A Plain Answer to a Popish Priest questioning the Orders of the Church of England (anon.), 1688. It was answered by Thomas Fairfax, a Jesuit, to whom Seller in 1689 replied in a second edition "with an answer to the Oxford Animadverter's Reflections".
- History of Passive Obedience since the Reformation (anon.), 1689.
- Continuation of the History of Passive Obedience (anon.), 1690; in some copies an appendix of 56 pages is added. It was written to show that the oath of allegiance to William and Mary should not be taken, and was answered by Stillingfleet, Samuel Johnson, James Parkinson and others.
- Considerations upon the Second Canon in the book entitled Constitutions and Canons Ecclesiastical (anon.), 1693.
- Form of Prayer and Humiliation for God's Blessing upon his Majesty and his Dominions (anon.), 1690.
- An Exposition of the Church Catechism from our Modern Authors and the Holy Scriptures (anon.), 1695.
- The Antiquities of Palmyra, with an appendix on the names, religion, and government; and a commentary on the inscriptions lately found there, 1696; 2nd edit. 1705.

Seller assisted William Cave in his Historia Literaria (1688). He probably also wrote A Letter to the Author of a late paper entituled “A Vindication of the Divines of the Church of England” in defence of the “History of Passive Obedience” (anon.), 1689.

== Family ==
Seller married Marie Persons at Abbotsham, near Bideford, on 2 December 1668.

== Notes ==
Attribution

This article incorporates text from a publication now in the public domain: Lee, Sidney, ed. (1897). "Seller, Abednego". Dictionary of National Biography. Vol. 51. London: Smith, Elder & Co.
