= Peter Williams (businessman) =

British businessman (born 1974)

- Born: Peter Richard Michael Williams; June 1974 (age 52)
- Education: King Edward's School, Birmingham
- Alma mater: University College London
- Known for: co-founder and 52% owner, Jack Wills
- Title: CEO, Jack Wills
- Spouse: Laura Jane Williams

Peter Richard Michael Williams (born June 1974) is a British businessman, the co-founder, former co-owner and ex-CEO of the clothing brand Jack Wills.

== Early life ==
Peter Williams was born in June 1974. He was educated at King Edward's School, Birmingham, where he was school captain, followed by a bachelor's degree in economics from University College London.

== Career ==
Peter Williams and Robert Shaw founded Jack Wills in 1999. Williams was 23 when the first store opened at 22 Fore Street, Salcombe and it was created with £40,000 – the founders slept above the shop. The brand was named after his grandfather, Jack Williams.

In 2012, Williams debuted on the Sunday Times Rich List, with an estimated worth of £200 million ($326 million).

In October 2016, Williams and private equity firm BlueGem became the joint owners, after long-standing investor Inflexion sold out after nine years. Williams owned 52% of the company, but ceased to have any role in the business following its collapse in 2019, which led to a buyout of the brand by Sport Direct (now Frasers Group).

== Personal life ==
Williams has known his wife, Laura Jane Williams, since he was 12 years old.
