= Peter Vinke =

English divine

Peter Vinke (died 6 September 1702), was an English divine.

Vinke matriculated from Corpus Christi College, Cambridge, 1641, proceeded B.A. 1643–1644, received his M.A. from Pembroke College, Cambridge in 1647, and received his B.D. in 1654. He was elected a fellow at Pembroke College in 1645. He was admitted to Leiden University in 1648. But he appears to have remained in London, being ordained on 29 November 1649. Later he became rector of St Michael's, Cornhill, London, and then perpetual curate of St Catharine Creechurch, London, from 1661 until 24 August 1662. Vinke was ejected in 1662 after which he continued to minister to a ″considerable audience″ in his own house. John Howe preached his funeral sermon.

Vinke was well known for his sermons. On 3 October 1658 he preached a sermon at St. Paul's, London, later published under the title Tēs pisteōs ’elegchos: or The reason of faith, by order of the Lord Mayor of London, who was in attendance. Four of his sermons were published in the Morning Exercises at Cripplegate. He contributed the commentary on Acts to Matthew Poole's Annotations.

== Works ==
- ΤΗΣ ΠΙΣΤΕΩΣ ἜΛΕΓΧΟΣ: or The Reason of Faith: Briefly discuss’d in a Sermon, Preach’d at Pauls before the Right Honourable, the Lord Mayor, &c. The third of October, 1658. And publish’d by the Order of his Lordship, and Court of Aldermen. By Peter Vinke B.D. Sometimes fellow of Pembroke-Hall in Cambridge: and now Minister of M. Corn-hill, London. (London: E[dward]. M[ottershed]. for Ralph Smith, 1659) ESTC
- ″Quest. How may we best know the worth of the Soul?″ In A continuation of morning-exercise questions and cases of conscience, practically resolved by sundry ministers, in October, 1682 (London: J.A. for John Dunton, 1683), pp. 913-935. Google Books
- ″How is Gospel-grace the best motive to holiness?″ In Morning exercises at Cripplegate, St. Giles in the fields, and in Southwark, 5th ed., 6 vols. (London: Thomas Tegg, 1844-1845), vol. 4, pp. 264-284. Google Books
- ″Of original sin inhering.″ In Morning exercises at Cripplegate, St. Giles in the fields, and in Southwark, 5th ed., 6 vols. (London: Thomas Tegg, 1844), vol. 5, pp. 115-134.
- ″Protestants separated for Christ's name's sake.″ In Morning exercises at Cripplegate, St. Giles in the fields, and in Southwark, 5th ed., 6 vols. (London: Thomas Tegg, 1844-1845), vol. 6, pp. 26-51. Google Books
- "The Acts of the Apostles." In Matthew Poole, Annotations Upon the Holy Bible Wherein the Sacred Text is Inserted, and Various Readings Annex'd, 4th ed. (London: Thomas Parkhurst et al., 1700), vol. 2. Google Books
