= Jack Wills =

British clothing brand

Jack Wills Retail Limited
- Trade name: Jack Wills
- Type: Private
- Industry: Retail
- Genre: Fashion store
- Founded: 1999; 27 years ago (Salcombe, Devon)
- Founder: Peter Williams
- Headquarters: London, England
- Number of locations: 24 (2024)
- Area served: United Kingdom; Ireland; United States; Singapore; Hong Kong; Macau; Kuwait; United Arab Emirates; Lebanon
- Products: Men's fashion, Women's fashion, Accessories, Homeware
- Revenue: ▼£19.1 million (2024)
- Number of employees: 135 (2025)
- Parent: Frasers Group
- Website: www.jackwills.com

Jack Wills Retail Limited, trading as Jack Wills, is a British clothing brand founded by Peter Williams and Robert Shaw in Salcombe, Devon, in 1999. Originally positioned as a 'university outfitter' targeting affluent British university students with a preppy, heritage-inspired aesthetic (often described as “Fabulously British”), the brand rapidly expanded in the 2000s and 2010s, becoming closely associated with the “Sloane Ranger” and “posh” subcultures. Known for its pheasant logo, pastel colours, hoodies, gilets, and seasonal “handbook” catalogues featuring young models in country-house settings, Jack Wills opened over 70 stores in the UK, Ireland, the US, Middle East, and Asia at its peak.

After entering administration in August 2019, the brand and its intellectual property were acquired by Frasers Group (then Sports Direct) for £12.8 million. Since 2020 it has operated primarily as an online-only retailer with a much-reduced physical presence (a handful of UK outlet stores and concessions in Frasers Group stores). As of 2025, Jack Wills continues to trade online and through wholesale partners, positioning itself as premium British heritage casual wear.

== History ==
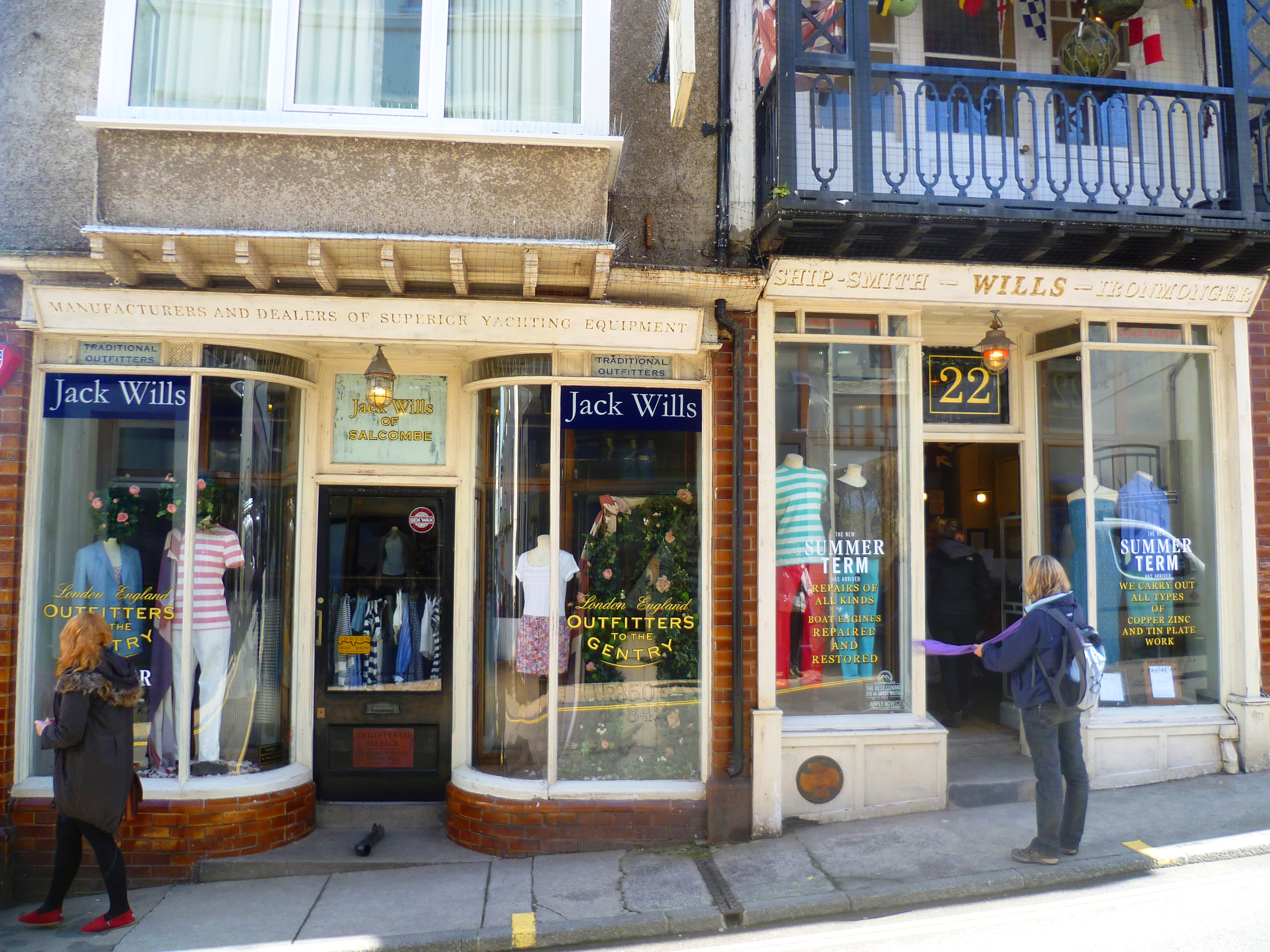
Original Jack Wills branch in Salcombe, Devon

Peter Williams and Robert Shaw founded the brand in 1999. Williams was 23 when the first store opened at 22 Fore Street, Salcombe, and it was created with £40,000 – the founders slept above the shop. The brand was named after one of the co-founders' grandparents.

In an interview with the Financial Times, Williams said: "When I started thinking about a premium brand I dredged up this vision of what I remembered in Salcombe. I thought, 'What if I could create a brand that could bottle what being at a British university was all about and all the cool amazing stuff that goes with that?' It's such a uniquely cherished part of your life. I thought if you could create a brand that epitomised that it would be very compelling."

The brand was a success, with a second store being opened in Fulham, London, in October the same year. The store was ram-raided and was closed down, but a further store was opened in Aldeburgh, Suffolk. As the business grew, Jack Wills stores were opened in places with universities or private schools, such as Eton, Oxford, Winchester and St Andrews.

Originally, it was heavily marketed towards university students, using the slogan and trademark "University Outfitters" to reflect the inspiration behind the brand.

In 2007 the brand was partly owned by Jack Wills Ltd, a private limited company registered in the UK, while a 27% stake was held by the private equity firm Inflexion after an investment deal. In 2011, the company was valued at £140 million, of which co-founders Williams and Shaw held a 52% stake and 21% stake, respectively.

In 2012 Williams debuted on the Sunday Times Rich List, coming in at number 370, with an estimated worth of £200 million ($326 million). In May 2013, Williams announced he was stepping aside as CEO to become a non-executive director. Former chief marketing officer of Vodafone, Wendy Becker, was appointed as CEO soon afterwards.

In February 2014, it was announced that fashion designer Richard Nicoll was to become the new creative director of Jack Wills, to come into effect Spring 2015. As of 2015, Williams was reinstated as working CEO on the board after the departure of Becker. Richard Nicoll also parted ways with the company amicably in autumn 2015.

In October 2016, Williams and private equity firm BlueGem became the joint owners, after long-standing investor Inflexion left after nine years.

Jack Wills collapsed into administration with debts of £100 million in August 2019. Sports Direct acquired the business for a sum in the region of £12.8 million, significantly less than its 2011 value.

== Stores ==
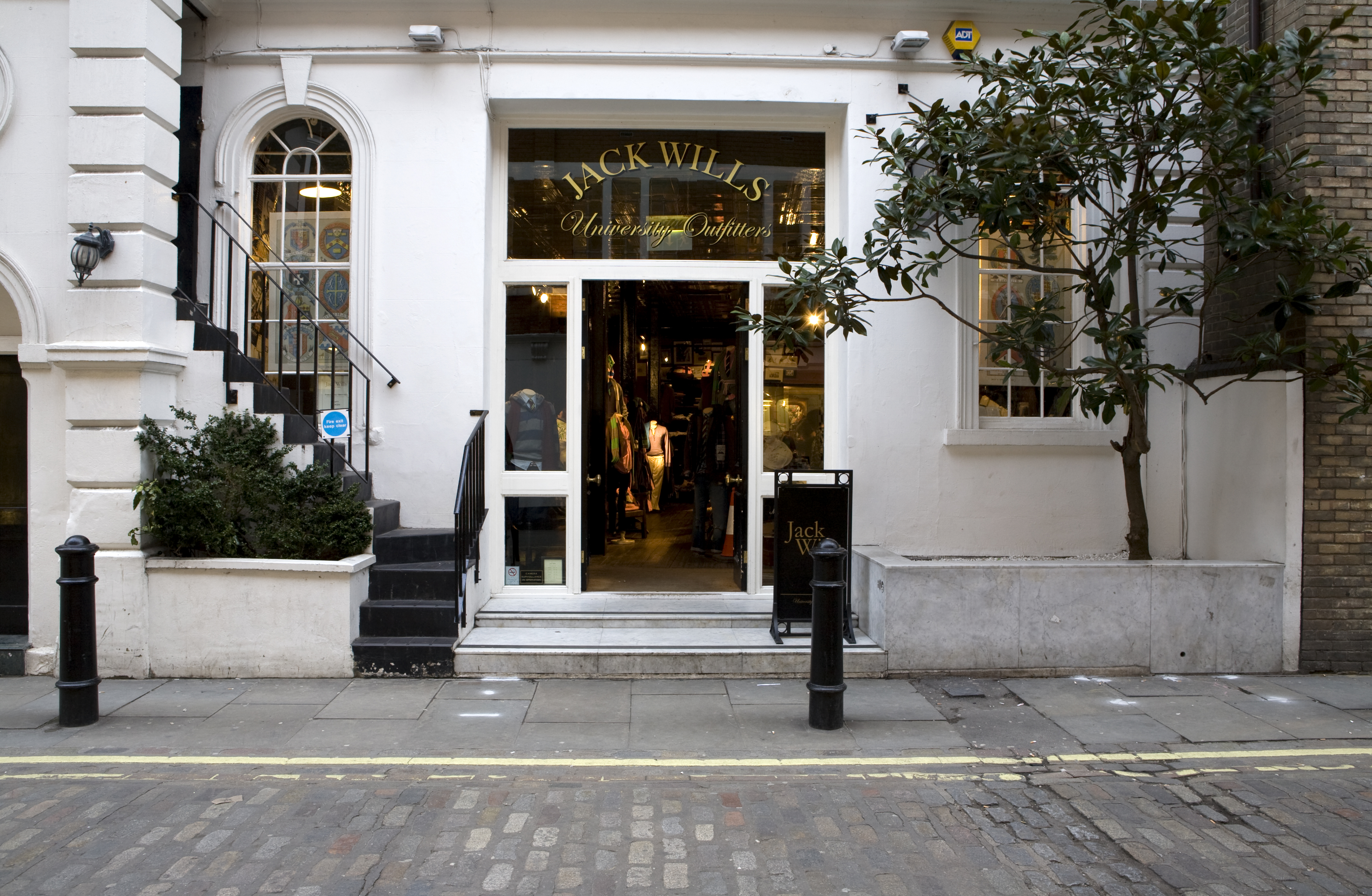
Jack Wills storefront

Since the first store opened in Salcombe, Jack Wills stores have opened across the United Kingdom and internationally. At its peak, there were - as of September 2016 - approximately 70 stores in the UK, including eight in London, four in Scotland (Edinburgh, St Andrews, Aberdeen and Glasgow), two in Wales (Abersoch and Cardiff), two in the Channel Islands (St Peter Port and St Helier), and one in Northern Ireland (Belfast). There were also eight outlet stores across the UK; Gunwharf Quays in Portsmouth, Banbridge in Northern Ireland, Bicester, Halifax, Cheshire Oaks, Street, Somerset, Swindon and Wembley in London. In the Republic of Ireland there was also a Jack Wills outlet store in the Kildare Outlet Village, close to Dublin, even though sales of the brand continue to drop in Ireland.

The most recent store to open in the UK is in Marlborough, Wiltshire.

In December 2011, Jack Wills opened in Hong Kong with the launch of two stores, in Leighton Centre at Causeway Bay and in Harbour City mall at Kowloon. In November 2014, Jack Wills launched its first store in Singapore at Raffles City Shopping Centre with an opening party.

By 2023, the website listed 31 Jack Wills stores across the United Kingdom (including 1 in Scotland, 1 in Wales and 2 in Northern Ireland). 11 of these were branded as Jack Wills Outlet stores.

On 11th November 2024, the original and flagship shop failed to open following a closing down sale, and the shop has been stripped. So it seems that this is the end of the 'Salcombe' and '22 Fore Street' branding for Jack Wills.

== Products ==
Jack Wills' products are branded with the signature logo of a pheasant with a top hat and walking stick. The company formerly published "Handbooks", which were released four times a year for each new season. The handbook was a signature print catalogue for the brand, showcasing the campaign shoots alongside editorial work and products available for the new season. Jack Wills clothing ranges from traditional British formal wear and tailoring, such as shirts, tweed jackets and blazers, to more contemporary casual clothing: hooded tops, sweatpants, t-shirts and polo shirts.

== Marketing ==
The brand's ranges are given a ‘private school’ and ‘preppy’ branding, as the Jack Wills pricing strategy means the clothes may not be considered affordable to everyone. Jack Wills feature sports-oriented, collegiate branding, for example apparel relating to polo, rugby, and also rowing, such as the J.W.R.C (Jack Wills Rowing Club). Jack Wills' "University Outfitters" title reflects its target market: university students. However, the label is popular in both Secondary schools and colleges. The brand does not use a conventional advertising model, instead relying on word of mouth viral marketing. This is often stimulated by the events they hold such as the Jack Wills Varsity Polo, JW Unsigned and JW Seasonnaires. In April 2011, the ASA upheld complaints about the Jack Wills 2011 Spring Term handbook. The handbook contained some controversial images of young adults in a state of undress. In their ruling, the ASA said that "we concluded that the catalogue was sufficiently provocative as to present a risk to younger teenagers."

== Aubin and Wills ==
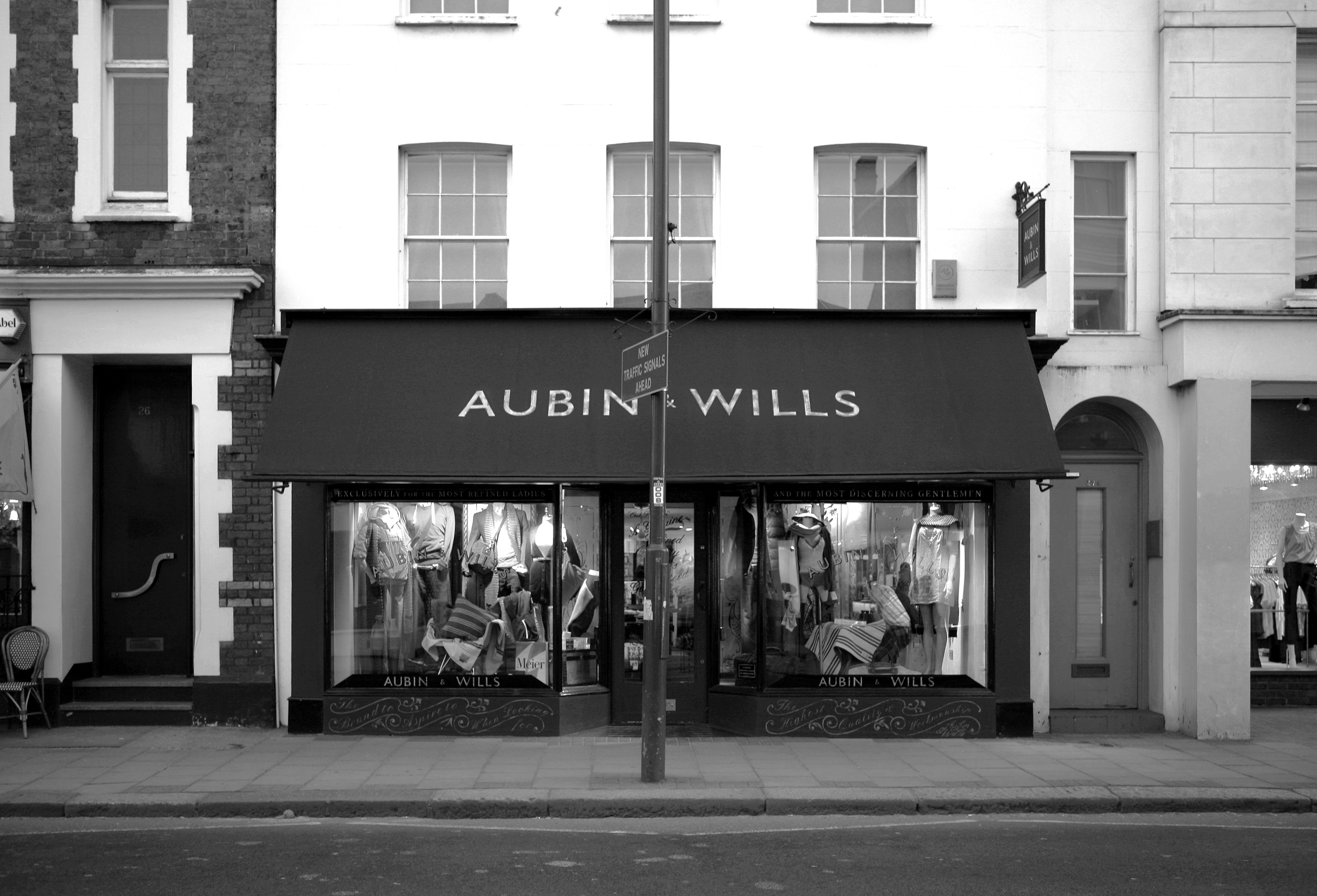
Branch in Wimbledon

Aubin & Wills was launched by Jack Wills in September 2008 as a sister brand, aimed at customers, aged 25 and up. Its slogan was "Modern British design inspired by the past living in the present". In November 2012, Jack Wills announced the decision to terminate the Aubin & Wills brand to concentrate on the global growth of the principal brand, with all trading ceasing by January 2013.

=== The Aubin Gallery and Cinema ===
On 20 May 2010, the Aubin Gallery was launched, situated on the top floor of the Shoreditch store curated by British artist Stuart Semple. The gallery's primary focus has been to provide a platform for a new international artists and curators. Since 2010 the program has showcased the works of Tom Ormond, Piers Secunda, The Girls, Alana Lake, Alex Bunn, Sarah Maple, Adham Faramawy, James Howard, NERO and Yasam Sasmazer, among others. The 7,500 sq ft (700 m^{2}) concept space also includes The Aubin Cinema which is run in collaboration with the members' club Shoreditch House.
