= James Nalton =

James Nalton (1600?–1662) was an English Presbyterian minister, known as "the weeping prophet".

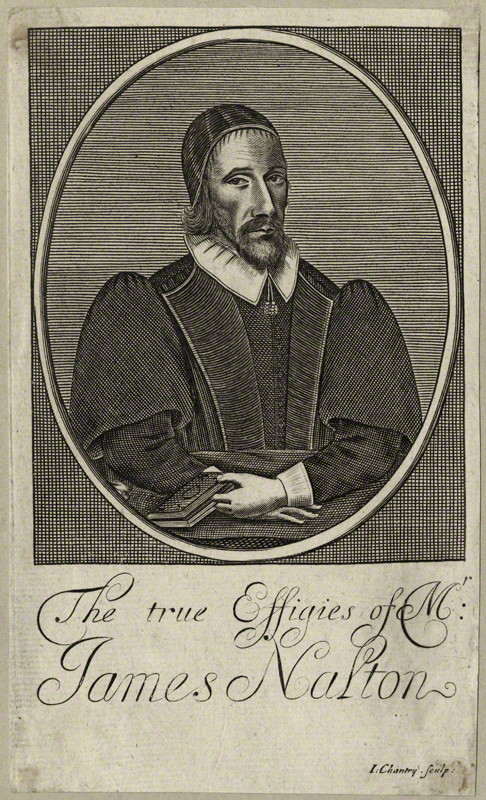
James Nalton, 1677 engraving

== Life ==
Nalton was born about 1600, possibly in Walkington, Yorkshire, where his father Francis was rector, and is mentioned in his father's will dated 1617. The Visitation of Yorkshire shows he had three younger brothers: Nathaniel, Robert and George. He was educated at Trinity College, Cambridge, where he graduated B.A. in 1619, and M.A. in 1623. According to Baxter, he acted for a time as assistant to a certain Richard Conder, either in or near London;and in 1632 he obtained the living of Rugby, Warwickshire.

In 1642 Nalton signed a petition addressed to Lord Dunsmore respecting the appointment of a master to Rugby grammar school. It was rejected, and apparently caused him to leave Rugby. He subsequently acted as chaplain to Colonel Grantham's regiment; and then about 1644 he was appointed incumbent of St Leonard, Foster Lane, London. There he remained, with a short interval, until his death. On 29 April 1646 he preached before the House of Commons at St Margaret's, Westminster, on The Delay of Reformation provoking God's further Indignation (London, 1646), his fellow preacher on this occasion being John Owen. He was called the "weeping prophet" because "his seriousness often expressed itself by tears".

In 1651 Nalton was indirectly concerned in Christopher Love's plot, and had to take refuge in Holland. For a short period one of the ministers of the English Church at Rotterdam; but he returned to England by permission at the end of six months, and resumed his work at St Leonard's until he was ejected in 1662. He died in December of that year, and was buried on 1 January 1663. His funeral sermon, entitled Rich Treasure in Earthen Vessels, was preached by Thomas Horton.

== Works ==
Nalton was the first signatory of the preface to Jeremiah Burroughes's Saint's Treasury, 1654. He also published separate sermons. Twenty of these, with a eulogistic preface and a portrait engraved by John Chantrey, were issued by Matthew Poole, London, 1677.

== Notes ==
Attribution

This article incorporates text from a publication now in the public domain: Lee, Sidney, ed. (1894). "Nalton, James". Dictionary of National Biography. Vol. 40. London: Smith, Elder & Co.
