= Matthew Poole =

English theologian and biblical commentator (1624–1679)

Matthew Poole, 1680 engraving by Robert White

Matthew Poole (1624–1679) was an English Nonconformist theologian and biblical commentator.

== Life to 1662 ==
He was born at York, the son of Francis Pole, but he spelled his name Poole, and in Latin Polus; his mother was a daughter of Alderman Toppins there. He was educated at Emmanuel College, Cambridge, from 1645, under John Worthington. Having graduated B.A. at the beginning of 1649, he succeeded Anthony Tuckney, in the sequestered rectory of St Michael le Querne, then in the fifth classis of the London province, under the parliamentary system of presbyterianism. This was his only preferment. He proceeded M.A. in 1652. On 14 July 1657 he was one of eleven Cambridge graduates incorporated M.A. at Oxford on occasion of the visit of Richard Cromwell as chancellor.

Poole was a jure divino presbyterian, and an authorised defender of the views on ordination of the London provincial assembly, as formulated by William Blackmore. After the Restoration of the English monarchy, in a sermon of 26 August 1660 before the lord mayor Sir Thomas Aleyn at St Paul's Cathedral, he made a case for simplicity in public worship. On the passing of the Uniformity Act 1662 he resigned his living, and was succeeded by R. Booker on 29 August 1662.

== Later life ==
Though he occasionally preached and printed some tracts, Poole made no attempt to gather a congregation. He had a patrimony of £100 a year, on which he lived.

He was one of those who presented to the king "a cautious and moderate thanksgiving" for the indulgence of 15 March 1672, and were offered royal bounty. Gilbert Burnet reports, on Edward Stillingfleet's authority, that Poole received for two years a pension of £50. Early in 1675 he entered with Richard Baxter into a negotiation for comprehension, promoted by John Tillotson, which came to nothing. According to Henry Sampson, Poole made provision for a nonconformist ministry and day-school at Tunbridge Wells, Kent.

In his depositions relative to the alleged Popish Plot (September 1678), Titus Oates had represented Poole as marked for assassination because of his tract (1666) on the Nullity of the Romish Faith. Poole gave some credit to this, reportedly after a scare on returning home one evening near Clerkenwell with Josiah Chorley. Poole left England and settled at Amsterdam. Here he died on 12 October 1679 (N.S.), and was buried in a vault of the English Reformed Church, Amsterdam. His wife was buried on 11 August 1668 at St Andrew Holborn, Stillingfleet preaching the funeral sermon. He left a son, who died in 1697.

== Works ==
In 1654 Poole published a tract against John Biddle. In 1658 he put forward a scheme for a scholarship for university courses, for those intending to enter the ministry. The plan was approved by Worthington and Tuckney, and had the support also of John Arrowsmith, Ralph Cudworth, William Dillingham, and Benjamin Whichcote. Money was raised, and supported William Sherlock at Peterhouse. His Vox Clamantis gives his view of the ecclesiastical situation after 1662.

The work with which his name is principally associated is the Synopsis criticorum biblicorum (5 vols fol., 1669-1676), in which he summarizes the views of one hundred and fifty biblical critics. On the suggestion of William Lloyd, Poole undertook the Synopsis as a digest of biblical commentators, from 1666. It took ten years, with relaxation often at Henry Ashurst's house. The prospectus of Poole's work mustered of eight bishops and five continental scholars. A patent for the work was obtained on 14 October 1667, and the first volume was ready for the press, when difficulties were raised by Cornelius Bee, publisher of the Critici Sacri (1660); the matter was decided in Poole's favour. Rabbinical sources and Roman Catholic commentators are included; little is taken from John Calvin, nothing from Martin Luther. The book was written in Latin and is currently being translated into English by the Matthew Poole Project.

Poole also wrote English Annotations on the Holy Bible, completing the chapters as far as Isaiah 58 before his death in 1679. The rest of the Annotations were completed by friends and colleagues among his Nonconformist brethren. The first printing of the completed edition was in 1685 [1683?], 2 volumes folio, followed by editions in 1688, 1696 (with valuable chapter outlines added by the editors, Samuel Clark and Edward Veale), and the 4th and definitive edition in 1700, the basis of all others. The other authors, by Biblical book, were:

- Isaiah 59-60 – John Jackson
- Isaiah 61-66, Jeremiah, Lamentations, Gospels, 1 and 2 Corinthians, Galatians, 1 and 2 Timothy, Titus, Philemon, Revelation – Dr. John Collinges
- Ezekiel, Minor Prophets – Henry Hurst
- Daniel – William Cooper
- Acts – Peter Vinke
- Romans – Richard Mayo
- Ephesians, James, 1 and 2 Peter – Edward Veale
- 1 and 2 Thessalonians – Matthew Barker
- Philippians, Colossians – Richard Adams
- Hebrews – Obadiah Hughes
- 1, 2 and 3 John – John Howe

=== Selected works ===
- Poole, Matthew (1843). Dialogue between a Popish priest and an English Protestant: wherein the principal points and arguments of both religions are truly proposed, and fully examined. Philadelphia: Presbyterian Board of Publication. pp. 206. OL 7055800M. LCC BX1763 P66 1843.
- Poole, Matthew [originally 1673]; Harley, Thomas, [editor, 2009] A Seasonable Apology for the Christian Religion. Bloomington: iUniverse. ISBN 9781440134845
- Poole, M., Commentary, published online by Bible Hub (the Online Parallel Bible Project).

== Attribution ==
This article incorporates text from a publication now in the public domain: "Poole, Matthew". Dictionary of National Biography. London: Smith, Elder & Co. 1885–1900.
